= Dionysian Mysteries =

Ritual of ancient Greece and Rome

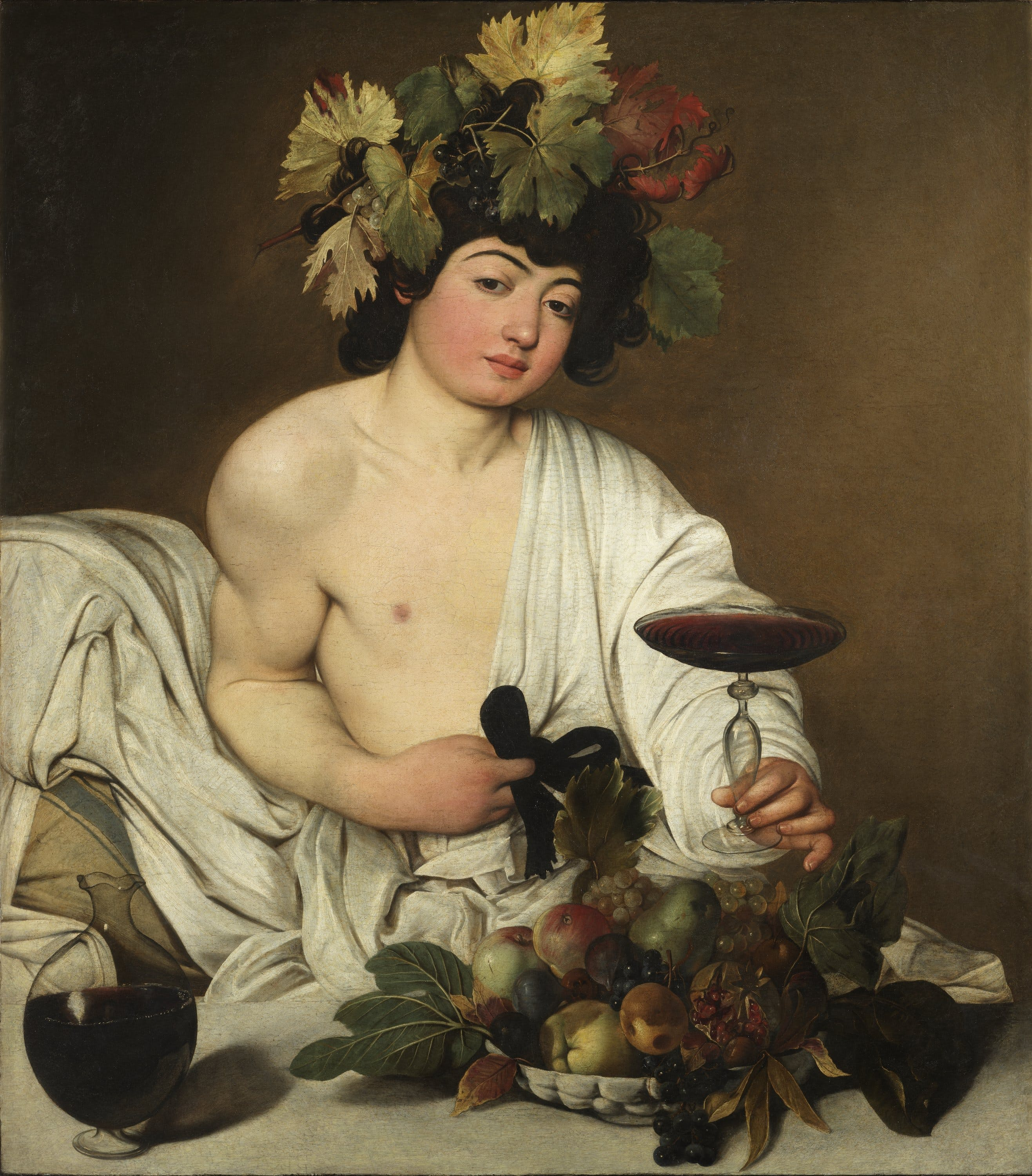
Dionysus in Bacchus by Caravaggio

The Dionysian Mysteries were a ritual of ancient Greece and Rome which sometimes used psychoactive substances and other trance-inducing techniques (like dance and music) to remove inhibitions. It also provided some liberation for people marginalized by Greek society, such as slaves, outlaws, and non-citizens. In their final phase the Mysteries shifted their emphasis from a chthonic, underworld orientation to a transcendental, mystical one, with Dionysus changing his nature accordingly. By its nature as a mystery religion reserved for the initiated, many aspects of the Dionysian cult remain unknown and were lost with the decline of Greco-Roman polytheism. Modern knowledge is derived from descriptions, imagery, and cross-cultural studies. Archaeological remains such as the Bacchic gold tablets are a significant source to reconstruct initiation practices into the mysteries.

== Origins ==
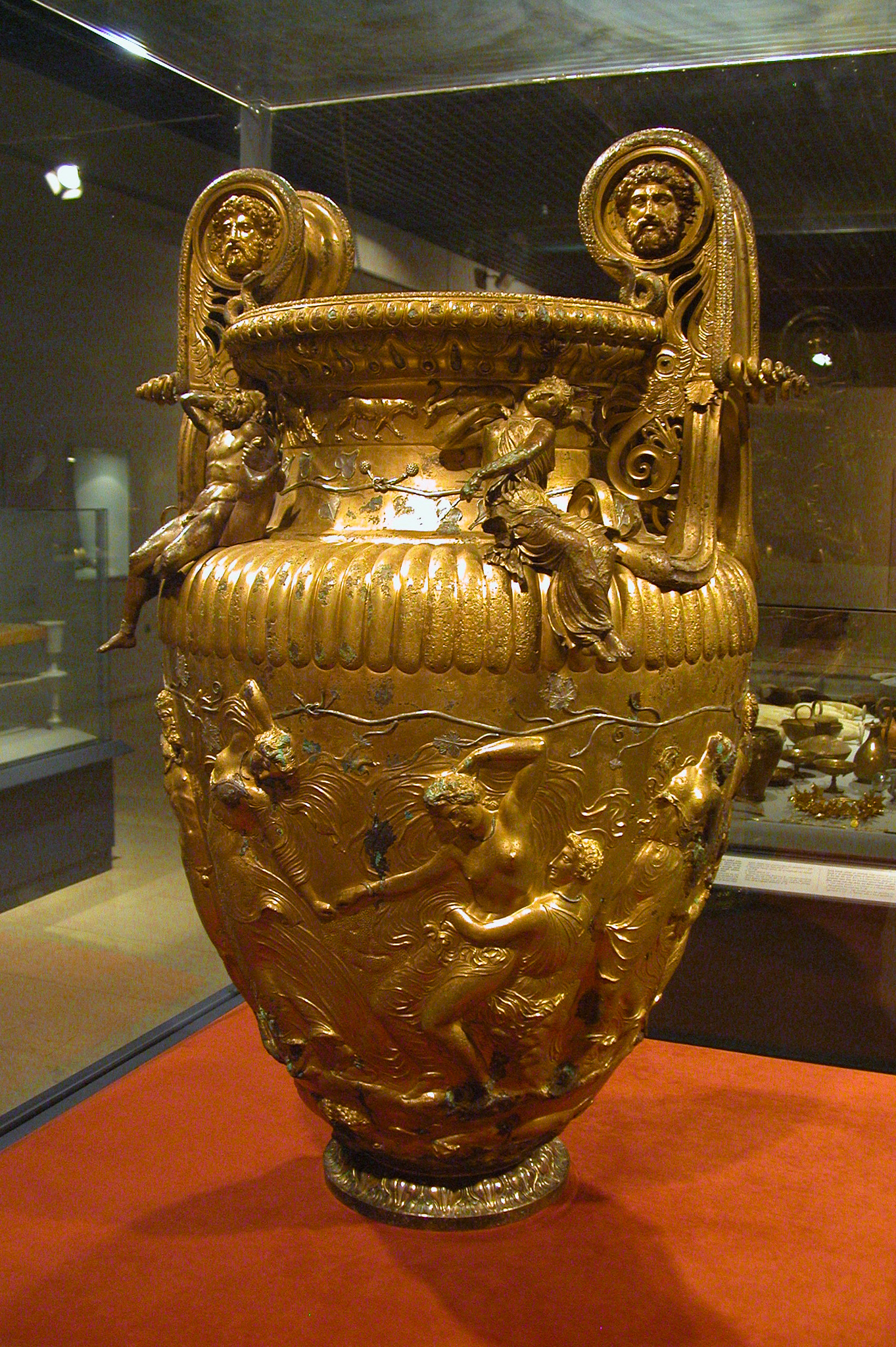
The Derveni krater, height: 90.5 cm (35 ½ in.), 4th century BC

The Dionysian Mysteries of mainland Greece and the Roman Empire are thought to have evolved from a more primitive initiatory cult of unknown origins. It spread throughout the Mediterranean region by the start of the Classical Greek period. Its spread was associated with the dissemination of wine, a sacrament or entheogen (though mead may have been the original sacrament). Beginning as a simple rite, it evolved quickly within Greek culture into a popular mystery religion, which absorbed a variety of similar cults (and their gods) in a typically Greek synthesis across its territories; one late form was the Orphic Mysteries. However, all stages of this developmental spectrum appear to have continued in parallel throughout the eastern Mediterranean until late in Greek history and forcible Christianization.

== Early Dionysus cult ==
The ecstatic cult of Dionysus was originally thought to be a late arrival in Greece from Thrace or Asia Minor, due to its popularity in both locations and Dionysus' non-integration into the Olympian Pantheon. After the deity's name was discovered on Mycenean Linear B tablets, however, this theory was abandoned and the cult is considered indigenous, predating Greek civilization. The absence of an early Olympian Dionysus is today explained by patterns of social exclusion and the cult's marginality, rather than chronology. Whether the cult originated on Minoan Crete (as an aspect of an ancient Zagreus) or Africa—or in Thrace or Asia, as a proto-Sabazius—is unanswerable, due to lack of evidence. Some scholars believe it was an adopted cult not native to any of these places and may have been an eclectic cult in its earliest history, although it almost certainly obtained many familiar features from Minoan culture.

=== Role of wine ===
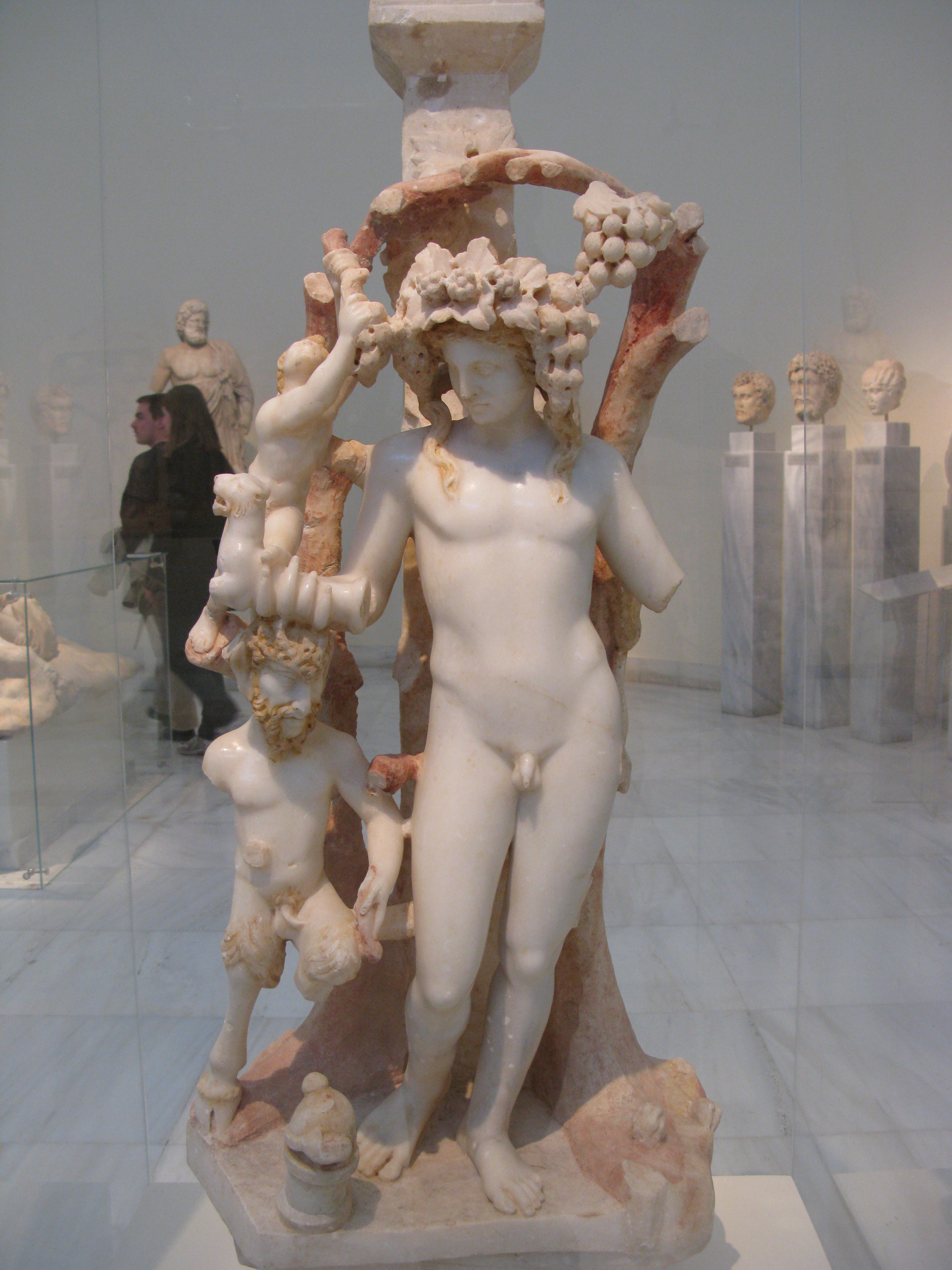
Marble table support adorned by a group including Dionysus, Pan and a Satyr; Dionysus holds a rhyton (drinking vessel) in the shape of a panther; traces of red and yellow colour are preserved on the hair of the figures and the branches. From an Asia Minor workshop, 170–180 AD, National Archaeological Museum, Athens, Greece.

The original rite of Dionysus is associated with a wine cult (not unlike the entheogenic cults of ancient Central America), concerned with the grapevine's cultivation and an understanding of its life cycle (believed to have embodied the living god) and the fermentation of wine from its dismembered body (associated with the god's essence in the underworld). The intoxicating and disinhibiting effects of wine were regarded as caused by possession by the god's spirit. Wine was also poured on the earth and its growing vine, completing the cycle. The cult was not solely concerned with the vine itself, but also with the other components of wine. Wine includes other ingredients (herbal, floral, and resinous) adding to its quality, flavour, and medicinal properties.

Scholars have suggested that, given the low alcoholic content of early wine, its effects may have been due to an additional psychoactive ingredient in its sacramental form, supported by iconography showing herbs being mixed with the wine in the kraters, especially preceding ecstatic behavior. Poppy, from which opium is extracted, is a likely candidate, being sometimes worn as a wreath by the god in art. Also, honey and beeswax were often added to wine, introducing an even older drink (mead). Károly Kerényi postulated that this wine lore superseded (and partly absorbed) earlier Neolithic mead lore involving bee swarms associated by the Greeks with Dionysus. Mead and beer (with its cereal base) were incorporated into the domain of Dionysus, perhaps through his identification with the Thracian corn deity Sabazius.

Other plants believed to be viniculturally significant were also included in wine lore such as ivy (thought to counteract drunkenness—thus the opposite of the grapevine—and seen as blooming in winter instead of summer); the fig (a purgative of toxins) and the pine (a wine preservative). The bull (from whose horn wine was drunk) and goat (whose flesh provided wineskins, and whose browsing pruned the vines) were also part of the cult, eventually seen as manifestations of Dionysus. Some of these associations had been linked with fertility deities (like Dionysus) and became part of his new role. An understanding of vinicultural lore and its symbolism is key to understanding the cult which emerged from it, assuming a significance other than winemaking that would encompass life, death, and rebirth and providing insight into human psychology.

=== Rites ===
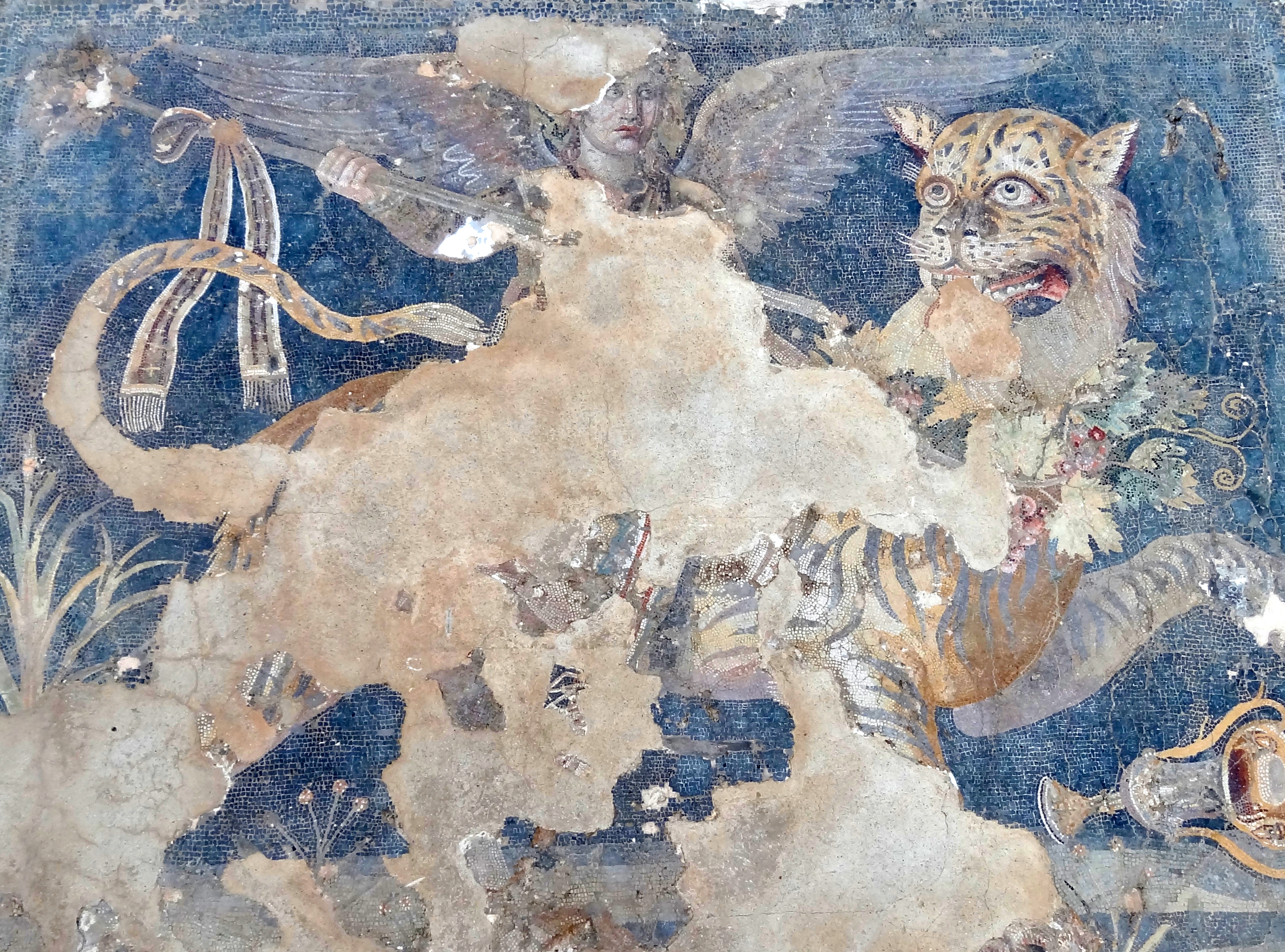
A Hellenistic Greek mosaic depicting the god Dionysos as a winged daimon riding on a tiger, from the House of Dionysos at Delos (which was once controlled by Athens) in the South Aegean region of Greece, late 2nd century BC, Archaeological Museum of Delos

The rites were based on a seasonal death-rebirth theme, common among agricultural cults such as the Eleusinian Mysteries. The Osirian Mysteries paralleled the Dionysian, according to contemporary Greek and Egyptian observers. Spirit possession involved liberation from civilization's rules and constraints. It celebrated that which was outside civilized society and a return to primordial nature—which would later assume mystical overtones. It also involved escape from the socialized personality and ego into an ecstatic, deified state or the primal herd (sometimes both). In this sense Dionysus was the beast-god within, or the unconscious mind of modern psychology. Such activity has been interpreted as fertilizing, invigorating, cathartic, liberating, and transformative, and so appealed to those on the margins of society: women, slaves, outlaws, and "foreigners" (non-citizens, in Greek democracy). All were equal in a cult that inverted their roles, similar to the Roman Saturnalia.

The trance induction central to the cult involved not only chemognosis (an altered state caused by drug use), but an "invocation of spirit" with the bullroarer and communal dancing to drum and pipe. The trances are described in familiar anthropological terms, with characteristic movements (such as the backward head flick found in all trance-inducing cults found today in Afro-American Vodou and its counterparts). As in Vodou rites, certain rhythms were associated with the trance. Rhythms are also found preserved in Greek prose referring to the Dionysian rites (such as Euripides' The Bacchae). This collection of classical quotes describes rites in the Greek countryside in the mountains, to which processions were made on feast days:

Following the torches as they dipped and swayed in the darkness, they climbed mountain paths with head thrown back and eyes glazed, dancing to the beat of the drum which stirred their blood' [or 'staggered drunkenly with what was known as the Dionysus gait']. 'In this state of ekstasis or enthusiasmos, they abandoned themselves, dancing wildly and shouting 'Euoi!' [the god's name] and at that moment of intense rapture became identified with the god himself. They became filled with his spirit and acquired divine powers.

This practice is demonstrated in Greek culture by the Bacchanals of the Maenads, Thyiades, and Bacchoi; many Greek rulers considered the cult a threat to civilized society and wished to control it (if not suppress it altogether). The latter failed; the former would succeed in the foundation of a domesticated Dionysianism as a state religion in Athens. This was but one form of Dionysianism—a cult which assumed different forms in different localities (often absorbing indigenous divinities and their rites, as did Dionysus himself). The Greek Bacchoi claimed that, like wine, Dionysus had a different flavour in different regions; reflecting their mythical and cultural soil, he appeared under different names and appearances in different regions.

=== Bacchic gold tablets ===
The so-called Bacchic gold tablets (also known as Totenpass, German for "passport for the death") are small gold tablets, often only a few centimeters tall, that were found all over the Greek world (Crete, Thessaly, Macedonia, Magna Graecia, Rome). Dating from the 5th century BC to the 3rd century AD, some tablets contain inscriptions written in Greek, primarily in hexameter verse. Initiates into the mysteries were buried with these gold tablets as "reminders" (mnēmosyna) of what they experienced during the initiation ceremony. The most current scholary edition by Christian Zgoll comprises 53 known specimens.

The texts provide instructions for the initiate's later arrival in the underworld: avoiding a particular spring at a white cypress, and instead looking for the "Lake of Mnemosyne" (Lake of Memory) and answering a ritual challenge with a specific formula. These texts have often been interpreted as either relating to the arrival in the underworld or as related to initiation practices. Christian Zgoll proposes a so called Doppelspiegelszenario ("double-mirror-scenario"). According to his interpretation, the tablets are mainly related to the ritual dimension with the afterlife being a secondary concern. During the initiation ceremony, the initiates experienced a ritual death which anticipated their later physical death and arrival in the underworld. Conversely, the imagined underworld scenario reflects back onto the ritual itself, and thus, the texts create an "inseparable unity".

The ritual texts suggest that during the initiation process the initiates have already become gods during their own lifetime. The tablets thus function similarly to modern passports: They are proof of the initiation and the divine status of the deceased and therefore allow entry into the underworld.

=== Dionysian paraphernalia ===
- Kantharos, drinking cup with large handles, originally the rhyton (drinking horn from a bull), later a kylix, or wine goblet
- Thyrsus, long wand with a pine cone on top, carried by initiates and those possessed by the god
- Stave, once cast into the ground to mark ritual space
- Krater, mixing bowl
- Flagellum, a scourge
- Minoan double axe, once used for sacrificial rites, later replaced by the Greek kopis (curved dagger)
- Retis, hunter's net
- Laurel crown and cloak, purple robe, or leopard or fawnskin nebix
- Hunting boots
- Persona masks
- Bullroarer
- Salpinx, long, straight trumpet
- Pan flute
- Tympanon, a frame drum
- Liknon, sacred basket with fig

=== Traditional offerings to Dionysus ===
Musk, frankincense, storax, ivy, grapes, pine, fig, wine, honey, apples, Indian hemp, orchis root, thistle, all wild and domestic trees.

=== Animals sacred to Dionysus ===
Dionysus has numerous sacred animals, such as the leopard or bull. Other sacred animals include: lions and other big cats, goats, donkeys, and serpents.

The bull and goat and their "enemies", the panther (or any big cat—after the Greeks colonized part of India, Shiva's tiger sometimes replaced the traditional panther or leopard) and the serpent (probably derived from Sabazius, but also found in North African cults); in addition, the dolphin, the lion, and the bee.

Dionysus's association with bulls is found in multiple epithets. In The Bacchae, Pentheus, who opposed his worship in the god's origin city of Thebes, saw horns upon Dionysus's head as he started to go mad.

== Inscription about the mysteries in Plovdiv ==
A Roman inscription dated to 253–255 AD and written in Ancient Greek on a stele used in the construction of the Great Basilica at Plovdiv was discovered in the basilica in 2019. The inscription refers to the Dionysian Mysteries and also makes mention of Roman emperors Valerian and Gallienus.

== See also ==
- Anthesteria, Ascolia, Dionysia, and Lenaia
- Ancient Greece and wine
- Ancient Rome and wine
- Bacchanalia and Liberalia
- Dionysus Cup, painted Attic drinking cup
- Greco-Roman mysteries
- Hellenistic religion
- Maiuma (festival) dedicated to Dionysus and Aphrodite
- Theatre of Dionysus in Athens
- Tyrnavos, Greek town and famous carnival venue
