= Eleusinian Mysteries Hydria =

4th-century BC ancient Greek vase

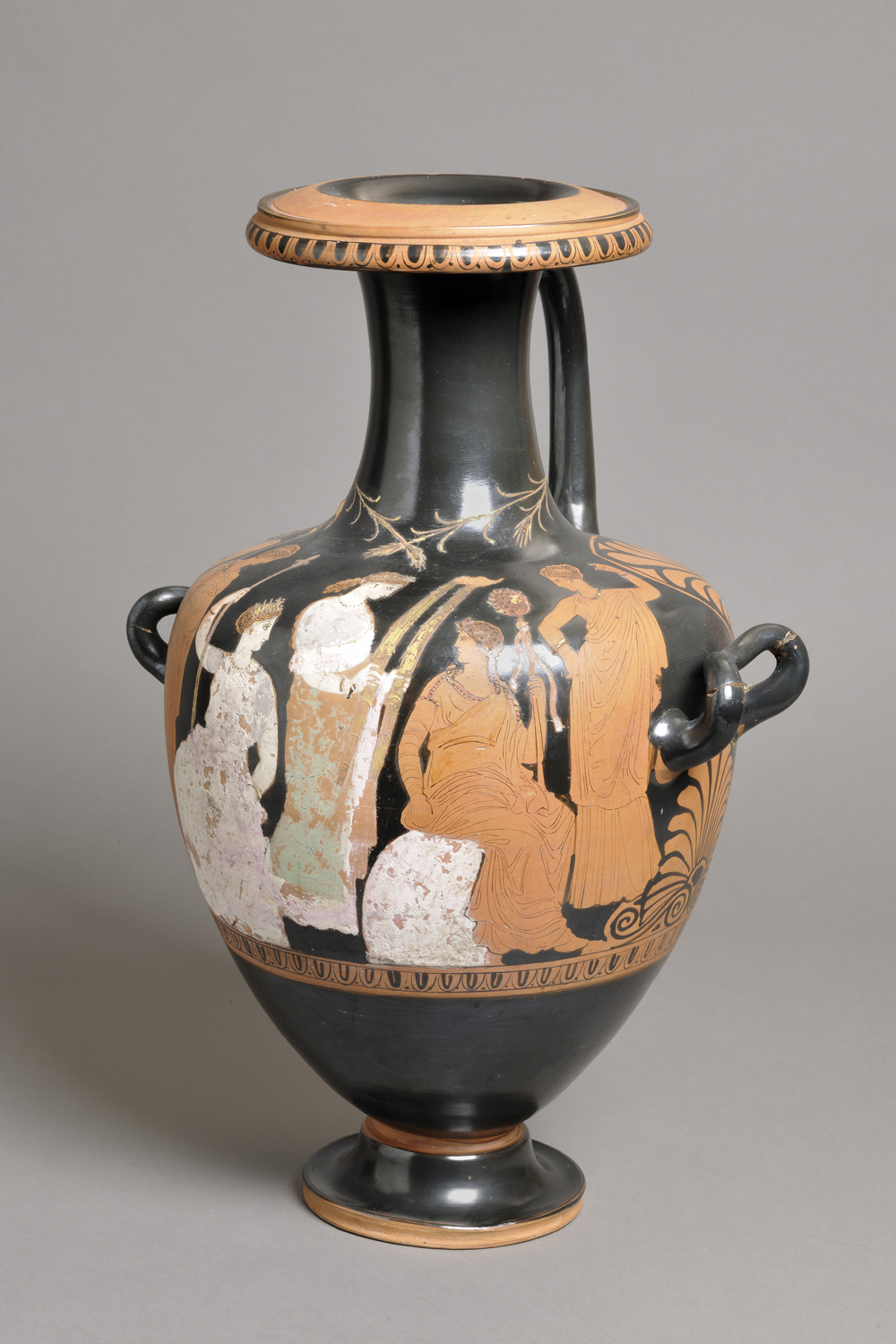
- Artist: Unknown
- Year: circa 375-350 B.C. (discovered 1883)
- Type: Kerch vase
- Dimensions: Height: 46.5 cm; Length: 25.5 cm
- Location: Museum of Fine Arts of Lyon, Lyon

The Eleusinian Mysteries hydria from Capua is a 4th-century BCE ancient Greek red-figure hydria, showing the reunion of Demeter and Persephone at the start of each spring. It was used to celebrate the Eleusinian Mysteries and the rebirth of nature in the secret cult of the two goddesses. The vase was found in 1883, along with another large vase, in a tomb in the Santa Maria necropolis in Capua in southern Italy. It dates back to between 375 BCE and 350 BCE. It is theorized that the vase had been buried with a former pilgrim to Eleusis. It is painted in the Kerch style and is held by the Museum of Fine Arts of Lyon.

Several other hydriai featuring Eleusinian scenes have been found; one, found on Crete, is held by the National Archaeological Museum, Athens, another, from Rhodes, is held by the Museum of Classical Antiquities, Istanbul, and one from Cumae, also in southern Italy, is held in the Hermitage Museum, St. Petersburg.

== Description ==
The object is an Athenian hydria, a three-handled jug for water. It is black with a soft, metallic-like gloss. The vase is illustrated by a scene from the Eleusinian Mysteries, showing five characters on its side: Persephone, Demeter, Dionysus, Triptolemus, and a maenad. The colors green, pink, grey, white and golden help to identify the figures. Persephone is standing in the center, dressed in a pale pink chiton, and sea green himation. She is crowned with gold leaves, and her hair is tied in a bun. She is adorned with earrings, a necklace, bracelets, a brooch or clasp, and gold buttons. She holds two torches, also golden, associated with the kingdom of the dead from which the goddess returns. Just to the left, her mother Demeter is also draped with a soft pink chiton, adorned with bracelets, a brooch or clasp, earrings and a golden diadem decorated with bosses and rays. Her left arm rests on the seat on which she is seated, originally painted with alternately white and pink bands, while her right arm holds her golden scepter.

To the right of Persephone stands Dionysus, recognizable by his traditional attribute, the thyrse: a stick surrounded by leaves, surmounted by a pine cone and here adorned with pink stripes, which he holds in his left hand. The god of vines and wine is crowned with golden ivy, he also had a pink tint, although today its color is closer to that of the red figures. He sits on the omphalos, also known as the world's navel, a symbolic point or center. Here, he is associated with the cult of Demeter with which he took his place in Eleusis when he was not part of the myth at the origin, but for a reason now unknown.

Framing the scene are secondary characters, with the red color of the cooked clay: a maenad playing the tambourine, and a dancing Triptolemus, "king of Eleusis", who passed on agriculture to men, according to the teaching of Demeter, the heart of the cult of Eleusis. The vase does not tell an episode of the myth itself, but the characters present evoke the cycle of the seasons and the spring rebirth, when Persephone joins her mother Demeter, goddess of the Earth after the winter spent in the underworld with her husband Hades. The meeting of the mother and daughter lead to the renewal of the flora and thus of the harvests, at the origin of the cult.

== Provenance ==
The vase entered the collection of Alessandro Castellani before being sold in the Palazzo Castellani sale in Rome from 17 March to 10 April 1884. It was then bought by Michał Tyszkiewicz. When his collection was sold in Paris in 1898, it was bought by the Museum of Fine Arts of Lyon.
