= Therapeutae of Asclepius =

Greek association of a god of medicine

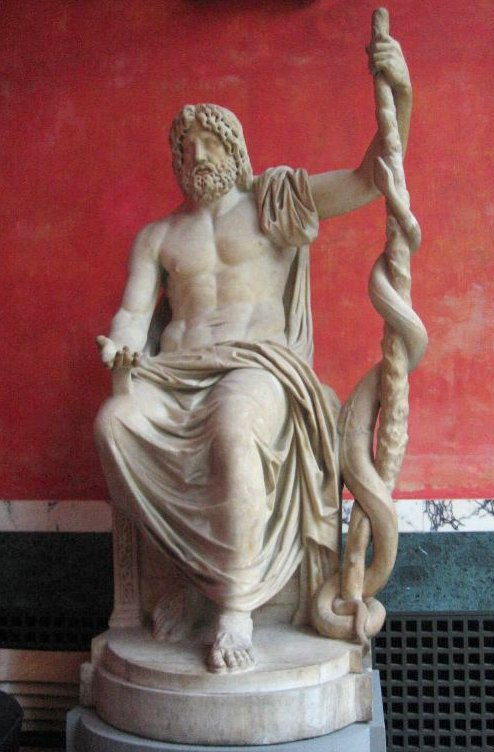
Symbolic statue of Asclepius holding the Rod of Asclepius, in later times was confused with the caduceus, which has two snakes

The therapeutae of Asclepius were a recognized and designated association in antiquity that included the physicians, their attendants and support staff, in the larger temples of Asclepius. These healing temples were known as Asclepeions. Examples of famous therapeutae of Asclepius prior to 300 BCE include many presocratic philosophers such as Parmenides and Empedocles according to ongoing scholarship. Asclepeion's between 300 BCE and 300 CE include Hippocrates, Apollonius of Tyana, Aelius Aristides and Galen.

The Greek word therapeutes θεραπευτής has the primary meaning of 'one who serves the gods, 'worshipper', or one who is or attendant to the gods. Therapeutae (plural) is Latin from the Greek plural Therapeutai (Θεραπευταί). The related adjective therapeutikos carry in later texts the meaning of attending to heal, or treating in a spiritual or medical sense. The Greek feminine plural Therapeutrides (Θεραπευτρίδες) is sometimes encountered for their female members. The term therapeutae may occur in relation to followers of Asclepius at Pergamon, and therapeutai may also occur in relation to worshippers of Sarapis in inscriptions, such as on Delos.

Aelius Aristides in the later 2nd century writes: "We Asclepius therapeutae must agree with the god that Pergamum is the best of his sanctuaries." - Sacred Tales (39.5) Galen used his designation of "therapeutae" to secure from the Roman emperor Marcus Aurelius exemption from military service.

The book Voluntary Associations in the Graeco-Roman World states: "Some therapeutae are known to have rented apartments within the sanctuary in order to be close to the deity (Apileius, Met, 11.19.1). Very little is known about the purpose of the therapeutae. Vidman thinks they were simple worshipers united in a loose association (1970:69, 125-38). cf. therapeutae of Asclepius at Perganon (Habicht 1969: 114-115)"

The following authors (in their books) make reference to the therapeutae:

- Aelian: De Natura Animalium, Varia Historia
- Aristides: Orationes
- Athenaeus: The Deipnosophists
- Basil: Epistulae
- Claudius Ptolemy: Tetrabiblos
- Clement of Alexandria: Protrepticus
- Dionysius of Halicarnassus: Antiquitates Romanae Books I-III, VII-IX
- Eusebius of Caesarea: Historia ecclesiastica
- Greek Anthology: Volume II
- John of Damascus: Vita Barlaam et Joasaph
- Julian the Emperor: Epistulae
- Plato: Euthydemus, Protagoras, Gorgias, Meno, Laws, Parmenides, Philebus, Symposium, Phaedrus, Republic
- Plutarch: Maxime cum principbus philosopho esse diserendum
- Strabo: Geography
- Xenophon: Cyropaedia
