= Metagenes of Athens =

Ancient Athenian engineer and architect

Metagenes of Xypete (Ancient Greek: Μεταγένης ο Ξυπέτιος) was an ancient Athenian engineer and architect who flourished in the 5th century BC.

== Biography ==
Metagenes of Xypete originated from the Demos of Xypete, in ancient Athens, today's municipality of Moschato, hence his nickname, where he is said to have lived during the time of Pericles. His most significant work is reported to be the completion of the Telesterion of Eleusis, when after the death of Coroebus, he took over the continuation of the unfinished project.

Continuing the construction work, according to Plutarch, Metagenes strengthened the foundations of the building and proceeded with the construction of the upper entablature by adding columns, thus increasing their total number to 42, thereby completing the project with architraves and pediments.

== Bibliography ==
- "Plutarch, Pericles". Perseus Library. "ἀποθανόντος δὲ τούτου Μεταγένης ὁ Ξυπέτιος τὸ διάζωμα καὶ τοὺς ἄνω κίονας ἐπέστησε//upon his death, Metagenes of Xypete set up the frieze and the upper columns."
- Κ. Γεωργακόπουλος "Αρχαίοι Έλληνες Θετικοί Επιστήμονες" Εκδ. Γεωργιάδης Αθήναι 1995, ISBN 960-316-058-X
- Kourouniotis K. - Travlos I. "Telesterion and Temple of Demeter", Eleusis (Archaeological Bulletin XV), 1933-1935.
- Dinsmoor, W.B. "The Architecture of Ancient Greece" W.W. Norton - N. York - London 1975.
- Corso, A. "Gli architetti di Eleusi nell'eta di Pericle" - Atti del Istituto Veneto di Scienza, Lettere e Arti 140, 1981-1982, σελ.195-215.
- Müller, W. "Architekten in der Welt der AntiKe. Verlag für Architektur Artemis" - Zürich und München, 1989.
