= Darrhon =

Paeonian god of healing

Darrhon or Darron (Ancient Greek: Δάῤῥων) was a Paeonian god of healing, whose cult was adopted by the ancient Macedonians, as mentioned by Hesychius, as a Macedonian minor god. He is attested hapax in one inscription from Pella, c. 200–150 BC:

Ἀμφίπολις Δάρρωνι εὐξαμένη ἐπηκόωι.
Amphípolis Dárrhōni euxaménē epēkóōi
Amphipolis who prayed to benevolent Darrhon.

Excavations have revealed a sanctuary of Darrhon in the site of ancient Pella. It has been argued that while Darrhon was initially a minor deity, he was later identified and worshiped as Asclepius, the Greek god of medicine.

== Etymology ==
It has been suggested that "Darrhon" is a Macedonian-styled name of Greek participle θαρρῶν tharrhon, meaning "giving courage, making bold". Θάρρων, Tharrhon, is an Eretrian eponym. Alternatively, his name might be derived from the Thracian tribe of Derrones in the north part of the Strymon valley, compare Apollo Derenus in Abdera.

== See also ==
- Apollo
- Eileithyia
- Hygeia
- Panacea
