= Alessandro Castellani =

Italian goldsmith (1823–1883)

Alessandro Castellani

Alessandro Castellani (2 February 1823 – 10 June 1883) was a goldsmith, antique dealer, art collector and Italian patriot belonging to the Roman Castellani family of goldsmiths and antique dealers.

== Biography ==
Alessandro Castellani was the son of Fortunato Pio Castellani and Carolina Baccani. He was born in Rome. He lost his left hand in a hunting accident as a boy; despite his disability he still dedicated himself to the art of goldsmithing in the family business.

The younger Castellani was a follower of the Italian nationalist leader Giuseppe Mazzini, and supported the Roman Republic. With the restoration and return of Pius IX, he was sentenced to exile in 1859 and he went to Paris in June 1860.

In Paris he opened a branch of his father's company on the Champs-Élysées and began the diffusion of Castellani jewels into Europe and then in the United States. In 1861, Alessandro opened a second branch in London. This workshop, managed by Carlo Giuliano, focused on crafting pieces in the Archaeological Revival style. The London location served to introduce Castellani jewelry to a wider audience, particularly among British clients and collectors. The composer Gioacchino Rossini introduced him to the society of Paris. Alessandro had direct contact with Emperor Napoleon III who bought numerous finds for the Musée Napoléon III(then transferred at the Louvre) .

Alessandro Castellani was interested in the goldsmith techniques of the Etruscans and in particular in granulation. It has been hypothesized that some Etruscan finds traded by Castellani were fake.

Alessandro Castellani played a significant role in organizing exhibitions that showcased the firm's work, notably in Florence (1861) and London (1862),

In 1862, Castellani moved to Naples and opened a new office in Chiatamone. He financed attempted insurrections in the Papal States; after the Porta Pia breach he established a commission for the protection of monuments in Rome aiming to transfer the Vatican Museums to the Italian state. In 1879 he joined the Lega della democrazia chaired by Giuseppe Garibaldi.

During his time in Italy, Alessandro Castellani personally participated in archaeological excavations, including at Santa Maria di Capua, and initiated the excavation of the Tiber riverbed in 1870. These activities provided inspiration and materials for the firm's archaeological revival jewelry.

Castellani died in 1883. In 1884 his collection was sold in Rome.

== Bibliography ==
- Gabriella Bordenache Battaglia, Maria Grazia Gajo, Giuseppe Monsagrati, Castellani, in Dizionario biografico degli italiani, vol. 21, Roma, Istituto dell'Enciclopedia Italiana, 1978.
- Sante Guido, L'oreficeria sacra dei Castellani in Vaticano, Città del Vaticano, Edizioni Capitolo Vaticano, 2011, ISBN 978-88-6339-022-3
- I Castellani e l'oreficeria archeologica italiana : New York, the bard graduate center for studies in the decorative arts, 18 novembre 2004-6 febbraio 2005; Londra, Somerset house, 5 maggio-18 settembre 2005; Roma, Museo Nazionale Etrusco di Villa Giulia, 11 novembre 2005-26 febbraio 2006, Roma: "L'Erma" di Bretschneider, 2005, ISBN 978-88-8265-354-5
