= Epidauria (festival) =

Ancient Greek festival

The Epidauria (Ancient Greek: Επιδαύρια) was an ancient religious festival held in Athens, as part of the Great Eleusinian Mysteries, commemorating the initiation of Asclepius into these sacred rites.

== Description ==
According to tradition, it served as a supplementary sacrifice for those who arrived late, and it was instituted specifically for Asclepius, who himself was late to the mysteries.

The celebration of the Epidauria continued into the night as an all-night vigil, known as "pannychis," as indicated by an ancient inscription found in 1876 at the Asclepieion in Athens, dating back to 136 BCE. This inscription also mentions a priest who offered his daughter as a participant in the rites ("arrephoros for the Epidauria"). Based on this event and other references to "kanephoroi" (women carrying sacred baskets), the scholar Leéhat concluded that during the festival, a sacred procession took place, starting from the Eleusinion and reaching either the Asclepieion or the sacred altar of Demeter Chloe.

The German scholar Ludwig Preller identified the 19th day of the month Boedromion as the date of the Epidauria, suggesting that it marked the final phase of the preparatory ceremonies of the Eleusinian Mysteries held in Athens, during which the grand sacred procession would commence. This view was also supported by F. Lenormant.

In 1876, an archaeological excavation uncovered a relief plaque at the Asclepieion in Athens, depicting part of the Epidauria festival. The plaque shows, from left to right, Persephone standing with a lit double torch, seated next to her on a circular platform is the goddess Demeter. Beside Demeter, Asclepius is depicted standing and gazing at the "arrephoros" sacred procession approaching the holy site. This depiction clearly shows that the Epidauria was one of the festivals honoring the chthonic deities worshipped in ancient Greece.

== Bibliography ==
- Great Greek Encyclopedia, Vol. XI, p. 336
- Peck, Harry Thurston (1898). "Eleusinia". Harpers Dictionary of Classical Antiquities.
- Smith, William (1890). "Eleusinia". In Wayte, William; Marindin, G. E. (eds.). A Dictionary of Greek and Roman Antiquities.
- Parke, H.W., Festivals of the Athenians, 1977
- Preller, Ludwig (1837). Demeter und Persephone.
