= Kykeon =

Ancient Greek drink

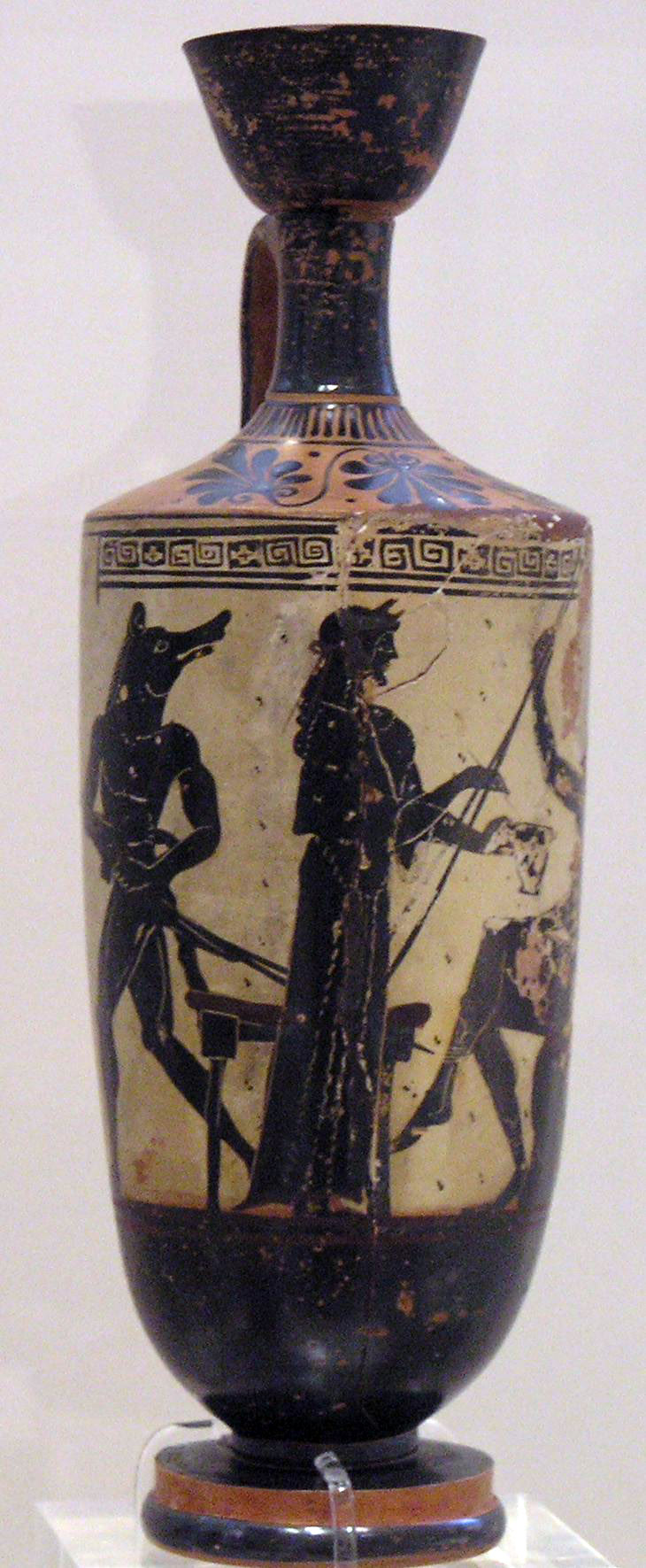
Circe and Odysseus, white-ground lekythos by the Athena Painter, ca. 490–480 BC. From Eretria National Archaeological Museum in Athens, 1133.

Kykeon (Ancient Greek: κυκεών, kykeȏn; from κυκάω, kükáō; "to stir, to mix") was an Ancient Greek drink of varied description. Some were made of water, barley and naturally occurring substances. Others were made with wine and grated cheese. It is widely believed that kykeon refers to a psychoactive brew, as in the case of the Eleusinian Mysteries. A kykeon was used at the climax of the Eleusinian Mysteries to break a sacred fast, but it is also mentioned as a favourite drink of Greek peasants.

== Ancient sources and description ==
Kykeon is mentioned in Homeric texts: the Iliad describes it as consisting of Pramnian wine, barley, and grated goat's cheese. In the Odyssey, Circe adds some honey and pours her magic potion into it. In the Homeric Hymn to Demeter, the goddess refuses red wine but accepts kykeon made from water, barley, and pennyroyal.

Pennyroyal, a type of mint, was supposed to have digestive properties: In Aristophanes' Peace Hermes recommends it to the hero who ate too much dry fruit and nuts. Pennyroyal was also said to have medicinal qualities for women, acting as a contraceptive and abortifacient and in birthing and nursing the newborn. This possibly could have linked the Eleusinian mysteries to female sexuality. However, its use as a digestive aid could have also been useful in breaking a fast.

Aristocrats shunned it as a peasant drink: Theophrastus' Characters depicts a peasant who goes to the Ecclesia drunk with kykeon.

== Eleusinian Mysteries ==
In an attempt to solve the mystery of how so many people over the span of two millennia could have consistently experienced revelatory states during the culminating ceremony of the Eleusinian Mysteries, it has been posited that the barley used in the Eleusinian kykeon was parasitized by ergot, and that the psychoactive properties of that fungus triggered the intense experiences alluded to by the participants at Eleusis. Ergot is a common fungus that can infect cereal grains such as barley, a main ingredient in the kykeon.

Albert Hoffmann has confirmed that the ergot of barley would contain two psychoactive alkaloids, ergonovine and lysergic acid amide. Research has shown that lysergamides such as lysergic acid amide and iso-LSA can be generated from ergot alkaloids under experimentally demonstrated mildly alkaline preparation conditions, consistent with methods plausibly available in antiquity. Such alkaloids are soluble in water, meaning that it would have been relatively easy to prepare a hallucinogenic solution. However, there was a lack of evidence that the kykeon would have contained ergot until the excavations at a site in Girona, Spain, Mas Castellar de Pontós. According to Dr. Denise Demetriou, this site would have been multi-ethnic and contained open access sanctuaries, one of which being a part of the Eleusinian mysteries. During the excavations at the Girona site, Dr. Enriqueta Pons discovered a main chapel that happened to contain kraters depicting scenes of the Eleusinian rites. This discovery confirmed the link between the site and the Eleusinian mysteries. Two artifacts found in the chapel were found to contain traces of ergot sclerotia, a chalice linked to the kykeon and between the teeth of a human jawbone. The presence of ergot found in items that are connected to the Eleusinian mysteries has compelled some historians to believe that this evidence confirms the use of entheogenic substances, primarily ergot which grew on barley. These proponents argue that while not every Eleusinian cult used ergot, it is more than likely that the use of ergot was not uncommon in the mysteries and was prevalent in helping the initiates find divinity. Others, such as Walter Burkert, have rejected the idea of ergot being used, but acknowledge the possibility of other entheogenic substances in the mysteries. Another possibility could be opium, as the poppy, alongside the grain of wheat, was a common attribution to Demeter. However, this theory lacks evidence to support the importation of opium to Eleusis to support thousands. Burkert argues against the use of entheogenic substances in the mysteries, and believes that the process of fasting before the initiation followed by a sacrificial meal would have been sufficient to create “communal bliss”. Because of the simplicity of this process, it would have allowed for mass religion to be easily accessible, he argues.

== See also ==
- Ancient Greece and wine
- Ancient Greek cuisine

== Bibliography ==
- Wasson, R. Gordon; Hofmann, Albert; Ruck, Carl A. P. (25 November 2008) [1978]. The Road to Eleusis: Unveiling the Secret of the Mysteries. North Atlantic Books. ISBN 978-1-55643-752-6. Archived from the original on 8 July 2022.<
- Delatte, Armand (1955). Le Cycéon, breuvage rituel des mystères d'Éleusis (in French). Paris: Belles Lettres.
