= Eleusinian Mysteries =

Secret religious rites in ancient Greece

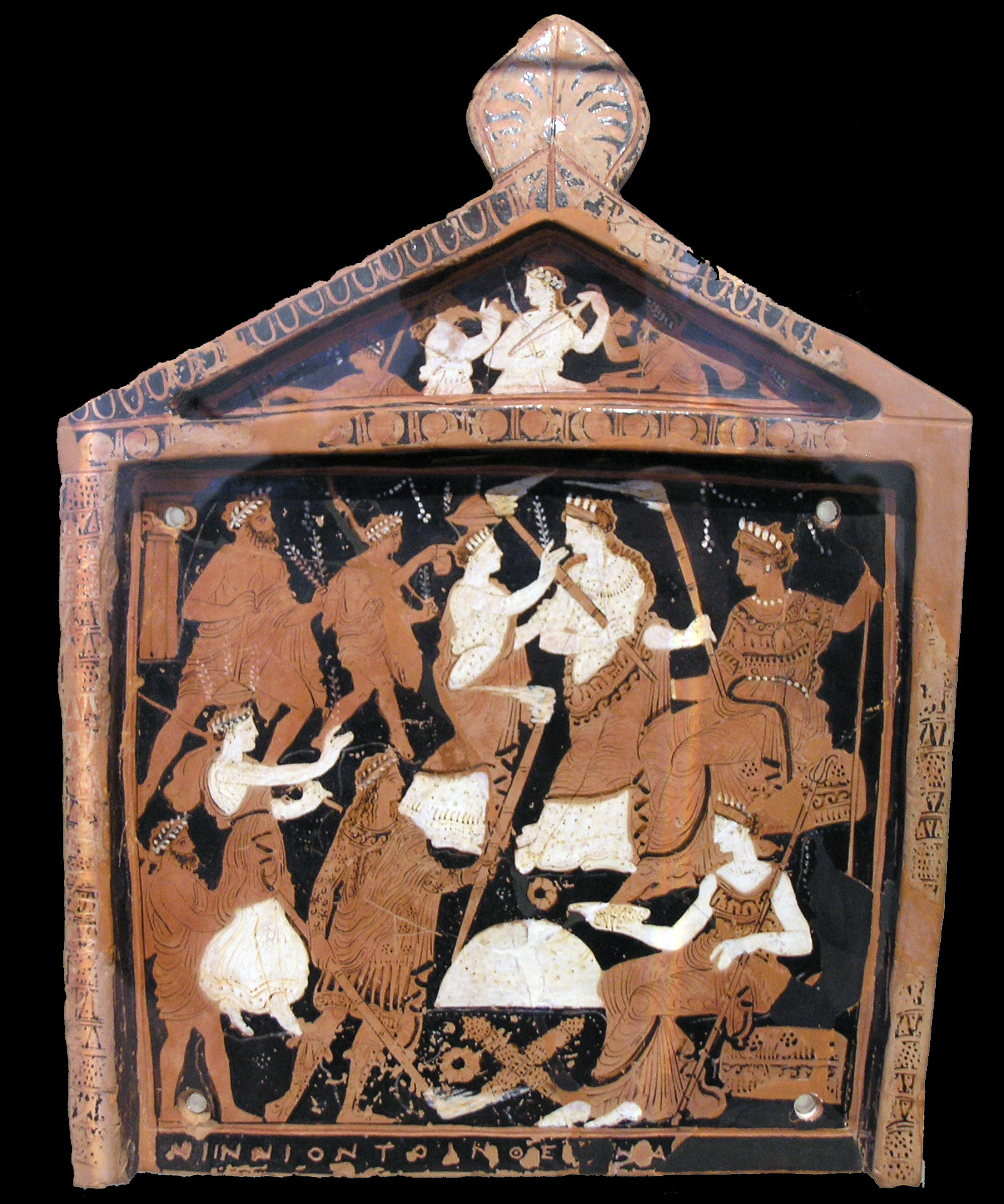
A votive plaque known as the Ninnion Tablet depicting elements of the Eleusinian Mysteries, discovered in the sanctuary at Eleusis (mid-4th century BC)

The Eleusinian Mysteries (Greek: Ἐλευσίνια Μυστήρια, romanized: Eleusínia Mystḗria) were initiations held every year for the cult of Demeter and Persephone based at the Panhellenic Sanctuary of Eleusis in ancient Greece. They are considered the "most famous of the secret religious rites of ancient Greece". Their basis was a Bronze Age agrarian cult, and there is some evidence that they were derived from the religious practices of the Mycenaean period. The Mysteries represented the myth of the abduction of Persephone from her mother Demeter by the king of the underworld Hades, in a cycle with three phases: the descent (loss), the search, and the ascent, with the main theme being the ascent (ἄνοδος) of Persephone and the reunion with her mother. It was a major festival during the Hellenic era, and later spread to Rome.

The rites, ceremonies, and beliefs were kept secret and consistently preserved from antiquity. For the initiated, the rebirth of Persephone symbolized the eternity of life which flows from generation to generation, and they believed that they would have a reward in the afterlife. There are many paintings and pieces of pottery that depict various aspects of the Mysteries. Since the Mysteries involved visions and conjuring of an afterlife, some scholars believe that the power and longevity of the Eleusinian Mysteries, a consistent set of rites, ceremonies and experiences that spanned two millennia, came from psychedelic drugs. The name of the town, Eleusis, seems to be pre-Greek, and is likely a counterpart with Elysium and the goddess Eileithyia.

== Etymology ==
Eleusinian Mysteries (Greek: Ἐλευσίνια Μυστήρια) was the name of the mysteries of the city of Eleusis.

The name of the city Eleusis is pre-Greek, and may be related with the name of the goddess Eileithyia. Her name Ἐλυσία (Elysia) in Laconia and Messene probably relates her with the month Eleusinios and Eleusis, but this is debated.

The ancient Greek word from which English mystery derives, mystḗrion (μυστήριον), means "mystery or secret rite" and is related with the verb myéō (μυέω), which means "(I) teach, initiate into the mysteries", and the noun mýstēs (μύστης), which means "one initiated". The word mystikós (μυστικός), source of the English mystic, means "connected with the mysteries", or "private, secret" (as in Modern Greek).

== Demeter and Persephone ==
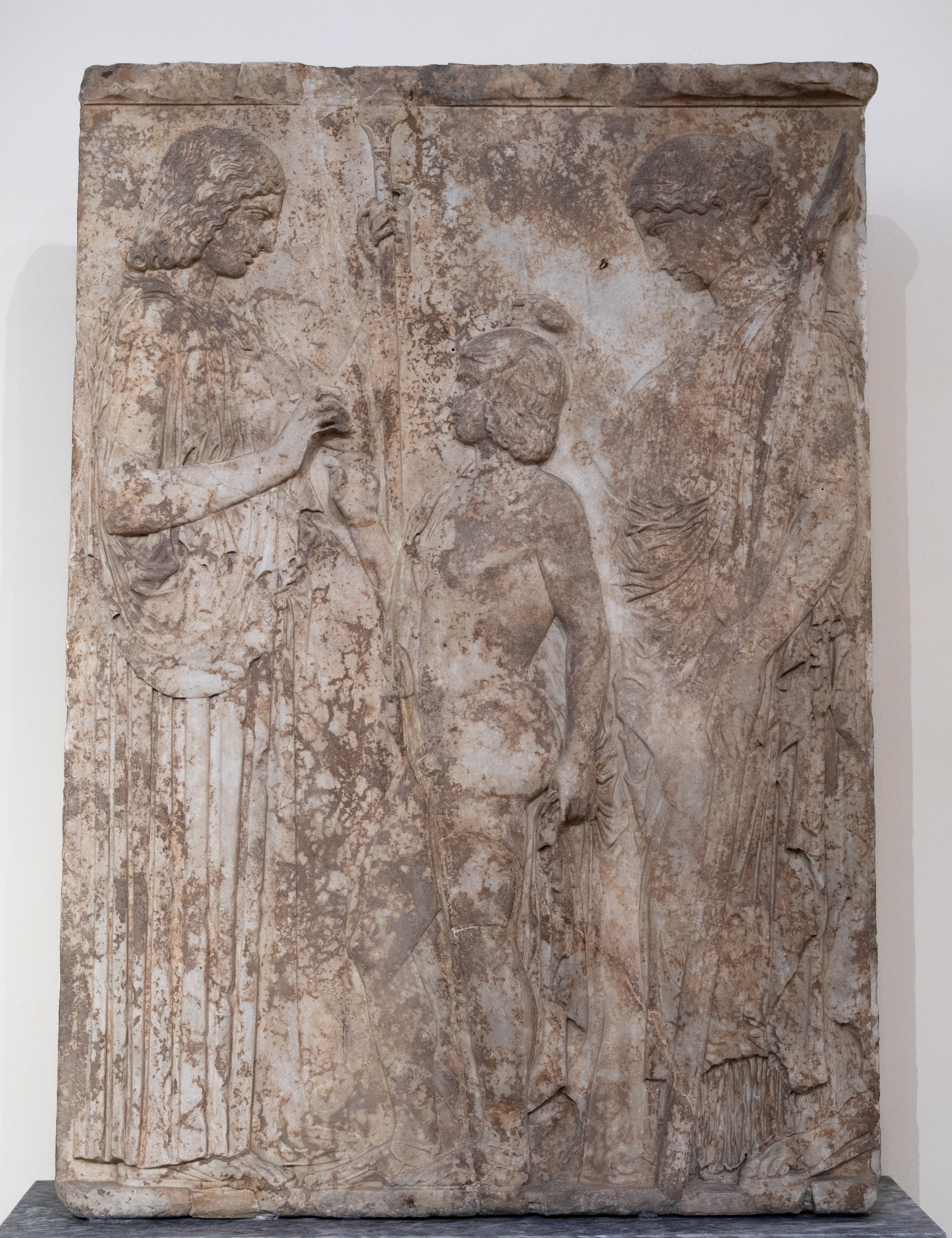
Triptolemus receiving wheat sheaves from Demeter and blessings from Persephone, Great Eleusinian Relief, 5th-century BC relief, National Archaeological Museum of Athens

The Mysteries are related to a myth concerning Demeter, the goddess of agriculture and fertility, as recounted in one of the Homeric Hymns (c. 650 BC). According to the hymn, Demeter's daughter Persephone (also referred to as Kore, "maiden") was assigned to paint all the flowers of the earth. Before completion, she was seized by Hades, the god of the underworld. Distraught, Demeter searched high and low for her daughter, with many minor adventures during her long travel; in one, she taught the secrets of agriculture to Triptolemus, a prominent hero of Eleusis. In her distress, and in hopes of persuading Zeus to allow the return of her daughter, she caused a terrible drought, killing many and depriving the gods of sacrifice and worship.

Zeus, pressed by the cries of the hungry people and by the other deities who also heard their anguish, eventually allowed Persephone to return to her mother. However, it was a rule of the Fates that whoever ate or drank in the underworld was doomed to spend eternity there. Before releasing her to Hermes, who had been sent to retrieve her, Hades had tricked Persephone into eating pomegranate seeds (either six or four according to the telling); thus, she was forced to return to the underworld for four or six months each year. During this time each year, Demeter, in her sadness, neglects to cultivate the earth until Persephone returns to her, and the cycle repeats. Persephone's rebirth symbolizes the rebirth of all plant life, and the eternity of life as it flows from one generation to another.

In the central foundation document of the mystery, the Homeric Hymn to Demeter line 415, Persephone is said to stay with Hades during winter and return to her mother in the spring of the year: "This was the day [of Persephone's return], at the very beginning of bountiful springtime." However, one scholar has proposed a different version, according to which the four months that Persephone is with Hades correspond to the dry, drought-prone Greek summer.

== Mysteries ==
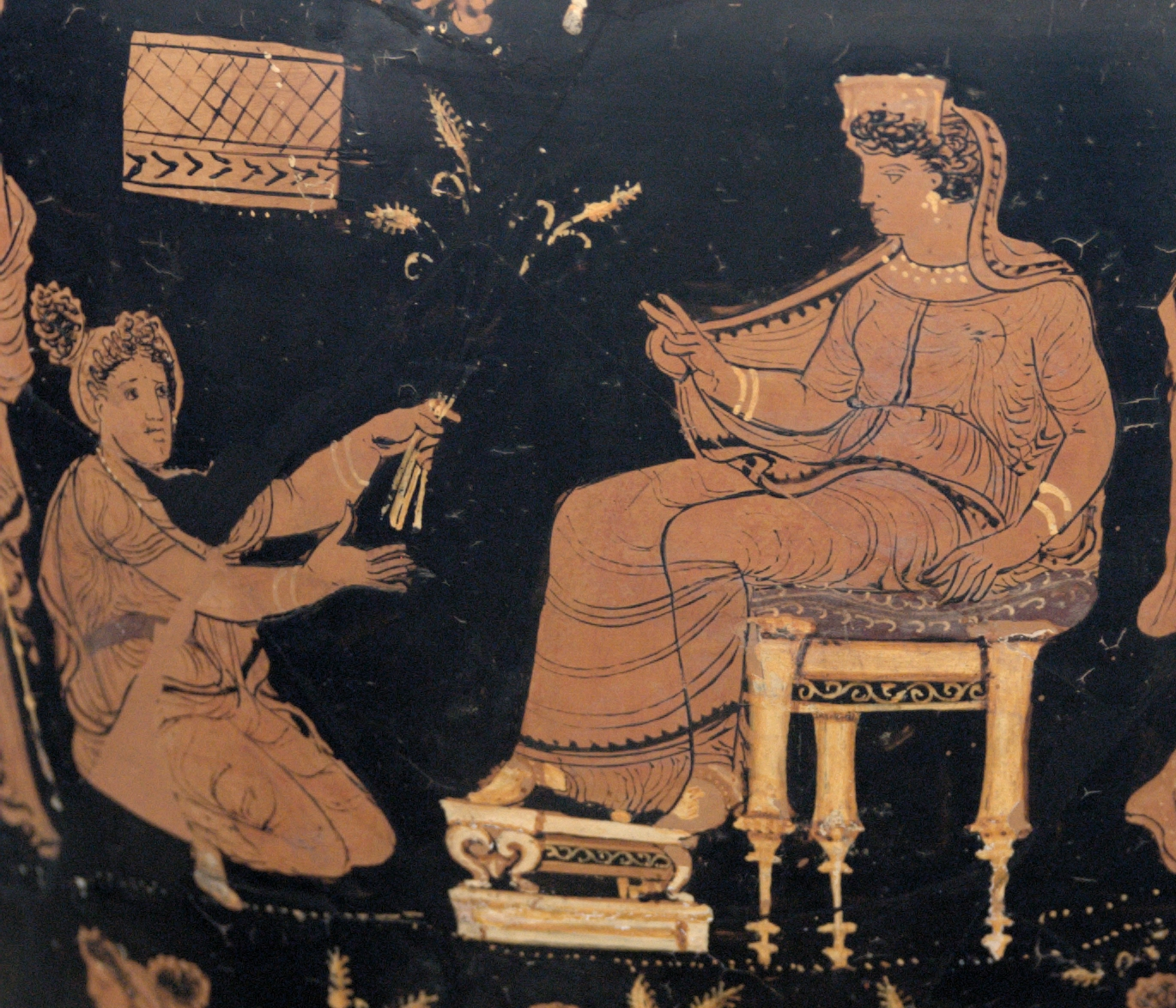
Demeter, enthroned and extending her hand in a benediction toward the kneeling Metaneira, who offers the wheat that is a recurring symbol of the mysteries (Varrese Painter, red-figure hydria, c. 340 BC, from Apulia)

The Eleusinian Mysteries are believed to have ancient origins. Some findings in the temple Eleusinion in Attica suggest that their basis was an old agrarian cult. Some practices of the mysteries seem to have been influenced by the religious practices of the Mycenaean period, thus predating the Greek Dark Ages. Excavations have shown that a private building existed under the Telesterion in the Mycenaean period; it seems that originally the cult of Demeter was private. In the Homeric Hymn is mentioned the palace of the king Keleos.

Some scholars argued that the Eleusinian cult was a continuation of a Minoan cult, and that Demeter was a poppy goddess who brought poppy from Crete to Eleusis. Some useful information from the Mycenaean period can be found from studying the cult of Despoina (the precursor goddess of Persephone) and the cult of Eileithyia, the goddess of childbirth. For example, the megaron of Despoina at Lycosura is quite similar to the Telesterion of Eleusis. Demeter is united with the god Poseidon, bearing the unnamable Despoina (the mistress). In the cave of Amnisos at Crete, the goddess Eileithyia is connected to the annual birth of the divine child, as well as to Enesidaon (The Earth Shaker), the chthonic aspect of Poseidon.

At Eleusis, inscriptions refer to "the Goddesses" accompanied by the agricultural god Triptolemus (probably son of Ge and Oceanus), and to "the God and the Goddess" (Persephone and Plouton) accompanied by Eubuleus, who probably led the way back from the underworld. The myth was represented in a cycle with three phases: the "descent", the "search", and the "ascent" (Greek anodos), with contrasted emotions from sorrow to joy meant to rouse the mystae (initiates) to exultation.

One line of thought by modern scholars has been that the Mysteries were intended "to elevate man above the human sphere into the divine and to assure his redemption by making him a god and so conferring immortality upon him". The main theme was Persephone's ascent from the underworld and her reunion with her mother Demeter. At the beginning of the feast, the priests filled two special vessels and poured them out, one towards the west and the other towards the east. The people looking to the sky and the earth shouted in a magical rhyme, "rain and conceive".

In one ritual, a child was initiated from the hearth (the divine fire). The name pais (child) appears in the Mycenaean inscriptions; this was the ritual of the "divine child", originally Ploutos. In the Homeric Hymn, the ritual is connected with the myth of the agricultural god Triptolemus. The goddess of nature survived in the mysteries where the following words were uttered: "Mighty Potnia bore a great son". Potnia (Linear B po-ti-ni-ja : lady or mistress), is a Mycenaean title applied to goddesses, probably the translation of a similar title of pre-Greek origin.

The high point of the celebration was "an ear of grain cut in silence", which represented the force of the new life. The idea of immortality did not exist in the mysteries at the beginning, but the initiated believed that they would have a better fate in the underworld. Death remained a reality, but was also a new beginning, like the plant which grows from the buried seed.

A depiction from the old palace of Phaistos is very close to the image of the anodos ("ascent") of Persephone: An armless and legless deity grows out of the ground, and her head turns to a large flower.

According to archaeologist George Mylonas, the lesser mysteries were held "as a rule once a year in the early spring in the month of flowers, the Anthesterion," while "the Greater Mysteries were held once a year and every fourth year they were celebrated with special splendor in what was known as the penteteris. Classical scholar Károly Kerényi concurs with this assessment: "The Lesser Mysteries were held at Agrai in the month of Anthesterion, our February... The initiates were not even admitted to the epopteía [Greater Mysteries] in the same year, but only in September of the following year." This cycle continued for about two millennia.

In the Homeric Hymn to Demeter, King Celeus is said to have been one of the first people to learn the secret rites and mysteries of her cult. He was also one of her original priests, along with Diocles, Eumolpos, Polyxeinus, and Triptolemus, Celeus' son, who had supposedly learned agriculture from Demeter.

Under Peisistratos of Athens, the Eleusinian Mysteries became pan-Hellenic, and pilgrims flocked from Greece and beyond to participate. Around 300 BC, the state took over control of the mysteries; they were controlled by two families, the Eumolpidae and the Kerykes. This led to a vast increase in the number of initiates. The only requirements for membership were freedom from "blood guilt", meaning never having committed murder, and not being a "barbarian" (being unable to speak Greek). Men, women, and even slaves were allowed initiation.

=== Participants ===
To participate in these mysteries, one had to take a vow of secrecy.

Four categories of people participated in the Eleusinian Mysteries:

- Priests, priestesses, and hierophants
- Those who had attained epopteía (Greek: ἐποπτεία) (contemplation), who had learned the secrets of the greatest mysteries of Demeter
- Those who had already participated at least once – they were eligible for attaining epopteía
- Initiates, undergoing the ceremony for the first time

=== Priesthood ===
The priesthood officiating at the Eleusinian Mysteries and in the sanctuary was divided into several offices with different tasks.

Six categories of priests officiated in the Eleusinian Mysteries:

- Hierophantes – male high priest, an office inherited within the Phileidae or Eumolpidae families.
- High Priestess of Demeter or Priestess of Demeter and Kore – an office inherited within the Phileidae or Eumolpidae families.
- Dadouchos – men serving as torch bearers, the second-highest male role next to Hierophantes.
- Dadouchousa Priestess – a female priestess who assisted the Dadouchos, an office inherited within the Phileidae or Eumolpidae families.
- Hierophantides – two married priestesses, one serving Demeter, and the other Persephone.
- Panageis ('the holy') or melissae ('bees') – a group of priestesses who lived a life secluded from men.

The Hierophant and the High Priestess were of equal rank. It was the task of the High Priestess to impersonate the goddesses Demeter and Persephone in the reenactment during the mysteries. Events at Eleusis were dated by the name of the reigning High Priestess.

=== Secrets ===
The outline below is only a capsule summary; much of the concrete information about the Eleusinian Mysteries was never written down. For example, only initiates knew what the kiste, a sacred chest, and the calathus, a lidded basket, contained.

Hippolytus of Rome, one of the Church Fathers writing in the early 3rd century AD, discloses in Refutation of All Heresies that "the Athenians, while initiating people into the Eleusinian rites, likewise display to those who are being admitted to the highest grade at these mysteries, the mighty, and marvellous, and most perfect secret suitable for one initiated into the highest mystic truths: an ear of grain in silence reaped."

=== Lesser Mysteries ===
There were two Eleusinian Mysteries: the Greater and the Lesser. According to Neoplatonist translator Thomas Taylor, "the dramatic shows of the Lesser Mysteries occultly signified the miseries of the soul while in subjection to the body, so those of the Greater obscurely intimated, by mystic and splendid visions, the felicity of the soul both here and hereafter, when purified from the defilements of a material nature and constantly elevated to the realities of intellectual [spiritual] vision." According to Plato, "the ultimate design of the Mysteries ... was to lead us back to the principles from which we descended, ... a perfect enjoyment of intellectual [spiritual] good."

The Lesser Mysteries took place in the month of Anthesterion—the eighth month of the Attic calendar, falling in mid-winter around February or March—under the direction of Athens' archon basileus ("king magistrate"). In order to qualify for initiation, participants would sacrifice a piglet to Demeter and Persephone, and then ritually purify themselves in the river Ilisos. Upon completion of the Lesser Mysteries, participants were deemed mystae (initiates) worthy of witnessing the Greater Mysteries.

=== Greater Mysteries ===
For among the many excellent and indeed divine institutions which your Athens has brought forth and contributed to human life, none, in my opinion, is better than those mysteries. For by their means we have been brought out of our barbarous and savage mode of life and educated and refined to a state of civilization; and as the rites are called "initiations," so in very truth we have learned from them the beginnings of life, and have gained the power not only to live happily, but also to die with a better hope.

— Cicero, Laws II, xiv, 36

The Greater Mysteries took place in Boedromion—the third month of the Attic calendar, falling in late summer around September or October—and lasted ten days.

The first act (on the 14th of Boedromion) was the bringing of the sacred objects from Eleusis to the Eleusinion, a temple at the base of the Acropolis of Athens.

On the 15th of Boedromion—a day called the Gathering (Agyrmos)—the priests (hierophantes, those who show the sacred ones) declared the start of the rites (prorrhesis) and carried out the sacrifice (hiereía deúro, hither the victims).

The seawards initiates (halade mystai) started out in Athens on 16th Boedromion, washing themselves in the sea at Phaleron.

On the 17th, the participants began the Epidauria, a festival for Asklepios named after his main sanctuary at Epidauros. This "festival within a festival" celebrated the healer's arrival at Athens with his daughter Hygieia, and consisted of a procession leading to the Eleusinion, during which the mystae apparently stayed at home, performed a great sacrifice, and held an all-night feast (pannykhís).

The procession to Eleusis began at Kerameikos (the Athenian cemetery) on the 18th, from which people walked along the Sacred Way (Ἱερὰ Ὁδός, Hierá Hodós), swinging branches called bacchoi. At a certain spot along the way, they shouted obscenities in commemoration of Iambe (or Baubo), an old woman who, by cracking dirty jokes, had made Demeter smile as she mourned the loss of her daughter. The procession also shouted, "Íakch', O Íakche!"—possibly an epithet for Dionysus, or a separate deity Iacchus, son of Persephone or Demeter.

Upon reaching Eleusis, there was an all-night vigil (pannychis), according to Mylonas and Kerényi, perhaps commemorating Demeter's search for Persephone. At some point, initiates had a special drink (kykeon) of barley and pennyroyal, which has inspired speculation that the drink had psychotropic effects from ergot (a fungus that grows on barley, containing psychedelic alkaloids similar to LSD).

==== Inside the Telesterion ====
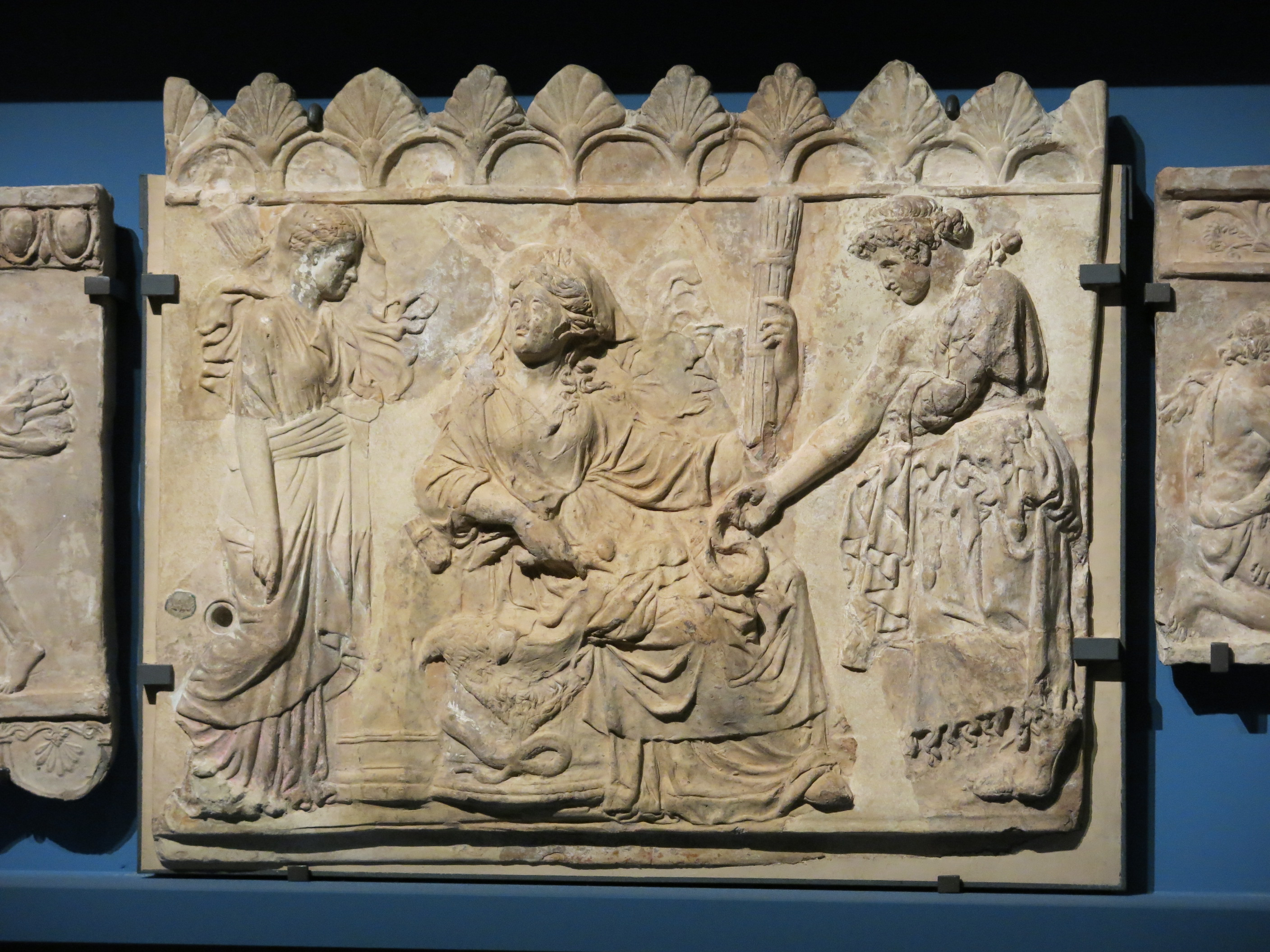
Initiation to Eleusinian Mysteries. c. 100–50 BC; relief, Louvre museum (Paris, France)

On the 19th of Boedromion, initiates entered a great hall called Telesterion. In the center stood the "palace" (Anaktoron), built of ruins dating back to the Mycenaean Age, which only the hierophants could enter, and where sacred objects were stored. Before the mystae could enter the Telesterion, they would recite, "I have fasted, I have drunk the kykeon, I have taken from the kiste (box) and after working it have put it back in the calathus (open basket)."

It is widely supposed that the rites inside the Telesterion comprised three elements:

- dromena (things done)—a dramatic reenactment of the Demeter/Persephone myth
- deiknumena (things shown)—a display of sacred objects, in which the hierophant played an essential role
- legomena (things said)—commentaries that accompanied the deiknumena

Combined, these three elements were known as the aporrheta (unrepeatables); the penalty for divulging them was death. Athenagoras of Athens, Cicero, and other ancient writers cite that it was for this crime (among others) that Diagoras was condemned to death in Athens; the tragic playwright Aeschylus was allegedly tried for revealing secrets of the mysteries in some of his plays, but was acquitted. The ban on divulging the core ritual of the mysteries was thus absolute, which is probably why almost nothing is known about what transpired there.

Climax

As to the climax of the mysteries, there are two modern theories.

Some hold that the priests were the ones to reveal the visions of the holy night, consisting of a fire that represented the possibility of life after death, and various sacred objects. Others hold this explanation to be insufficient to account for the power and longevity of the mysteries, arguing instead that the experiences must have been internal and mediated by a powerful psychoactive ingredient contained in the kykeon drink (see Entheogenic theories below). Although this hypothesis continues to receive attention, it was not well received by classicists.

Following this section of the Mysteries was an all-night feast (Pannychis) accompanied by dancing and merriment. This portion of the festivities was open to the public. The dances took place in the Rarian Field, rumored to be the first spot where grain grew. A bull would also be sacrificed late that night or early the next morning. That day (22nd Boedromion), the initiates honoured the dead by pouring libations from special vessels. The mysteries ended on the 23rd of Boedromion.

== Demise ==
In 170 AD, the Temple of Demeter was sacked by the Sarmatians but was rebuilt by Marcus Aurelius. Aurelius was then allowed to become the only lay person ever to enter the anaktoron. As Christianity gained in popularity in the 4th and 5th centuries, Eleusis's prestige began to fade. The last pagan emperor of Rome, Julian, reigned from 361 to 363 after about fifty years of Christian rule. Julian attempted to restore the Eleusinian Mysteries and was the last emperor to be initiated into them. The closing of the Eleusinian Mysteries in 392 AD by the emperor Theodosius I is reported by Eunapius, a historian and biographer of the Greek philosophers. Eunapius had been initiated by the last legitimate Hierophant, who had been commissioned by the emperor Julian to restore the Mysteries, which had by then fallen into decay. According to Eunapius, the last Hierophant was a usurper, "the man from Thespiae who held the rank of Father in the mysteries of Mithras". According to Eunapius, in 396, during his raiding campaign in Attica, the king of the Goths Alaric I looted the remains of the shrines.

According to historian Hans Kloft, despite the destruction of the Eleusinian Mysteries, elements of the cult survived in the Greek countryside. There, local peasants and shepherds partially transferred Demeter's rites and religious duties onto Saint Demetrius of Thessaloniki, who gradually became the local patron of agriculture and "heir" to the pagan mother goddess.

== In art, literature, and culture ==
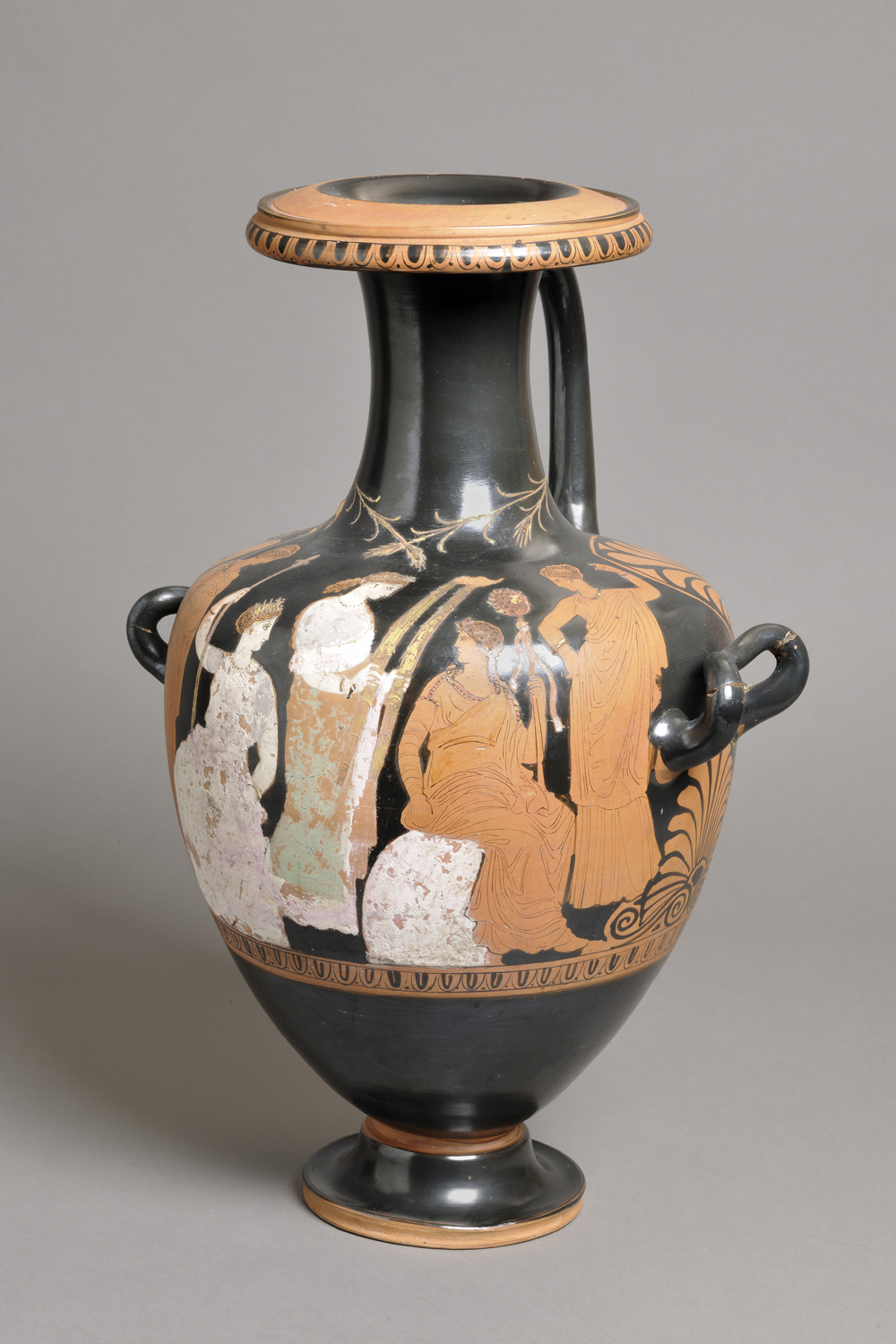
The Eleusinian Mysteries Hydria, showing the reunion of Demeter and Persephone at the start of each spring

There are many paintings and pieces of pottery that depict various aspects of the Mysteries. The Eleusinian Relief, from the late 5th century BC, displayed in the National Archaeological Museum of Athens is a representative example. Triptolemus is depicted receiving seeds from Demeter and teaching mankind how to work the fields to grow crops, with Persephone holding her hand over his head to protect him. Vases and other works of relief sculpture, from the 4th, 5th and 6th centuries BC, depict Triptolemus holding an ear of corn, sitting on a winged throne or chariot, surrounded by Persephone and Demeter with pine torches. The monumental Protoattic amphora from the middle of the 7th century BC, with the depiction of Medusa's beheading by Perseus and the blinding of Polyphemos by Odysseus and his companions on its neck, is kept in the Archaeological Museum of Eleusis which is located inside the archaeological site of Eleusis.

The Ninnion Tablet, found in the same museum, depicts Demeter, followed by Persephone and Iacchus, and then the procession of initiates. Then, Demeter is sitting on the kiste inside the Telesterion, with Persephone holding a torch and introducing the initiates. The initiates each hold a bacchoi. The second row of initiates were led by Iakchos, a priest who held torches for the ceremonies. He is standing near the omphalos while an unknown female (probably a priestess of Demeter) sat nearby on the kiste, holding a scepter and a vessel filled with kykeon. Pannychis is also represented.

The Myth of Er, part of Plato's Republic, is thought to be a representation of the teaching of the Eleusinian Mysteries. Er, after being killed in battle and brought to the underworld, is reincarnated without drinking from the River Lethe. He retains his memories and tells the living about his experience in the underworld. He no longer has a fear of death.

In Shakespeare's Mystery Play: A Study of The Tempest, Colin Still argued that The Tempest was an allegory for initiation into the Eleusinian Mysteries. Though widely rejected, this interpretation was supported by Michael Srigley in Images of Regeneration.

Carl Gustav Jung (1875–1961) borrowed terms and interpretations from the late 19th and early 20th century classical scholarship in German and French as a source of metaphors for his reframing of psychoanalytic treatment into a spiritualistic ritual of initiation and rebirth. The Eleusinian mysteries, particularly the qualities of the Kore, figured prominently in his writings.

Dimitris Lyacos in the second book of the Poena Damni trilogy With the People from the Bridge, a contemporary, avant-garde play focusing on the return of the dead and the revenant legend combines elements from the Eleusinian mysteries as well as early Christian tradition in order to convey a view of collective salvation. The text uses the pomegranate symbol in order to hint at the residence of the dead in the underworld and their periodical return to the world of the living.

Octavio Vazquez's symphonic poem Eleusis draws on the Eleusinian Mysteries and on other Western esoteric traditions. Commissioned by the Sociedad General de Autores y Editores and the RTVE Symphony Orchestra, it was premiered in 2015 by the RTVE Orchestra and conductor Adrian Leaper at the Teatro Monumental in Madrid.

== Entheogenic theories ==
Numerous scholars have proposed that the power of the Eleusinian Mysteries came from the kykeon's functioning as an entheogen, or psychedelic agent. The use of potions or philtres for magical or religious purposes was relatively common in Greece and the ancient world. The initiates, sensitized by their fast and prepared by preceding ceremonies (see set and setting), may have been propelled by the effects of a powerful psychoactive potion into revelatory mind states with profound spiritual and intellectual ramifications. In opposition to this idea, skeptical scholars note the lack of any solid evidence and stress the collective rather than individual character of initiation into the Mysteries.

Many psychoactive agents have been proposed as the significant element of kykeon, though without consensus or conclusive evidence. These include the ergot species Claviceps paspali, a fungal parasite of paspalum, which contains the alkaloids ergotamine, a precursor to LSD, and ergonovine. However, modern attempts to prepare a kykeon using ergot-parasitized barley have yielded inconclusive results, though Alexander Shulgin and Ann Shulgin describe ergonovine and LSA to be known to produce LSD-like effects.

Discovery of fragments of ergot (fungi containing LSD-like psychedelic alkaloids) in a temple dedicated to the two Eleusinian Goddesses excavated at the Mas Castellar site (Girona, Spain) provided some legitimacy for this theory. Ergot fragments were found inside a vase and within the dental calculus of a 25-year-old man, providing evidence of ergot being consumed. This finding seems to support the hypothesis of ergot as an ingredient of the Eleusinian kykeon.

Psychoactive mushrooms are another candidate. Scholars such as Robert Graves and Terence McKenna, speculated that the mysteries were focused around a variety of Psilocybe. Other entheogenic fungi, such as Amanita muscaria, have also been suggested. A recent hypothesis suggests that the ancient Egyptians cultivated Psilocybe cubensis on barley and associated it with the deity Osiris.

Another candidate for the psychoactive drug is an opioid derived from the poppy. The cult of the goddess Demeter may have brought the poppy from Crete to Eleusis; it is certain that opium was produced in Crete.

Another theory is that the psychoactive agent in kykeon is DMT, which occurs in many wild plants of the Mediterranean, including Phalaris and/or Acacia. To be active orally (like in ayahuasca) it must be combined with a monoamine oxidase inhibitor such as Syrian rue (Peganum harmala), which grows throughout the Mediterranean.

Alternatively, J. Nigro Sansonese (1994), using the mythography supplied by Mylonas, hypothesizes that the Mysteries of Eleusis were a series of practical initiations into trance involving proprioception of the human nervous system induced by breath control (similar to samyama in yoga). Sansonese speculates that the kisté, a box holding sacred objects opened by the hierophant, is actually an esoteric reference to the initiate's skull, within which is seen a sacred light and are heard sacred sounds, but only after instruction in trance practice. Similarly, the seed-filled chambers of a pomegranate, a fruit associated with the founding of the cult, esoterically describe proprioception of the initiate's heart during trance.

== Notable participants ==
- Aeschylus (525/524–456/455 BC)
- Plato (428/427 or 424/423–348/347 BC)
- Augustus (63 BC–AD 14)
- Plutarch (c. AD 46–after 119)
- Hadrian (76–138)
- Antinous (c. 111–130)
- Marcus Aurelius (121–180)
- Commodus (161–192)
- Gallienus (c. 218–268)
- Julian (331–363)
- Sophocles
- Cicero

== See also ==
- Greco-Roman mysteries
- Cabeiri
- Caryatids of Eleusis
- Lacrateides Relief
- Christian persecution of paganism under Theodosius I
- Dionysian Mysteries
- Kykeon
- Mycenaean Greece
- Orphism
- Poppy goddess
- Sacerdos Cereris

== Bibliography ==
- Boardman, Griffin, and Murray. The Oxford History of the Classical World (Oxford University Press 1986). ISBN 978-0-19-872112-3.
- Bowden, Hugh. Mystery Cults of the Ancient World (Princeton University Press; 2010)
- Bizzotto, Jacopo. "The hypothesis on the presence of entheogens in the Eleusinian mysteries." Medicina Historica 2.2 (2018): 85–93.
- Brisson, Luc and Tihanyi, Catherine, 2004. How Philosophers Saved Myths: Allegorical Interpretation and Classical Mythology. University of Chicago Press. ISBN 0-226-07535-4
- Burkert, Walter, Ancient Mystery Cults, Harvard University Press, 1987.
- Clinton, Kevin (1974). "The Sacred Officials of the Eleusinian Mysteries". Transactions of the American Philosophical Society. 64 (3): 1–143. doi:10.2307/1006226. ISSN 0065-9746. JSTOR 1006226.
- Clinton, Kevin (1988). "Sacrifice at the Eleusinian Mysteries". In Hägg, R.; Marinatos, N. (eds.). Early Greek Cult Practice. Stockholm. pp. 69–79.
- Clinton, Kevin. "The Epidauria and the Arrival of Asclepius in Athens" in Ancient Greek Cult Practice from the Epigraphical Evidence. edited by R. Hägg, Stockholm, 1994. ISBN 91-7916-029-8.
- Clinton, Kevin (1995). "The sanctuary of Demeter and Kore at Eleusis". Greek sanctuaries : new approaches. London: Routledge. ISBN 978-0203432709.
- Clinton, Kevin (2004). "Epiphany in the Eleusinian Mysteries". Illinois Classical Studies. 29: 85–109. ISSN 0363-1923. JSTOR 23065342.
- Clinton, Kevin (2005). Eleusis, the Inscriptions on Stone: Documents of the Sanctuary of the Two Goddesses and Public Documents of the Deme. Archaeological Society at Athens. ISBN 978-960-8145-46-7.
- Clinton, Kevin (2019). "Journeys to the Eleusinian Mysteria (with an Appendix on the Procession at the Andanian Mysteria)". In Friese, W.; Handberg, S.; Kristensen, T.M. (eds.). Ascending and Descending the Acropolis. Movement in Athenian Religion. Athens. pp. 161–177.
- Cosmopoulos, Michael (2015). Bronze Age Eleusis and the Origins of the Eleusinian Mysteries. Cambridge University Press. ISBN 978-1-316-36823-7.
- Greene, William C. "The Return of Persephone" in Classical Philology. University of Chicago Press, 1946. pp. 105–106.
- Kerényi, Karl. Eleusis: Archetypal Image of Mother and Daughter, Bollingen Foundation, 1967. ISBN 0-691-01915-0.
- Metzner, Ralph. "The Reunification of the Sacred and the natural", Eleusis Volume VIII, pp. 3–13 (1997).
- Kloft, Hans (2010). Mysterienkulte der Antike. Götter, Menschen, Rituale (in German). Munich: C.H. Beck. ISBN 978-3-406-44606-1.
- McKenna, Terence. Food of the Gods: Search for the Original Tree of Knowledge. Bantam, 1993. ISBN 0-553-37130-4.
- Meyer, Marvin W. (1999). The Ancient Mysteries, a Sourcebook: Sacred Texts of the Mystery Religions of the Ancient Mediterranean World. University of Pennsylvania Press. ISBN 0-8122-1692-X
- Moore, Clifford H. Religious Thought of the Greeks. (1916). Kessinger Publishing, 2003. ISBN 0-7661-5130-1.
- Mylonas, George Emmanuel. Eleusis and the Eleusinian Mysteries. Princeton University Press, 1961.
- Muraresku, Brian C. The Immortality Key: The Secret History of the Religion with No Name. Macmillan, 2020. ISBN 978-1250207142
- Nilsson, Martin P. Greek Popular Religion 1940.
- Parker, Robert (2005). "Eleusinian Festivals". Polytheism and society at Athens. Oxford: Oxford University Press. pp. 327–368. ISBN 978-0191534522.
- Rosen, Ralph M. "Hipponax fr. 48 DG. and the Eleusinian Kykeon." The American Journal of Philology 108.3 (1987): 416–426.
- Sansonese, J. Nigro. The Body of Myth. Rochester, VT: Inner Traditions, 1994. ISBN 0-89281-409-8.
- Shulgin, Alexander, Ann Shulgin. TiHKAL. Transform Press, 1997.
- Smith, William, A New Classical Dictionary of Greek and Roman Biography, Mythology and Geography Vol. II. Kessinger Publishing, LLC, 2006. ISBN 1-4286-4561-6.
- Smith, William. A Dictionary of Greek and Roman Antiquities. London, 1875.
- Tonelli, Angelo. Eleusis e Orfismo. I Misteri e la tradizione iniziatica greca. Feltrinelli, 2015. ISBN 978-8807901645
- Tripolitis, Antonia. Religions of the Hellenistic-Roman Age. Wm. B. Eerdmans Publishing Company, 2001. ISBN 0-8028-4913-X.
- Wasson, R, Ruck, C., Hofmann, A., The Road to Eleusis: Unveiling the Secret of the Mysteries. Harcourt, Brace, Jovanovich, 1978. ISBN 0-15-177872-8.
- Virgili, Antonio. "Culti misterici ed orientali a Pompei". Roma. Gangemi, 2008
- Willoughby, Harold R. (1929). "The Greater Mysteries at Eleusis". Pagan Regeneration: A Study of Mystery Initiations in the Graeco-Roman World. Chicago: University of Chicago Press.
