= J. Nigro Sansonese =

American dramatist

J. Nigro Sansonese is the pen name of author Joseph Sansonese (born May 13, 1946).

== Biography ==
J. Nigro Sansonese was born Joseph Sansonese in Buffalo, NY, where he attended Canisius High School. He was trained in physics and mathematics at Fordham University (Sc.B 1968) (Bronx, NY) and Brown University (Providence, RI). In 1996–97, he taught a course in the history of science at Stonehill College (Easton, MA) and from 2001 to 2009 courses in mathematics and science on St. Croix at the University of the Virgin Islands (Kingshill, VI). Over the course of 30 years he also taught mathematics and science at various high schools, public and private, in the United States and its territories. He retired from teaching in 2012.

His main published work is The Body of Myth: Mythology, Shamanic Trance, and the Sacred Geography of the Body, ISBN 0-89281-409-8, a nonfiction work of some 400 pages on the relationship between mythology and human biology, that appeared in 1994.

He was co-screenwriter of Hurricane Festival, a 1997 feature film, with Chi Y. Lee. His plays include The House on the Point, produced at the Hult Center for the Performing Arts, Eugene, OR, November 1985, and The Mill at Tour d'Ivoire, read at the Interstate Firehouse Cultural Center, North Portland, OR, September 1984, and the Greene Street Theater, New York City, April 1986.

== Works ==
In addition to his work in print Sansonese has discussed his theory of mythopoesis (Gk., "story making") in a lengthy 1994 video interview with San Francisco psychologist Jeffrey Mishlove of the series Thinking Allowed (PBS).

Nigro Sansonese's mythology, elaborated in The Body of Myth: Mythology, Shamanic Trance, and the Sacred Geography of the Body (1994), might be summarized as follows: Early myth-making (before, say, 5000 BC) among archaic peoples—especially but not exclusively Indo-European speakers—may have originated in an esoteric oral cephelosophy or "skull wisdom" automatically imparted, primarily to young men at the age of puberty, in secret initiation rituals, during which venerated ancestral skulls might have been displayed for purposes of illustrating the meaning of particular myths. Recent excavations at Göbekli Tepe in southeastern Turkey, the oldest known site of religious architecture in the world (c. 10,000 BC), have revealed that a skull cult may indeed have been centered there for nearly 2000 years.

The aboriginal inspiration for myth, Sansonese argues, lay in heightened awareness (see proprioception) of certain internal bodily activities important in religiously oriented meditation. The means of heightening proprioception are closely guarded meditative techniques orally communicated from teacher (adept) to student, in particular but not exclusively, techniques associated with respiration.

Subject to numerous cultural contingencies, the techniques likely first appeared in history many thousands of years ago in the trance-inducing practices of shamans and became more systematized, refined, and elaborate over millennia. Because the activities attended to in many meditative traditions, for example, respiration and heart rate, are physiologically fundamental to all human bodies everywhere, an explicit argument of the book is that a proprioceptive interpretation probably applies to all mythologies that are sufficiently archaic in origin, which he defines as no later than approximately 800 BC. About a quarter of the book focuses on interpreting the biblical narratives of Judaism and Christianity.

A myth, then, according to Sansonese is a veiled, culturally conditioned description of a trance-inducing technique and resulting proprioceptions. Myths, therefore, on this view are (very) early attempts at articulating what, in 1945, Aldous Huxley called perennial philosophy, and are simultaneously mystical and practical in their origins.

Much of the practical aim of a myth is instruction in what Sansonese calls "the art of dying," a narrative prefiguring of the literal experience of somatic death, which is a matter of the practical mastery of a critical, unpredictable, and irreversible endocrinal event that he suggestively describes as a "pituitary catastrophe," in the sense that the pituitary gland initiates it. In Nigro Sansonese's view, death is an event triggered by the endocrine system. In sum, Nigro Sansonese defines an "authentic myth" as "an esoteric description of a heightened proprioception," meaning a verbal description, albeit a necessarily imperfect one, of a literal experience undergone by an adept while in a trance state, which, very critically, must be distinguished from mere symbolism or metaphor. Understanding religious practice (praxis) eclipses understanding religious belief (dogma) in its importance for understanding both the origin and the meaning of a specific myth of sufficient antiquity (see also his lengthy discussion of the Eleusinian Mysteries).

In deep meditation, the region of the cranial sinciput, or forehead, is in emphasis, particularly the glabella, a fissure between the brows esoterically described in myth, Sansonese claims, as a portal or entry such as the Scæan Gate into Troy (see Book VI of The Iliad and passim) or the Hellespont on the way to Colchis, mythic locale of the Golden Fleece, to give just two of numerous examples cited. Another vivid illustration is the mythical figure Sisyphus (Ancient Greek: Σίσυφος, Sísyphos), king of Corinth, whose myths Sansonese explores in detail, and whose name, he suggests, is literally an onomatopoetic rendering of the sussurant sound ("siss phuss") the moving breath makes in the nostrils, the breath of course being an important object of meditative concentration (a bija in yoga). Repetitive inhalations–exhalations are described esoterically in the myth as an up–down motion of Sisyphus and a boulder on a hill.

Various animals, particularly strenuous breathers such as horses, swine, and asses, describe respiration in myth. The descriptive principle is widely distributed geographically. For example, Jesus' entry into Jerusalem while riding on an ass' colt is a Semitic myth equivalent to Odysseus' entry into Troy inside a horse.

As a compendium Sansonese provides five axioms to guide the interpretation of archaic mythopoesis. A critical contention of the book is that myths are not so much symbols natural to human ideation, as Carl Jung proposed in 1933, as they are culture-specific, esoteric descriptions of somatic activity proprioceived during exalted trance states, for example, those attained through, but not limited to, yoga (see also samyama and pranayama).

Nigro Sansonese's work also has relevance to the scientific study of consciousness, specifically, by proposing that an implicit epistemology—namely, a description of knowledge that is in its nature, i.e., essentially, a priori, also known as consciousness—unavoidably orders the fundamental laws of physics differentially, from the (macroscopically) perceived and proprioceived 17th-century mechanics of Isaac Newton to the indispensability of mathematics in the 20th-century quantum mechanics of Werner Heisenberg. That historical development is interpreted by Sansonese as one of successively elaborating a physics originally based on empirical knowledge obtained via proprioception and perception into a physics that is a conformal map onto the psychodynamics of cognition. A succinct summary of that assertion would be "Ontology is epistemology: Every state of being is ipso facto a state of knowing." On such a view, quantum mechanics arguably might be said to be more "meta-physics" than physics.

Finally, Sansonese implies that the physics of the universe is fundamentally that of a particular and well-known harmonic oscillator known as a critically damped tank circuit at or near resonance (sometimes called an LC circuit), providing as well a multi-dimensional "experience space" in which that hypothesis may be investigated mathematically. One conclusion might then be that a tank-circuit universe is probably a hologrammatic Anti-de Sitter space.
