= Philon =

4th-century BC Greek architect

Philon (Greek: Φίλων), Athenian architect of the 4th century BC, is known as the planner of two important works: the portico of twelve Doric columns to the great Hall of the Mysteries at Eleusis (work commissioned by Demetrius of Phalerum about 318 BC) and, under the administration of Lycurgus, an arsenal in Piraeus, Athens' port city. Of the last we have exact knowledge from an inscription. E. A. Gardner observes that it "is perhaps known to us more in detail than any other lost monument of antiquity." It was to hold the rigging of the galleys; and was so contrived that all its contents were visible from a central hall, and so liable to the inspection of the Athenian democracy. He is known to have written books on the Athenian arsenal and on the proportions of temple buildings, but these are now lost.

Vitruvius (vii, introduction) quotes Philon on the proportions of temples, and on the naval arsenal which was at the port of Piraeus.

Philon's arsenal was destroyed by the forces of Lucius Cornelius Sulla in the Roman conquest of Athens in 86 BC.
