= Telesterion =

Great hall and sanctuary in Greece associated with the Eleusinian Mysteries

Coordinates: 38.0408°N 23.5386°E

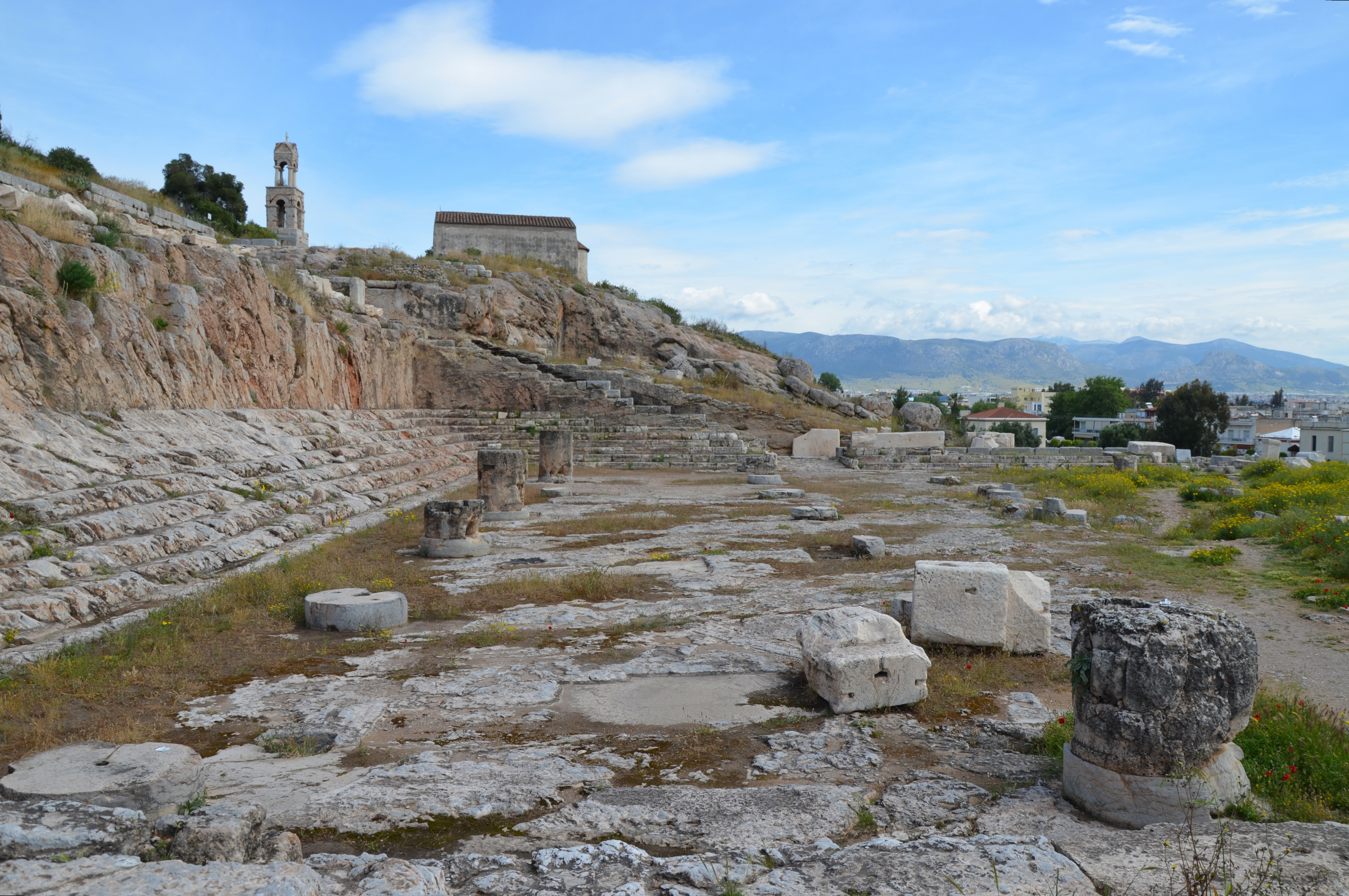
General view of the site of the Telesterion in Eleusis

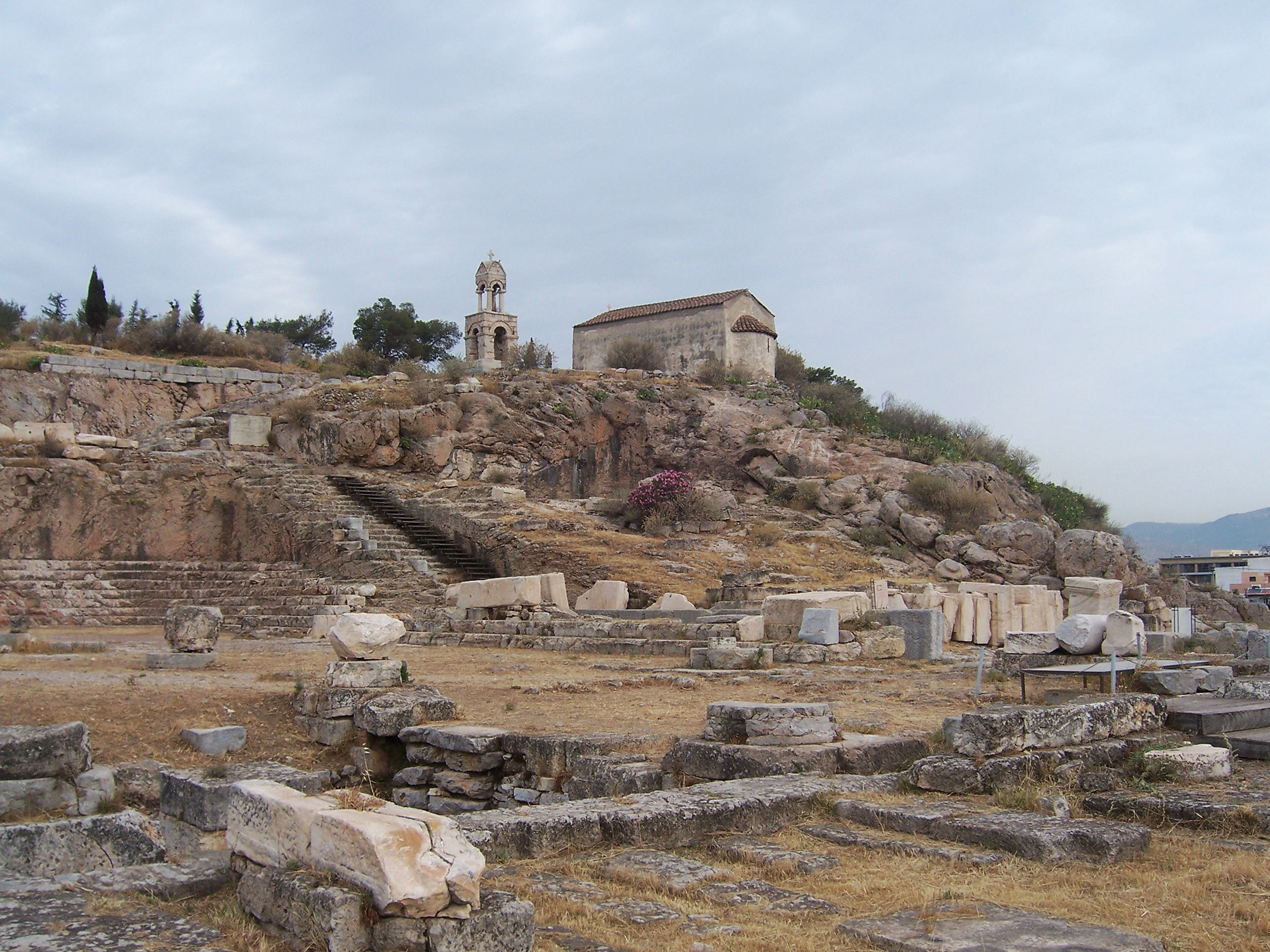
Another View of Telesterion (Initiation Hall), Center for the Eleusinian Mysteries, Eleusis

The Telesterion ("Initiation Hall" from Gr. τελείω, "to complete, to fulfill, to consecrate, to initiate") was a great hall and sanctuary in Eleusis, one of the primary centers of the Eleusinian Mysteries. The hall had a fifty-five yard square roof that could cover three-thousand people, but no one revealed what happened during these events beyond there being "something done, something said, and something shown". This building was built in the 7th century BCE and was an important site until it was destroyed in the 4th century CE. Devoted to Demeter and Persephone, these initiation ceremonies were the most sacred and ancient of all the religious rites celebrated in Greece.

== History ==
It is disputed when the site of the Telesterion is believed to have been originally built. There is evidence to suggest that the temple was created in the 7th century BCE, but historians know that it was created at least by the time of the Homeric Hymn to Demeter (650–550 BCE). The construction of Telesterion took place in ten different phases.

It was destroyed by the Persians after the Battle of Thermopylae, when the Athenians withdrew to Salamis in 480 BCE and all of Boeotia and Attica fell to the Persian army, who captured and burnt Athens. After the defeat of the Persians, the Telesterion was intended to be reconstructed by Kimon, but it was instead rebuilt some time later due to Pericles' influence.

At some point in the 5th century BCE, Iktinos, the great architect of the Parthenon, built the Telesterion big enough to hold thousands of people. Other architects who worked on the Telesterion were Coroebus and Metagenes of Athens. In about 318 BCE, Philon added a portico with twelve Doric columns.

The Telesterion continued to see use throughout the Roman period. In 170 CE, during the rule of Roman emperor Marcus Aurelius, an ancient tribe called the Costoboci launched an invasion of Roman territory south of the Danube, entering Thracia and ravaging the provinces of Macedonia and Achaea (Greece). The Costoboci reached as far south as Eleusis, where they destroyed the Telesterion. The emperor responded by dispatching general Vehilius Gratus Iulianus to Greece with emergency reinforcements, who eventually defeated the Costoboci. Marcus Aurelius then had the Telesterion rebuilt bigger than it had been before. Then only a few hundred years later in 396 CE, the forces of Alaric the Visigoth invaded the Eastern Roman Empire and ravaged Attica, destroying the Telesterion, which was never to be rebuilt.

=== Religious use ===
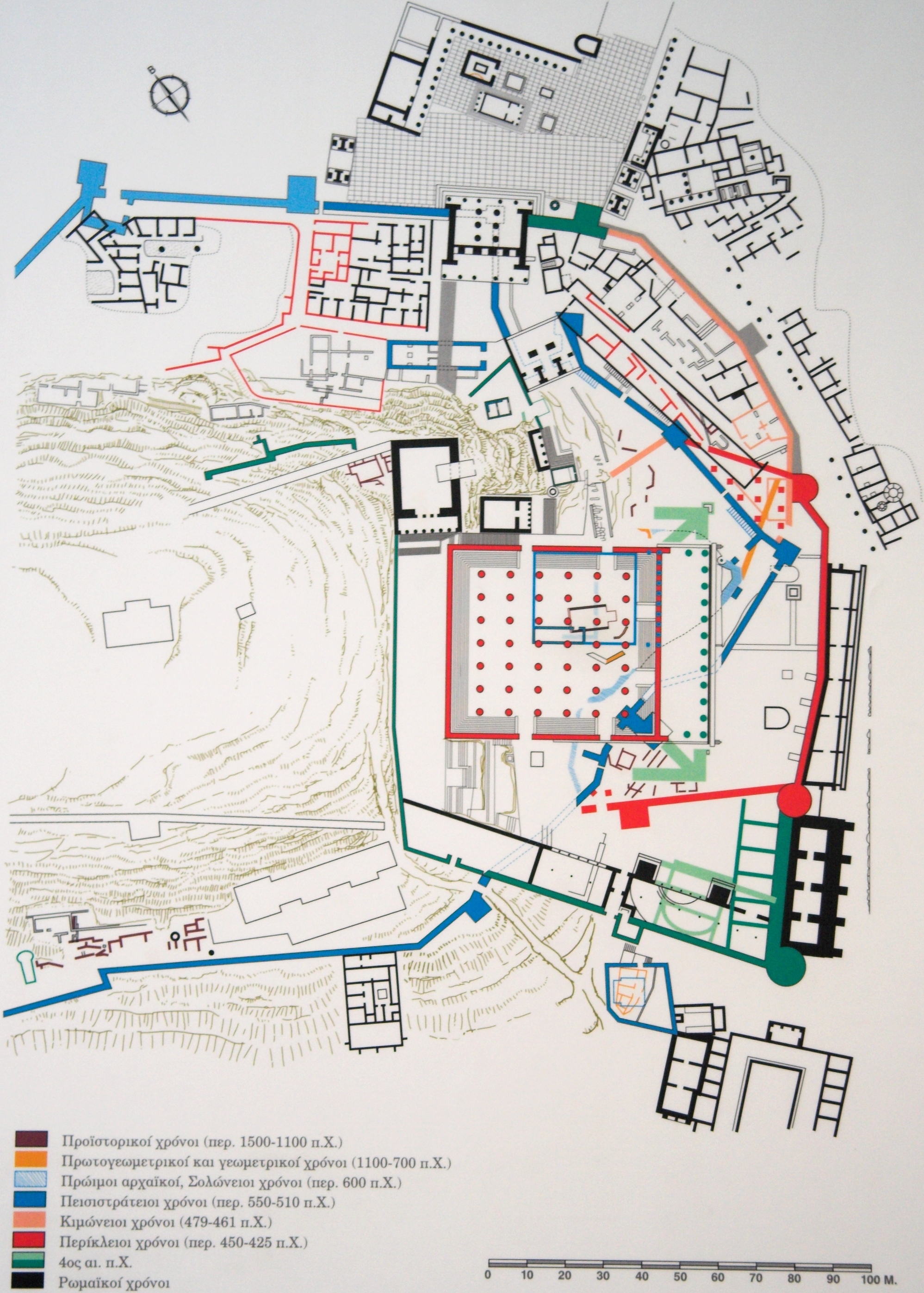
Plan of Eleusis

The Athenians used several calendars, each for different purposes. The festival of Eleusinia was celebrated each year in Eleusis and Athens for nine days from the 15th to the 23rd of the month of Boedromion (in September or October of the Gregorian calendar); because the festival calendar had 12 lunar months, the celebrations were not strictly calibrated to a year of 365 days. During the festival, Athens was crowded with visitors. At the climax of the ceremonies at Eleusis, the initiates entered the Telesterion where they were shown the sacred relics of Demeter and the priestesses revealed their visions of the holy night (probably a fire that represented the possibility of life after death). This was the most secretive part of the Mysteries and those who had been initiated were forbidden to ever speak of the events that took place in the Telesterion.

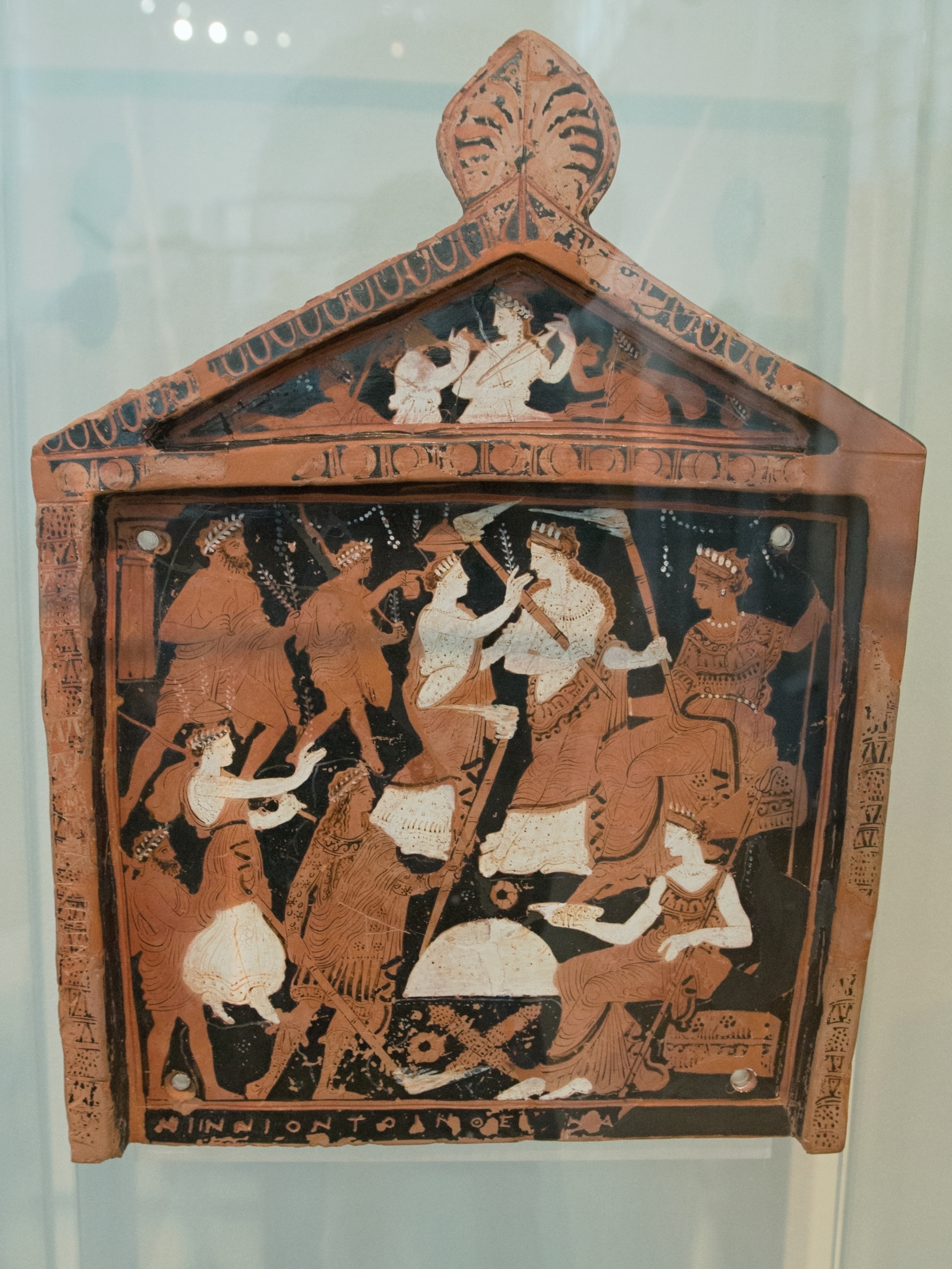
Terracotta Votive Plaque From Eleusis, 450 BCE (NAMA)

The origin of the ritual of the Eleusinia is from the myth of Persephone being abducted by Hades to the underworld, while her mother Demeter frantically seeks her in the mortal world. After she learns that Zeus allowed the kidnapping to happen, she turns herself into an old woman and wanders the world until she reaches Eleusis, where she is taken in by the King's daughters. She is overcome with grief, but is given Queen Metanira's latest born child, Demophoon to nurse. He grows more than any other child, but his mother is afraid when he is put over a flame before he can be made fully immortal. Demeter gets angry, and tells her that since she robbed her son of immortality and angered her, the people of Eleusis must create a temple to her where they would do things to gain back her favor. Even after Demeter got her daughter back from Hades for part of the year, the Eleusinian Mysteries continued.

It was said in myth that Herakles partook in the Eleusian Mysteries as part of the Labours of Hercules' twelfth labor in which he captured Cerberus, and during which he saw visions of both Persephone and Demeter.

Some temple use ceased during the persecution of pagans in the late Roman Empire, when all non-Christian sanctuaries were ordered closed by laws initiated by the Christian emperors. However, it was not until the anti-pagan decree of Theodosius in around 390 CE that there was an end to all religious use of the temple.

== Architecture of the Telesterion ==
=== Architectural development ===
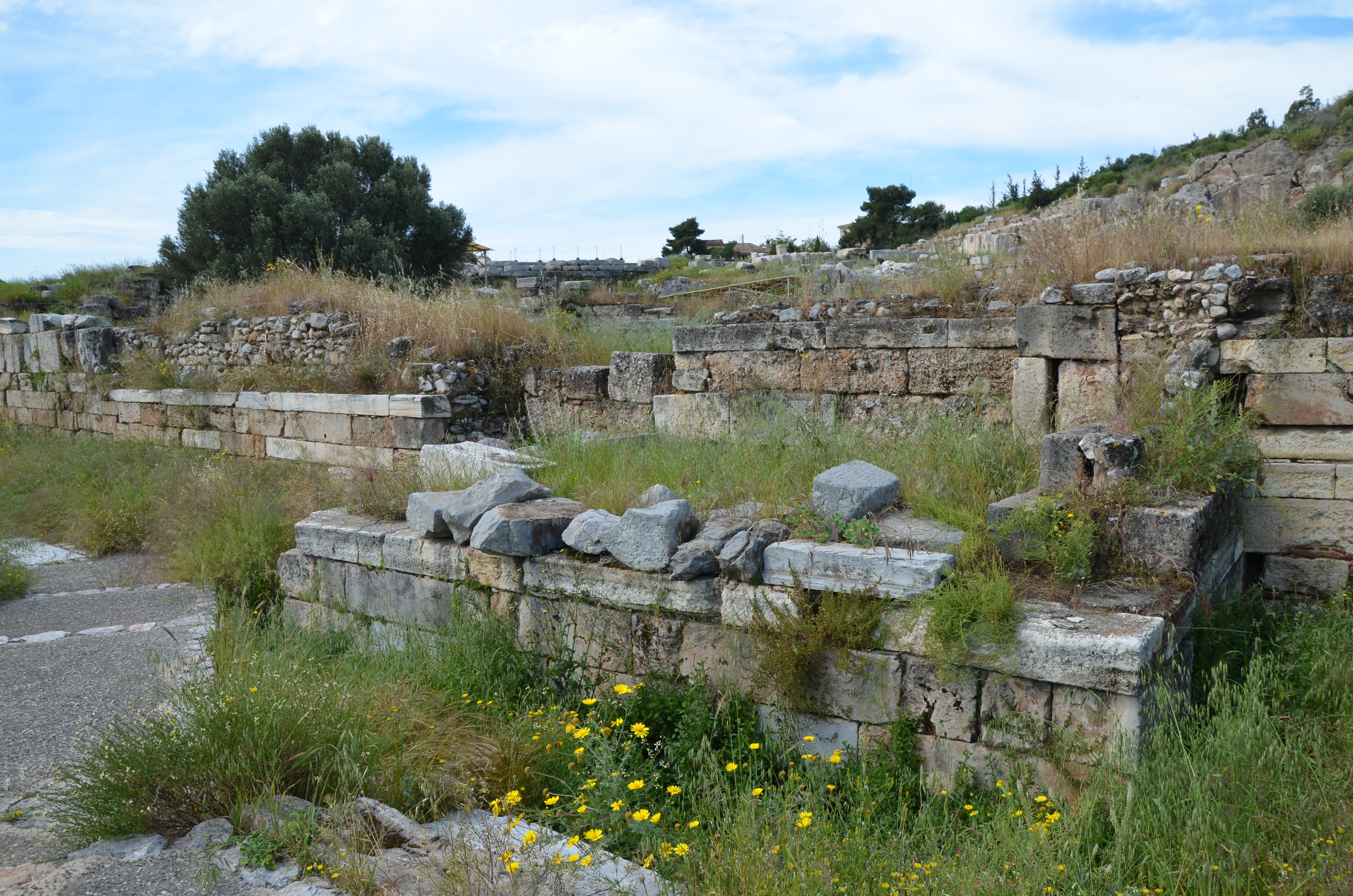
View of Eleusis

During the mid-fifth century BCE, the Telesterion at Eleusis remained in ruins following its destruction by Persian invaders a generation earlier. Visitors at the time would have observed both residual damage and partial repairs. Although the mud-brick wall had been breached by Persian battering rams, it had since been patched. A new section was also added to the northeast, designated for sanctuary-related functions.

Between 478 and 450 BCE, the central terrace remained largely unchanged. At the time of the Persian attack, the sanctuary had been undergoing reconstruction; the archaic Telesterion had already been dismantled and a new version was only in the early stages of construction. As a result, the Telesterion was left unfinished and deteriorated for several decades.

Unlike typical Greek temples, the Telesterion, while serving as the central sacred space of the Eleusinian Mysteries, was architecturally more similar to a performance hall than to structures like the Parthenon. The term “Telesterion,” commonly used today, derives from Plutarch, though it was rarely used in antiquity. In official fifth-century inscriptions, the structure was referred to as the “Eleusinion.”

Among the religious cults affected by the Persian sack of Attica, the cult of Demeter at Eleusis was likely the most disrupted, given its heavy dependence on rituals conducted inside the sanctuary. The Mysteries relied on indoor ceremonies, including the secret initiation rites during which the hierophant revealed sacred objects of the cult. These were housed in a special inner chamber known as the Anaktoron, the most sacred space of the temple. Due to the centrality of this site, it is likely that a temporary structure was erected on the ruins of the original Telesterion. This would have been a light construction, leaving no surviving physical remains. Archaeological evidence suggests that this makeshift building was located on the northeastern half of the site. When large-scale construction resumed under Pericles, it began on the southwestern side, behind the Anaktoron, an area previously left untouched.

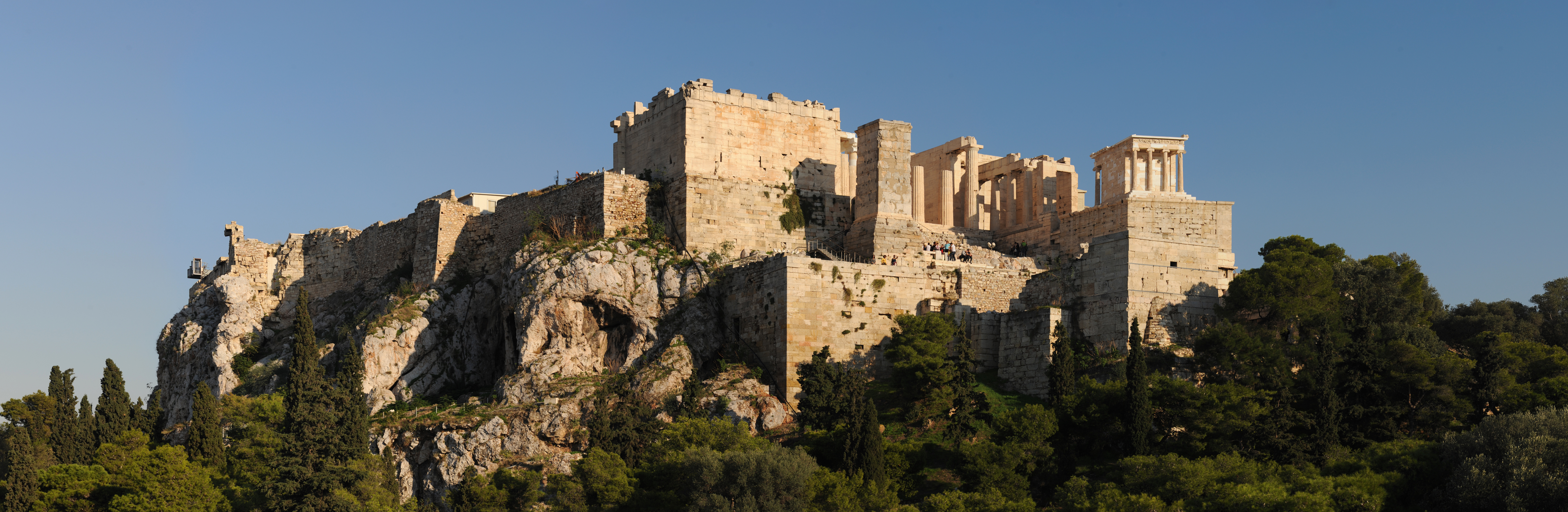
View of the Athenian Acropolis

Before the mid-fifth century BCE, the Eleusinian sanctuary was in a poor state. It may not have even had a secure space to protect its sacred treasury. Instead, the funds dedicated to Demeter and Persephone were stored on the Athenian Acropolis alongside the treasury of Athena, indicating that Eleusis lacked a safe depository of its own.

This situation began to change when Athens, as part of its broader Panhellenic ambitions, promoted the Eleusinian Mysteries as a unifying religious institution. Plans likely emerged to rebuild and expand the Telesterion. The first concrete step came with a decree proposed by a man named Thespieus, which reorganized the administration of the sanctuary. The decree established a board of five supervisors, known as epistatai, one of whom would serve as secretary. These officials were tasked with managing all financial and property matters concerning Demeter and Persephone, not only in Eleusis, but also in shrines located in Athens and the port of Phaleron.

The epistatai were empowered to collect outstanding debts, recover lost property, and manage the goddesses’ income, in consultation with the priests and the Athenian council (boulē). After the new board was formed, a state audit was conducted to examine financial records from the sanctuaries in Eleusis, Athens, and Phaleron. No architects were consulted regarding the Eleusinian sanctuary during this audit, suggesting that no major building projects had yet begun at Eleusis. Nonetheless, the scale of the administrative reorganization suggests that large-scale construction, namely, the rebuilding of the Telesterion, was imminent.

Thespieus’s amendment likely supplemented an earlier, now-lost decree that had authorized the Telesterion’s reconstruction. He granted the epistatai significant authority and access to financial resources to carry out the project. The epistatai became the long-term administrators of the sanctuary, holding this role for over a century. Although they were initially appointed annually, their terms and numbers varied over time, which was typical for Athenian civic offices. Despite such changes, they retained their original responsibilities, which included financial oversight, supervision of construction, and maintenance of detailed records.

Surviving inscriptions from their archives include inventories of sacred objects, grain offerings, and contracts related to building activities. The epistatai were responsible for hiring architects, paying workers, and publishing accounts of construction expenses. These projects included new walls, gates, and entrances, especially those associated with the Telesterion. Ultimately, the epistatai served as the key officials responsible for the successful rebuilding of the Telesterion in the classical period.

=== Influence of acoustics on the ritual experience ===
The Telesterion was a square, pillared, and spacious hall with seating arranged in eight rows, similar to an amphitheater, and it could accommodate up to 5,000 people. It featured six hallways leading to six separate entrances. The building resembled a theater, though without a stage, and had the Anaktoron, the most sacred chamber, at its center. Adjacent to it stood the marble throne of the Hierophant, the chief priest of the Mysteries.

Sound propagation within large architectural spaces faces several challenges. First, sound weakens as it travels over distance. Second, sound energy diffuses in multiple directions, causing reverberation. Third, tall spaces can produce echoes. Fourth, spacious and empty interiors lack sound-absorbing surfaces, which can diminish clarity. The Telesterion overcame these obstacles through thoughtful architectural choices and materials. Its walls were constructed with resonant stone, allowing for a bold, amplified sound. The walls of the Anaktoron also reflected and reinforced sound between speakers and their audience. The interior columns enhanced echo effects, while the stepped seating contributed to sound reflection back into the space. The roof, made of wood, a naturally sound-absorbing material, reflected only part of the sound energy, helping modulate the acoustics further.

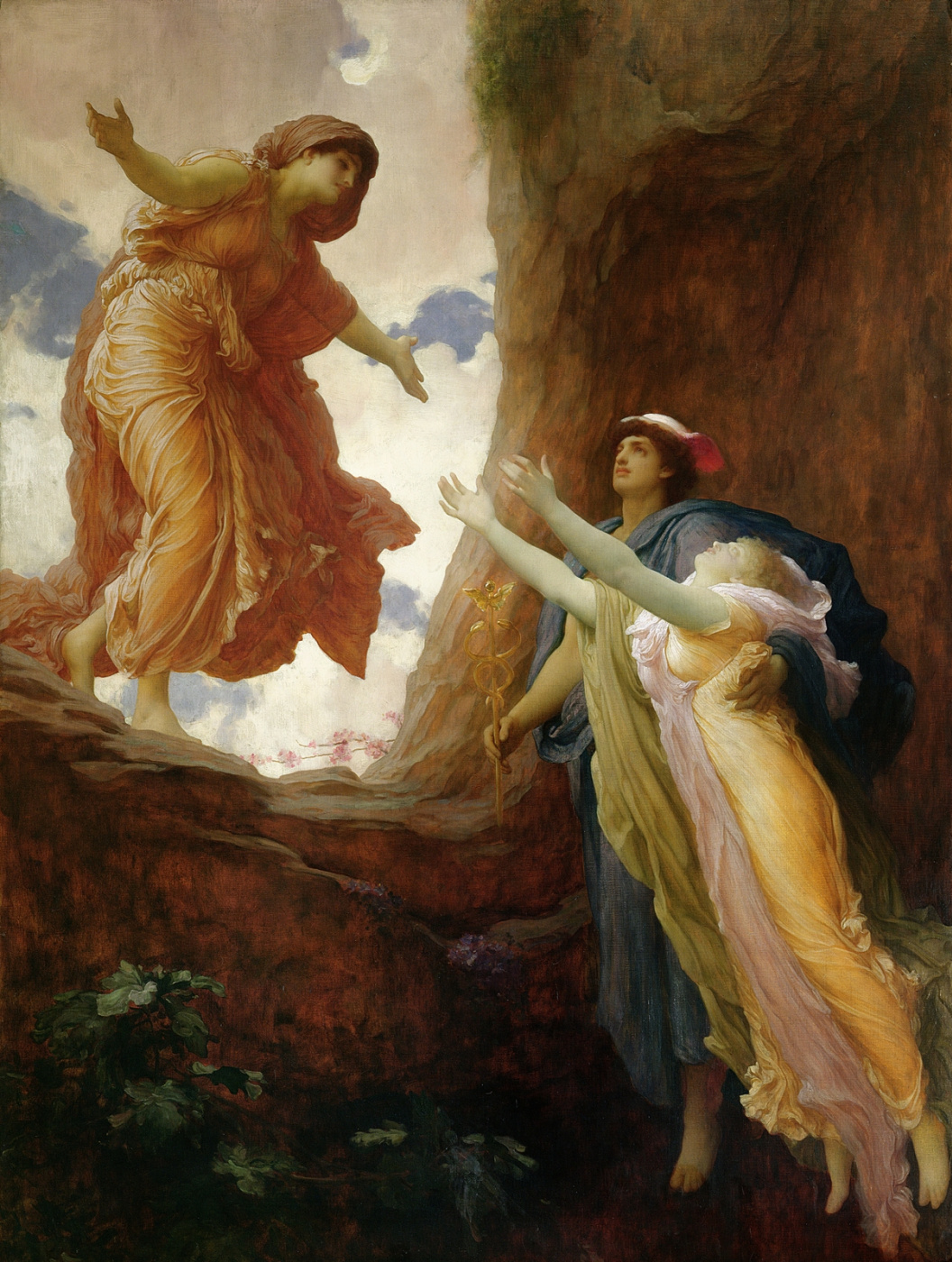
Frederic Leighton The Return of Persephone (1891)

Additionally, heat from torchlight affected how sound traveled. Heat produces layers of air with differing densities, which in turn alter the reflection and refraction of sound waves. These combined physical effects produced an acoustically dynamic and unstable auditory experience, intensifying the emotional impact of ritual proceedings.

Sound was central to this experience. The fear of the underworld was simulated through darkness and eerie sounds, including a metal drum that may have mimicked the wailing of Persephone during her abduction, or the echo of Demeter’s call across land and sea. The performance concluded with chants, the raising of torches, and finally, a moment of profound silence as the priest revealed a wheat ear, regarded as Demeter’s most sacred gift.

All of these physical dynamics contributed to a complex and immersive auditory experience that heightened the emotional impact on the initiates. Throughout all three phases of the ceremonies, instrumental sounds were used to produce unnatural effects that amplified the mystical atmosphere. These sounds helped create the impression that otherworldly entities were present during the rituals.

=== Sensory framing of the deiknymena ===
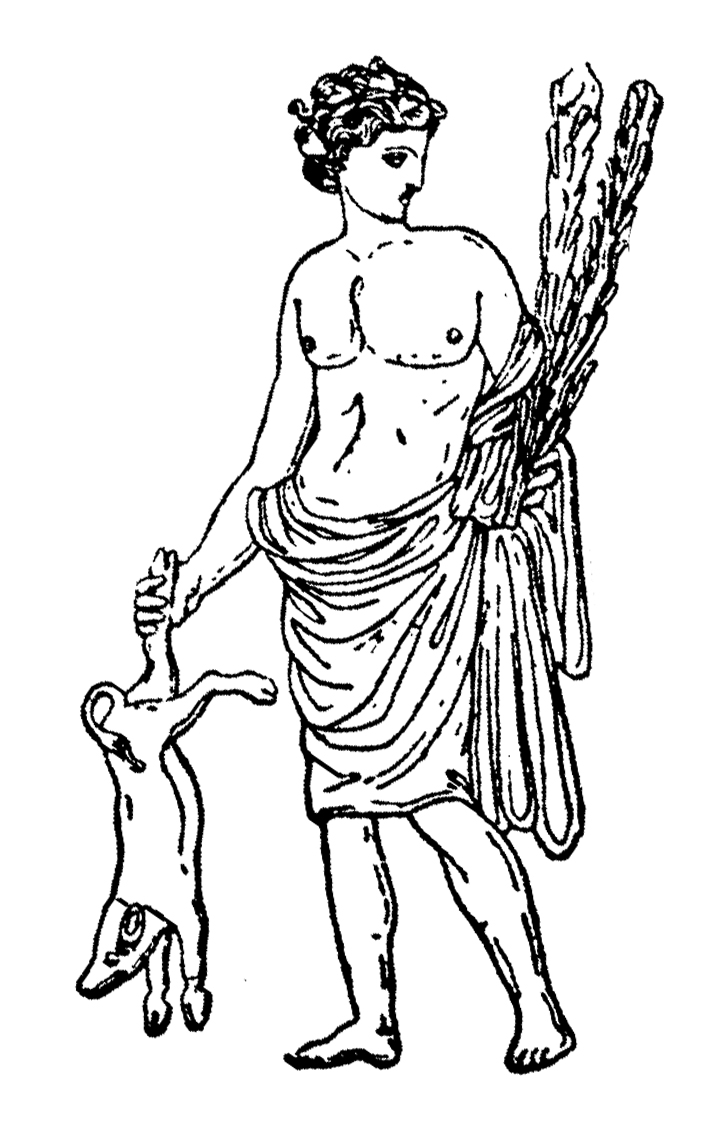
Drawing of Elusinian Priest

The walls and roof of the Telesterion created a visually enclosed and darkened environment that shaped the sensory experience of the initiates during the Deiknymena. During this ritual, sacred objects were presented to them. These conditions are believed to have amplified a sense of group cohesion, as participants were physically gathered in close proximity with limited individual visibility. The darkness likely obscured the view of the rituals about to take place, while the seating arrangement, facing inward toward the center of the hall, reinforced the feeling of collective participation in a shared experience.

This inward-facing architecture concentrated visual attention toward the center, where the ritual climax occurred. At the height of the ceremony, sacred objects were revealed by the hierophant, often accompanied by a sudden burst of light. This dramatic shift from darkness to brightness would have had a strong sensory and emotional impact, momentarily overwhelming the initiates’ vision and limiting their ability to clearly see the objects being displayed.

Additionally, the Telesterion’s internal columns created partial obstructions, further interrupting lines of sight to the central ritual space. These architectural features contributed to a deliberate manipulation of visual perception, heightening the mystery of the experience. As visual clarity was restricted, initiates were prompted to rely more heavily on their sense of hearing, an effect that worked in tandem with the Telesterion’s acoustics to shape the ritual encounter.
