= Hypsi =

Hypsi or Hypsoi (Ancient Greek: Ὕψοι) was a settlement in ancient Laconia, containing temples of Asclepius and Artemis Daphnaea, situated 30 stadia from the Carneium on Mount Cnacadium.

Its site is unlocated, but was near Las.
