= Hyperteleatum =

Coordinates: 36°43′51″N 22°54′06″E

Hyperteleatum or Hyperteleaton (Ancient Greek: Ὑπερτελέατον) was a place in ancient Laconia, in the territory of Asopus, at the distance of 50 stadia from the latter town, containing a temple of Asclepius.

Its site is located near the modern Foiniki.
