= The Immortality Key =

Book written by Brian C. Muraresku

The Immortality Key: The Secret History of the Religion with No Name is a book written by Brian C. Muraresku.

== Background ==
The book explores the question of whether the communion wine in early Christianity contained hallucinogens. Muraresku spent 12 years researching the topic. The book discusses the Eleusinian Mysteries and their connection to early Christianity. Muraresku acknowledges in the book that his theory is speculative. Stone Village Television optioned the book for a television series. Muraresku had an interview on CNN to discuss the book.

== Reception ==
The audiobook was the number 10 New York Times best seller throughout the month of November in 2020. The audiobook was number 6 in nonfiction books on Audible in October 2020.
