= Aulon (Messenia) =

Aulon (Ancient Greek: Αὐλών) was a town in ancient Messenia mentioned by Stephanus of Byzantium and Pausanias.

Its site is unlocated.
