= Bacchoi =

Initiates of the Eleusinian mysteries

In the Eleusinian Mysteries, the bakchoi were the branches of initiates that carried out the procession along the Sacred Way, the twenty-one kilometer hike from Athens to Eleusis. The term is sometimes distinguished from mystai (initiate), specifically the Eleusinian initiate, only for the purpose of emphasis since the two words are considered synonymous. The bacchoi was considered a transformed state after performing initiations and this was described by Euripides in the case of his Cretans, who proclaimed they were made holy – mystai and bacchoi – after cleansing themselves through initiation.

Bacchoi is sometimes attached to other terms. For instance, there is Iacchoi-Bacchoi, where Iacchos served as a synonym for Bacchus.

== See also ==
- List of Greek deities
