= Carlo Giuliano =

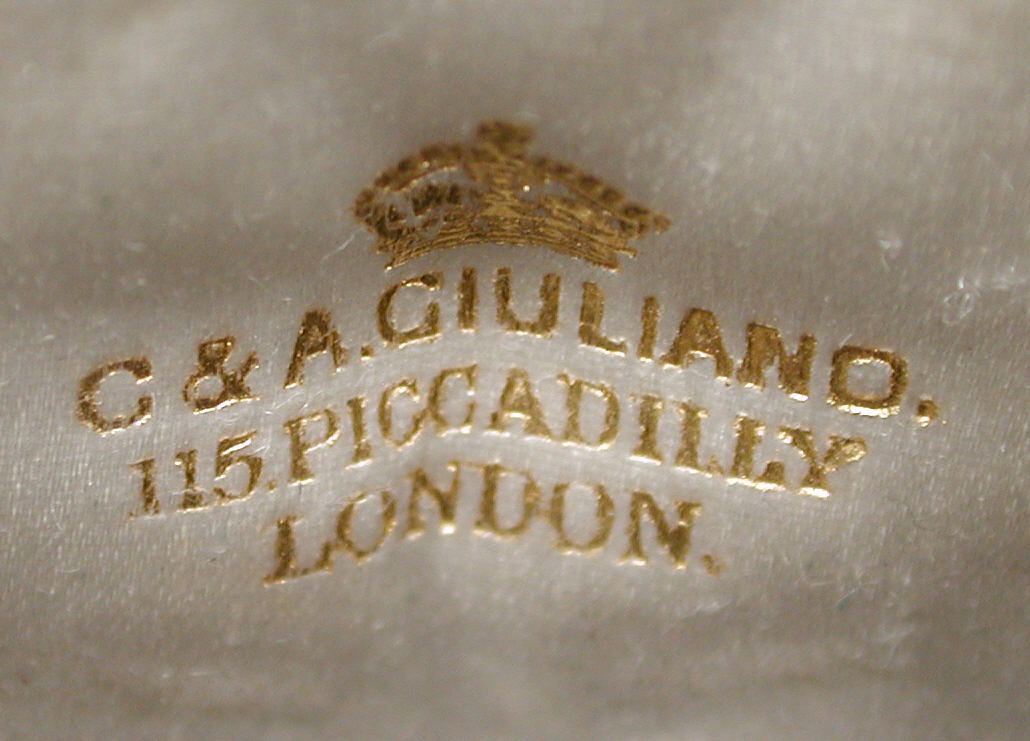
The firm of Carlo & Arthur Giuliano in London

Carlo Giuliano (1831–1895) was a goldsmith and jeweller operating in London from 1860. He started work in Naples for Alessandro Castellani and was sent to London to establish a branch of the Casa Castellani. He left Castellani's employ in the early 1860s and in turn worked for Robert Phillips, Harry Emanuel, Hunt & Roskell, and Hancocks & Co - all leading London jewellers. In 1875, he set out on his own, starting a retail outlet at 115 Piccadilly, and specialising in Renaissance-style design.

== Early life and career ==
Carlo Giuliano, born in Naples in 1831, was trained as a goldsmith under the mentorship of Alessandro Castellani, one of the most influential jewelers of the 19th century, known for his Renaissance Revivalist designs. In the early 1860s, Giuliano was sent to London to help establish a branch of Casa Castellani, but he eventually left Castellani's employ to work for some of the leading jewelers in London, including Robert Phillips and Harry Emanuel. In 1860, Giuliano founded his own workshop, where he quickly gained a reputation for his Renaissance-inspired jewelry, blending Italian craftsmanship with British aristocratic tastes. His intricate designs and attention to detail soon attracted Queen Victoria and other prominent figures of the era, solidifying his position as a master jeweler.

== Signature style and techniques ==
Giuliano’s jewelry was known for its intricate enamel work and Renaissance Revival motifs, which drew inspiration from classical art and architecture. His pieces frequently employed champlevé and cloisonné enamel techniques, which allowed him to create rich, polychromatic designs. The bold colors in his enamel work, often combined with precious gemstones such as rubies, emeralds, and sapphires, gave his jewelry a striking contrast. This unique use of color and texture set his designs apart from other Victorian Revivalist jewelry. His meticulous attention to detail, particularly in granulation and enameling, earned him a reputation as one of the finest jewelers of his timece.

Giuliano’s meticulous use of polychromatic enamel was one of his most significant innovations and became a hallmark of his work. His techniques shaped the Victorian Revivalist movement, merging Renaissance influences with modern design elements. A notable example is a vase-shaped pendant from 1867, part of the V&A Museum collection, which demonstrates his mastery of cloisonné enamel alongside precious materials like rubies, diamonds, and pearls. This pendant exemplifies his ability to balance intricate enamel work with gemstone settings, elevating Renaissance-inspired jewelry to a new level.

== Legacy and influence ==
After Carlo Giuliano’s death in 1895, his sons, Carlo Joseph and Arthur Alphonse Giuliano, took over the family business, continuing their father's commitment to exceptional craftsmanship.

Today, Carlo Giuliano’s pieces are highly valued by collectors and scholars alike, and his work is featured in prominent museum collections, including the Victoria and Albert Museum, The Metropolitan Museum of Art and the British Museum.

Giuliano’s influence extended beyond his lifetime, with his innovative techniques in enamel and gem-setting continuing to inspire jewelers in the 20th century and beyond.
