= Bir Sikhanwala (sacred grove) =

Forest in India

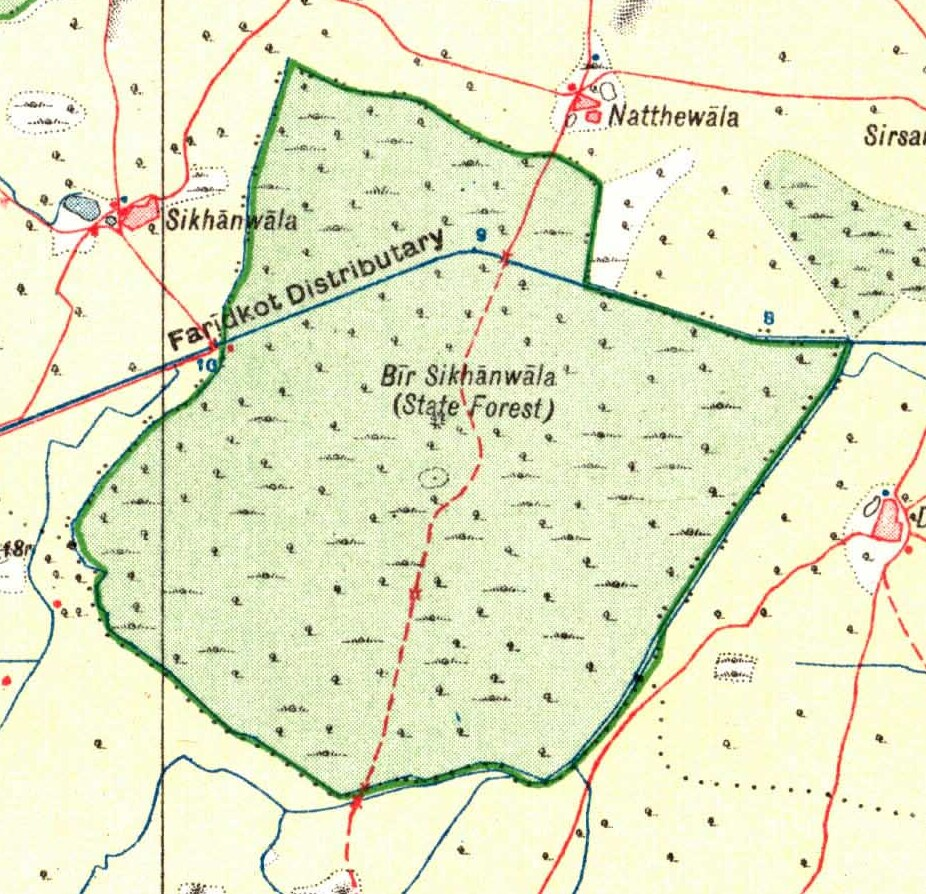
Sacred-grove of Bir Sikhanwala, Survey of India geographical block-map for 45 J)14 Ferozepore District (1913).

Bir Sikhanwala, also spelt as Bir Sikhan Wala, is a sacred-grove (known as a jhidi in Punjabi) located in the Faridkot district of Punjab, India. There is a nearby village sharing the same name. The grove is associated with Kala Mehar.

== Etymology ==
In Punjabi, the word bir refers to a forest or communal-pasture. The word sikhanwala refers to the proximity of the forest to the settlement of Sikhanwala.

== Area ==
The forest comprises around 9.35 hectares. However, other sources state the total area is spread over 200 to 300 acres of land. Yet another source claims the area is over 2,000 acres.

Leopards have been spotted within the forest.

== Religious significance ==
There is a local festival, akin to a traditional mela, dedicated to a local saint named Baba Kala Mehar. Baba Kala Mehar is a jathera of the Sandhu clan of Jats. A unique quirk of the festival is that devotees offer alcohol as prashad to the saint, which is believed to grant wishes. The festival is held every month on the day of ‘masya’ to offer liquor, with around 50,000 attendees. After consuming alcohol, many attendees go-on to dine at the langar communal kitchen.

== History ==
The forest is believed to have been reserved by the Faridkot rulers in-order to construct a temple dedicated to the local saint, Baba Kala Mehar. The zamindar landlords used the forest for hunting. After independence, the union and state governments banned hunting in reserved forest areas.

After the death of the last Faridkot ruler, Harinder Singh, in 1989, he bestowed his property in his will to the Maharawal Khewaji Trust, including the Bir Sikhanwala. However, the validity of the will was contested by Harinder Singh's eldest daughter Amrit Kaur, as it named his two other daughters, Deepinder Kaur and Maheepinder Kaur, as chairperson and vice-chairperson, respectively, of the trust, leaving her out. The estate of the former ruler consisted of thousands of acres of reserved forest. However, since the 1980s encroachers gradually started illegally occupying portions of the area and constructing structures. In 1996, a court ordered that the encroachers had no legal right to stay there and in 2013, a 150 families of encroachers were evicted from the land, however those that constructed concrete houses were not evicted due to political pressure. The property of the forest was under the Meharwal Kheva Ji Trust but its ownership was invalidated by a Chandigarh court verdict based on the will of Harinder Singh Brar, the last ruler of Faridkot State. Some acres were leased to the Punjab Agricultural University (PAU) for a seed farm, which later was accused of embezzlement. Amrit Kaur, eldest daughter of the late ruler Harinder Singh, went to court against her younger sister and the trust and won. The Mehrawal Khewaji Trust was deemed illegal.

In early 2003, the Punjab Police raided the pond area of Bir Sikhanwala where a group was allegedly plotting thefts and robberies, arresting one in the process. In 2016, controversy arose over the illegal ferrying of stray cattle from Bathinda to Bir Sikhanwala.
