= Sidh Bhoi =

Sidh Bhoi, also spelt Sidh Bhoe, is both a jathera (ancestor-figure) and sidh for the Dhaliwals. Sidh Bhoi in folk legend is remembered for fighting the Pachadians near Sardulgarh. According to lore, he was slain by robbers while he was with a Brahmin, Mirasi, Chuhra, and black-dog. Whilst the Brahmin fled, the others remained. At his shrines, the Mirasis receive his offerings and a black-dog is fed on certain occasions. Sidh Bhoi also features in other Punjabi folk legends, such as in Gill folklore, where he is featured alongside Rattan Mal and Kalu Nath. According to Sant Visakha Singh, the Gills built memorials dedicated to Sidh Bhoi on the outskirts of Lopo near Badhni, at Rajeana near Bagha Purana, and another nearby Lallu Wal village.

== Shrines ==
His tomb is at Lalowala in Mansa district and his fair is observed on Nimani Ekadashi. The Shaheed Baba Siddh Bhoi Ji Welfare Society (Regd. 2569) operates and arranges a three-day annual Jod Mela (religious fair) at the primary shrine of Sidh Bhoi found in village Kot Lallu, Mansa district. The fair attracts attendees from devotees who traveled from various regions including Rajasthan, Delhi, Maharashtra, Haryana, and different parts of Punjab. The organization constructed a hospital and school in the name of Sidh Bhoi.

In the village of Saheri, (Morinda, District - Ropar) there is a shrine dedicated to Baba Bhoi Ji, (sewadar - Smt Salma ji) where devotees pay their respects with great reverence; on the day of Diwali, people even travel from far away to offer their obeisance.

== See also ==
- Bhamipura Kalan
