= Shaheed shrine =

A Shaheed shrine is a building constructed to commemorate and show respect to a saint and forms part of Punjabi folk religion in the Punjab region.

== Punjabi Folk Cosmology ==
In Punjabi folk cosmology, the universe is divided into three realms:

English	Punjabi	Inhabitants
Sky	Akash	Dev Lok (Angels)
Earth	Dharti	Matlok (Humans)
Underworld	Naglok	Nagas (Serpents)

Devlok is the realm of the gods, saints and ancestors, existing in akash, the sky.

A Shaheed can be martyred and hence achieve sainthood or can become a saint in the afterlife.

Although not part of organised religion, Shaheed Shrines only form part of Sikh and Muslim folk religion. However, such shrines are respected by all faiths.

Sikhs prefer to use the term Shaheed "jaggah" (but sometimes also use the term "smadh") whereas Muslims also use the term dargah or mazaar for such shrines if the shrine is near a grave. Muslim Shaheed Shrines typically represent Sufi saints.

The Hindus equivalent of Shaheeds are Siddhs of the Siddha tradition. Siddha shrines are either referred to as Mandirs or Samadhs.

== Worship ==
Saint worship in shrines is common in the Punjab region. People of all faiths attend and venerate shrines in honour of saints.

These shrines represent sources of power (barkat) to the common people and are open to people from all religious persuasions. The shrines can be at the final resting places of the saints (dargahs) or ‘memorial shrines’. These memorial shrines have evolved into a distinct form of ‘saint worship’. These shrines represent inter-communal dialogue and a distinct form of cultural practice of saint veneration.

== Shrines ==
Shrines can be local, such as the shrine of Bhagat Baba Kalu and Baba Nihal Singh Ji, or they can be popular across a larger area forming part of folklore, such as the shrines of Sakhi Sarwar, also known as Baba Lakhadata whose larger central shrine is in Sakhi Sarwar of Dera Ghazi Khan District, Pakistan and the smaller shrine in Una, Himachal Pradesh, India. Other popular shrines include those of Gugga Ji and Khawaja Khizr.

== Photo gallery ==
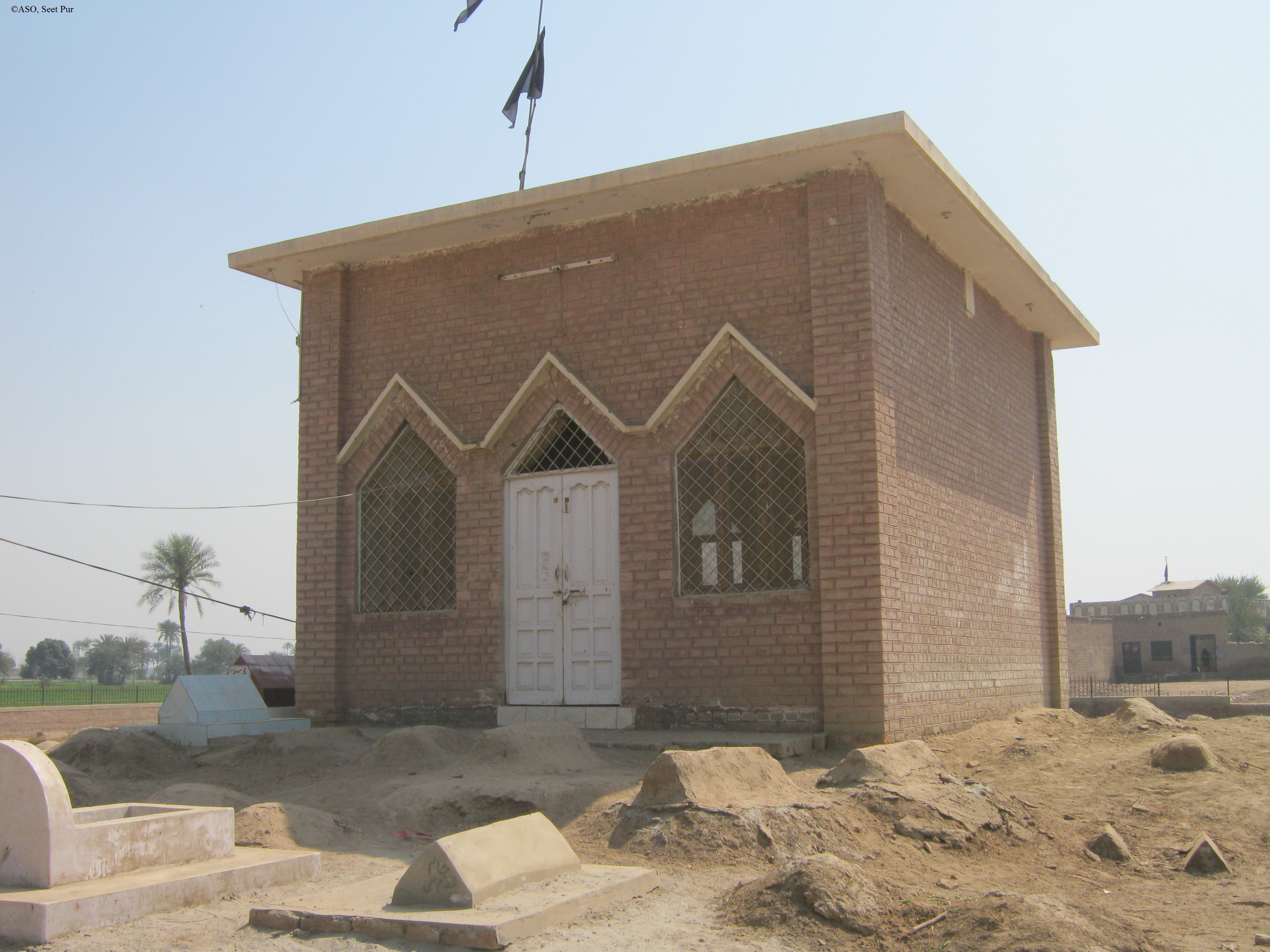
Shah Bilwal's Tomb, Muzzafargarh, Punjab, Pakistan

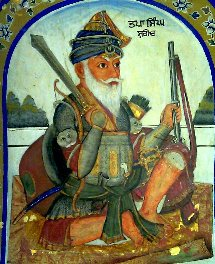
Tapa Singh Shaheed

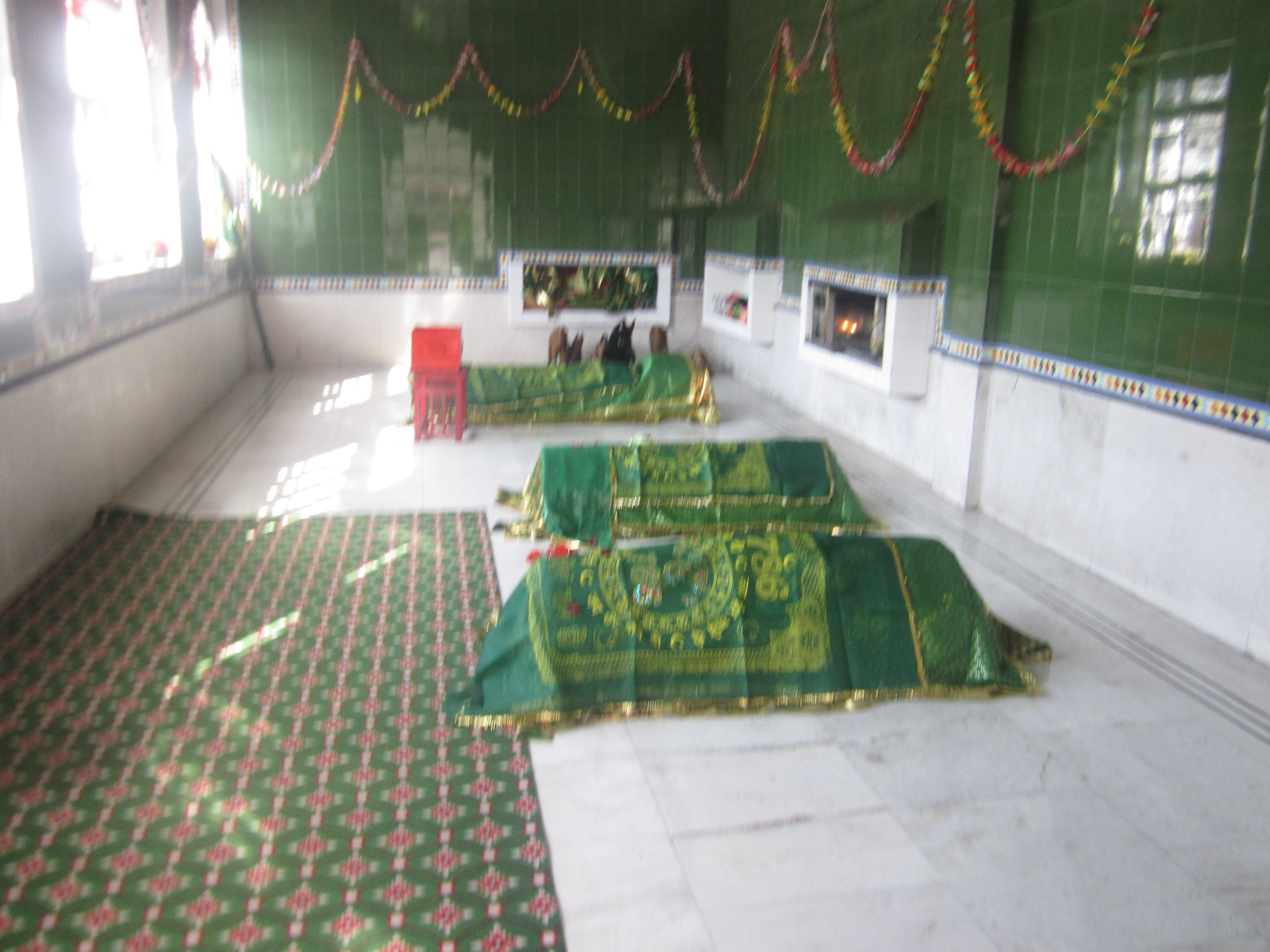
Shrine Baba Budda Ji Nakodar

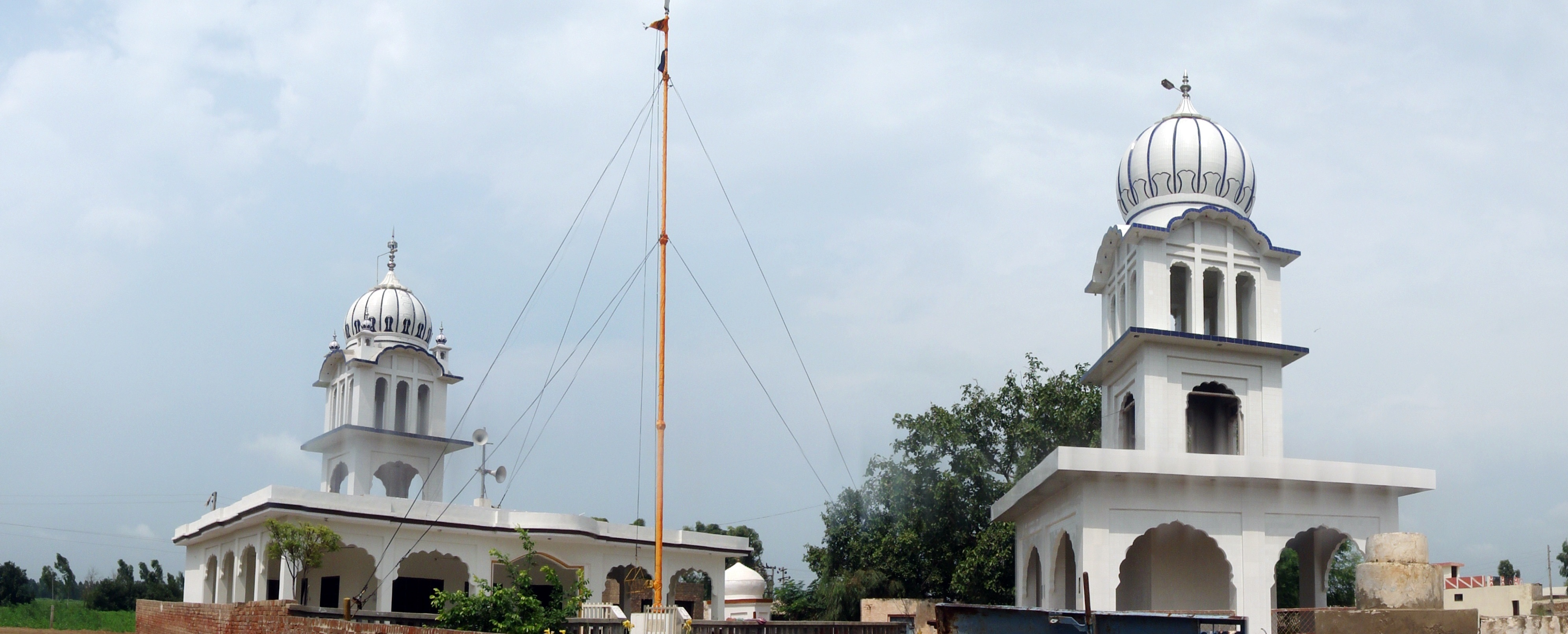
Gurudwara Sahib & Baba Bala ji Smadh Ghuriana

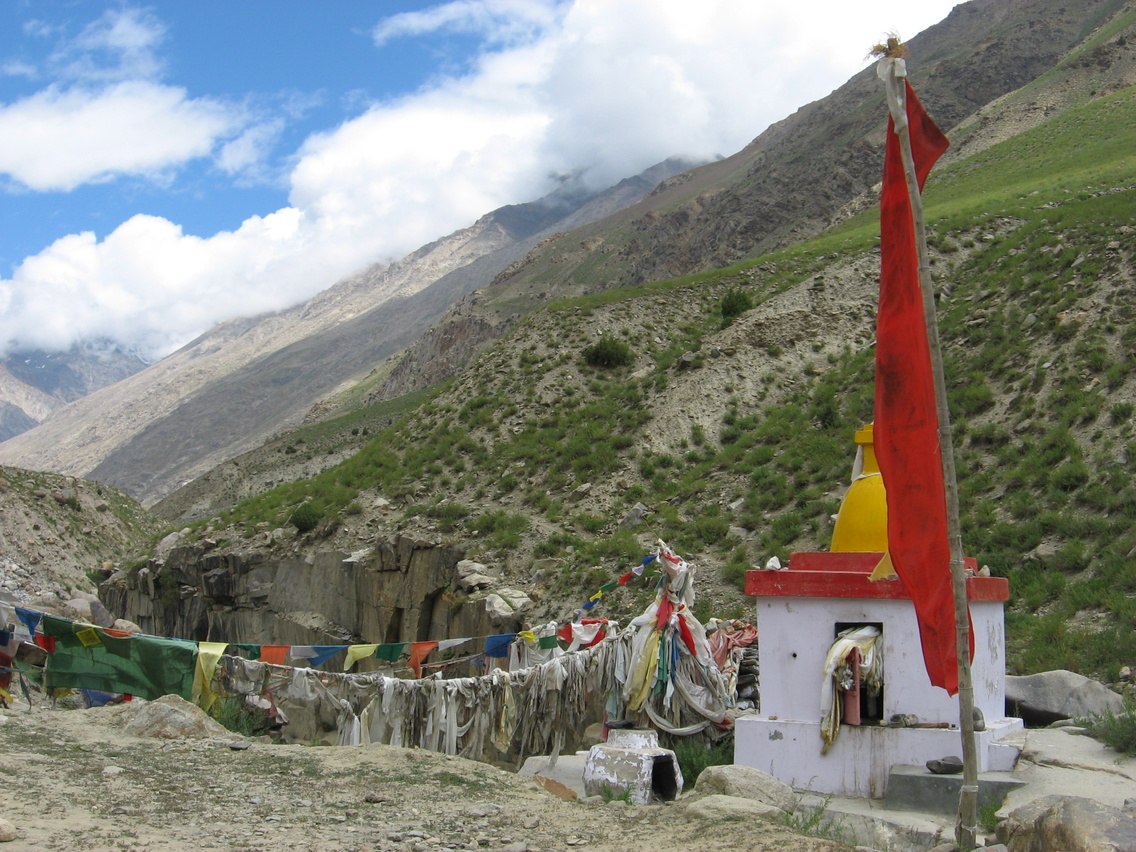
prayer flags Hindu shrine and red flag

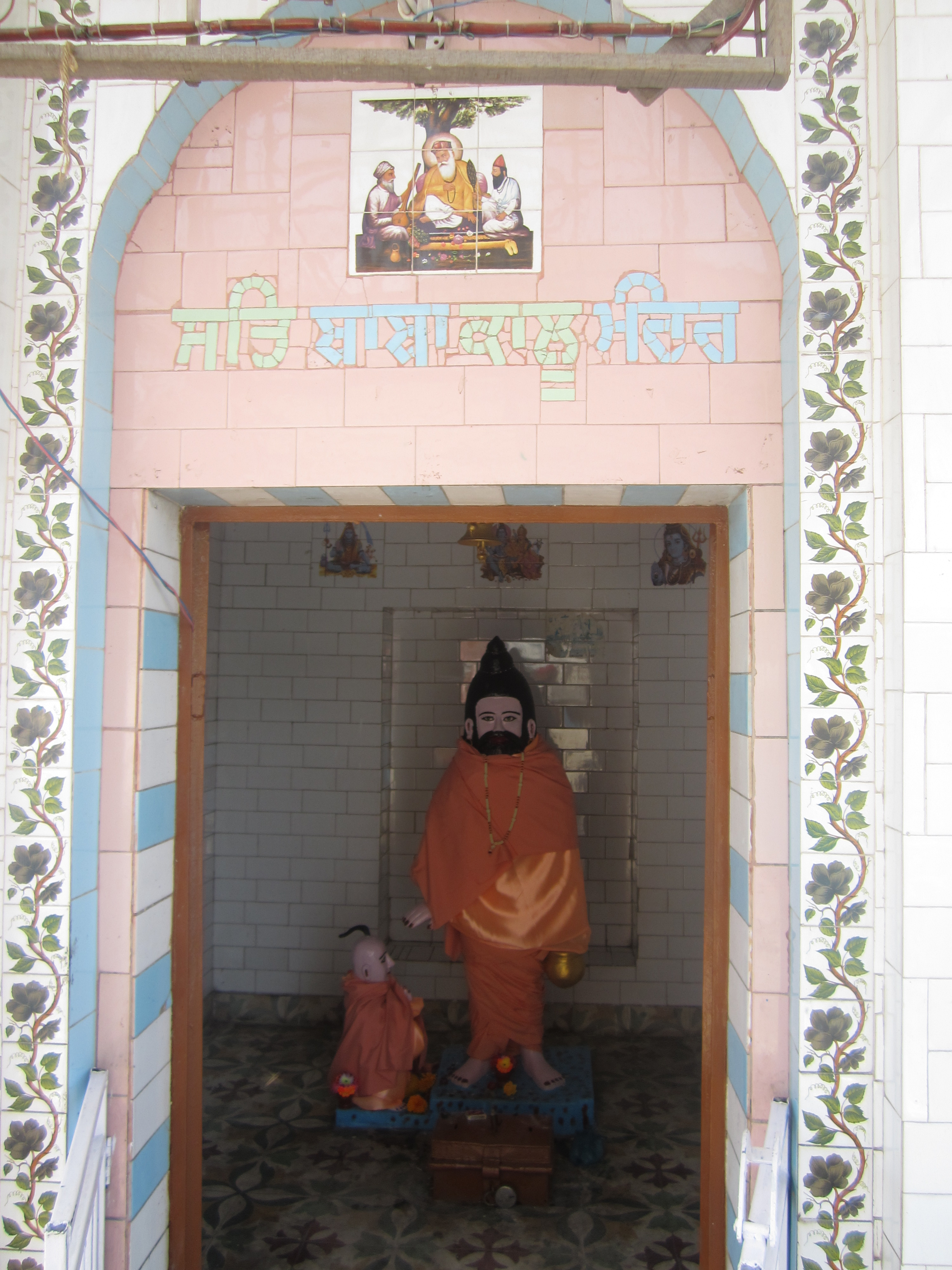
Bhagat Baba Kalu Ji Panchhat

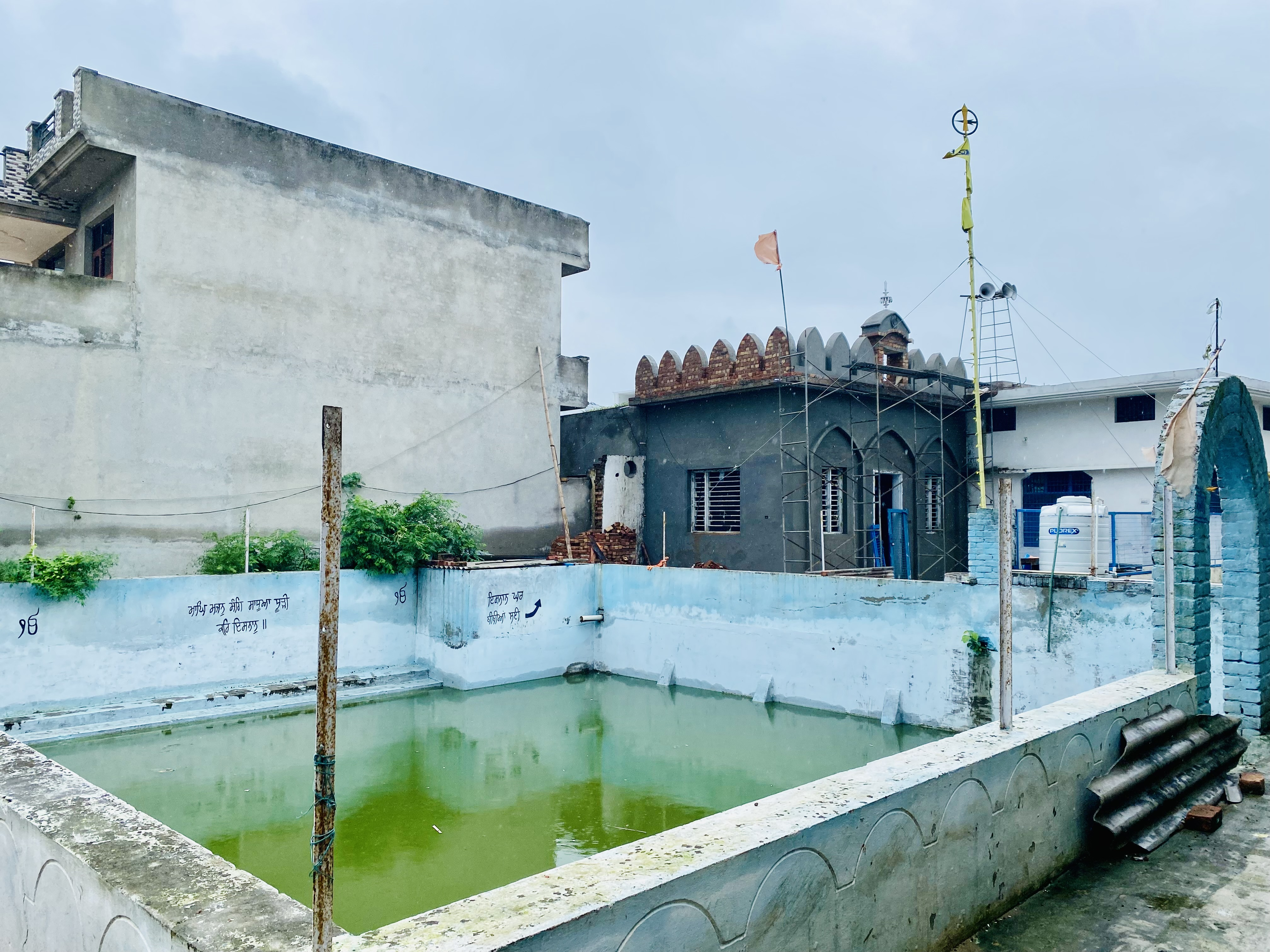
Samaadh Baba Tirath Ji
