= Jogi Pir =

Ancestor-deity

Jogi Pir, also spelt Joga Peer, is the jathera (ancestor-figure) for the Chahal Jats. The recorded version of the hagiographical tale claims Jogi Pir came into conflict with Pathans and Bhattis in the 13th century. According to folk-tale, Jogi Pir was digging a well when he was attacked and decapitated, however his corpse continued to live-on and continued carrying baskets of mud. Jogi is classified as a bir, referring to victims who died a violent death, not to be confused with a martyr (shahid). The tale connects Jogi Pir to Kuli Chahilan near the city of Moga in Punjab, where a fair is held in his memory. A fair is held at the Baba Jogi Peer shrine in Mansa bi-annually in April and September. The Baba Jogi Pir Trust is a namesake organization. The shrine at Mansa was legally disputed in the 2010s over the funds of the shrine. At the shrine, which is 15 acres, is a 60-ft tower, which had started tilting dangerously in 2014.
