= Bhamipura Kalan =

Coordinates: 30.708°N 75.468°E

Bhammipura Kalan is a village in Ludhiana District of Punjab State in India. It is 14 km south of Jagraon and about 55 km from Ludhiana city. The village consists mostly of Dhaliwal and Chahal families. The memorial of founder of Dhaliwal families "Baba Sidh Bhoe" is in also in this village. The village is neighboring to the villages of Deharka, Akhara, Dalla, Manuke, Bassuwal, Cheema, and Bhammipura Khurd. The famous Gurdwara Mehdiana sahib Mehdiana Sahib is 5 km from village.
