= Sakhi Sarwar =

Pakistani town

Sakhi Sarwar سخی سرور سخی لکھ داتا
- Town
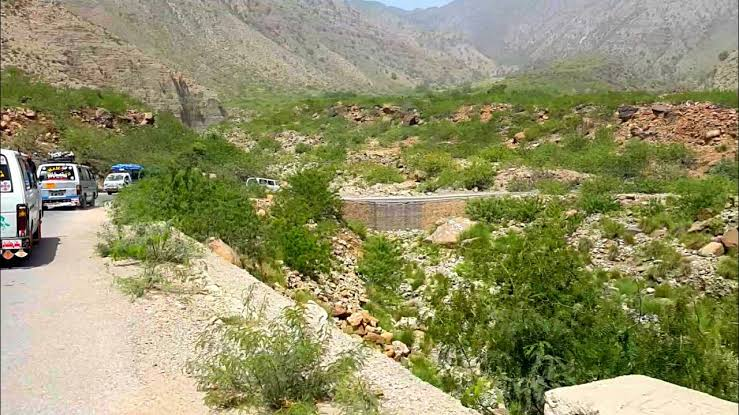

- Location in Pakistan
- Coordinates: 29°58′45″N 70°18′21″E
- Country: Pakistan
- Province: Punjab
- District: Dera Ghazi Khan District
- Elevation: 932 ft (284 m)
- Time zone: UTC+5 (PST)
  - Summer (DST): +6

Sakhi Sarwar (Urdu, Punjabi, Balochi: سخی سرور) is a town in Dera Ghazi Khan District, Punjab (Pakistan). It is named after a Muslim Sufi saint Syed Ahmad Sultan, also known as Sakhi Sarwar, whose tomb is situated in the vicinity.

The tomb itself was built in the 13th century in a small village named Muqam in the Sulaiman Mountains, 35 kilometres (22 mi) from Dera Ghazi Khan and 110 Kilometres from Multan. It was later expanded by the Mughal king Zahir-ud-din Muhammad Babur. It is a unique building of Mughal architecture.

An urs, or festival in the honour of Syed Ahmad Sultan, also locally called "Sangh Mela", has been celebrated for centuries during Vaisakhi (March–April), with thousands of pilgrims coming to the town from the nearby localities. First they visit to the shrine of Syed Sakhi Zain ul Abideen at Lar Multan to pay homage to the parents of Sakhi Sarwar, then they go to Dera Ghazi Khan. Sarwaris love the belongings of the saint, specially the Mohar Mubarak. Historically, followers of Syed Ahmad Sultan belonged to various religions – Max Arthur Macauliffe, a colonial office appointed in Punjab, observed in 1875 that not only Muslims but Hindus also visited the shrines during the urs.

On 3 April 2011, at the annual festival (urs) in the honour Syed Ahmad Sultan, a twin suicide attack left 112 dead and almost two hundred injured.

== See also ==
- Sufism
- Punjabi folk religion
- Dhaunkal
- Bharai, a Muslim community found in the states of Himachal Pradesh and Punjab in India
- Mukandpur a village near Banga, Nawanshahr district (also known as Shahid Bhagat Singh Nagar, in Punjab, India. The village has an annual mela in honour of Sakhi Sarwar.
- Lakhpur a village near Sahni (Lakhpur-Sahni), Tehsil Phagwara, Kapurthala district, in Punjab, India. The village has a shrine in honour of Sakhi Sarwar who is referred to a Baba Lakhadata Ji.
