= Kala Mehar =

Ancestor deity

Kala Mehar, also spelt as Kala Mihr, is the jathera (ancestor-figure) for the Sandhu clan of Jats. He is also known as Kala Pir. According to hagiographical accounts, he was originally a leader of the Sandhus, who later began worshipping him. Local lore claims Kala Mehar had an antagonistic relationship with the Muslim Bhatti clan, who supposedly decapitated Kala Mehar in a fight but he went-on fighting miracously. He is portrayed as a protector of cows who possessed a magical buffalo. Popular iconography of Kala Mehar bears Sikh influences and he is depicted similarly to Gugga or Baba Deep Singh.

The worship of Kala Mehar has become popularized and spread beyond the Sandhu Jats, with him being venerated not only by them but also other caste groups. Furthermore, worship is not confined to Punjab but can also be found in some areas of Rajasthan and Haryana. However, the hagiographies on Kala Mehar differ between Punjab, Haryana, and Rajasthan.

== Tale ==
According to what can be deciphered from the various accounts on Kala Mehar, the lore on his life can be summarized as follows: He was born as Kala Sandhu to a Jat father who prayed to the Panj Pir quintet for a son via the Mirasis. According to one narration, he was originally from the Lahore region and a cattle-thief. The story claims he was acquainted with Gorakhnath and magically produced milk from a non-lactating buffalo for Gorakhnath. In-return, Gorakhnath predicted he would become a warrior and bestowed him with the Mehar ("giver of miracles") title, henceforth he was known as Kala Mehar. Kala Mehar's magical buffalo was stolen by the Muslim Bhattis of the region, thus they came into conflict with one another.

According to the legend, Kala Mehar never closed his eyes to sleep, so the Muslim Bhattis had to kill him to steal the magical bovine. The Bhattis tried to learn the secret on how to slay Kala Mehar from his Muslim Mirasi companion Siddh Jivan, but he refused to give-up any intel, so they learnt how from the Brahmin cook on how to kill Kala Mehar. They decapitated Kala Mehar but he kept fighting the Bhattis despite not having a head, although his companion Siddh Jivan was killed in the fight with the Bhattis. After fighting, the headless body of Kala Mehar was riding on a horse until a woman dyeing clothes with indigo (neel) on the bank of a forest (bir) sprinkled neel on the headless body to calm it, causing the headless corpse to collapse. News reached the Panj Pir and Gorakhnath and their followers, who convened at Bir Sikhanwala. Gorakhnath's followers wanted to cremate the remains of Kala Mehar as per Indic customs whilst the followers of the Panj Pir wanted to bury it as per the customs of Islam. However, the corpse of Kala Mehar disappeared while they were debating on how to dispose of the remains and only the bricks it had laid-on remained behind, with a voice from above commanding them that all donations dedicated to his shrine be given to the Mirasis and not to Brahmins.

== Shrines ==
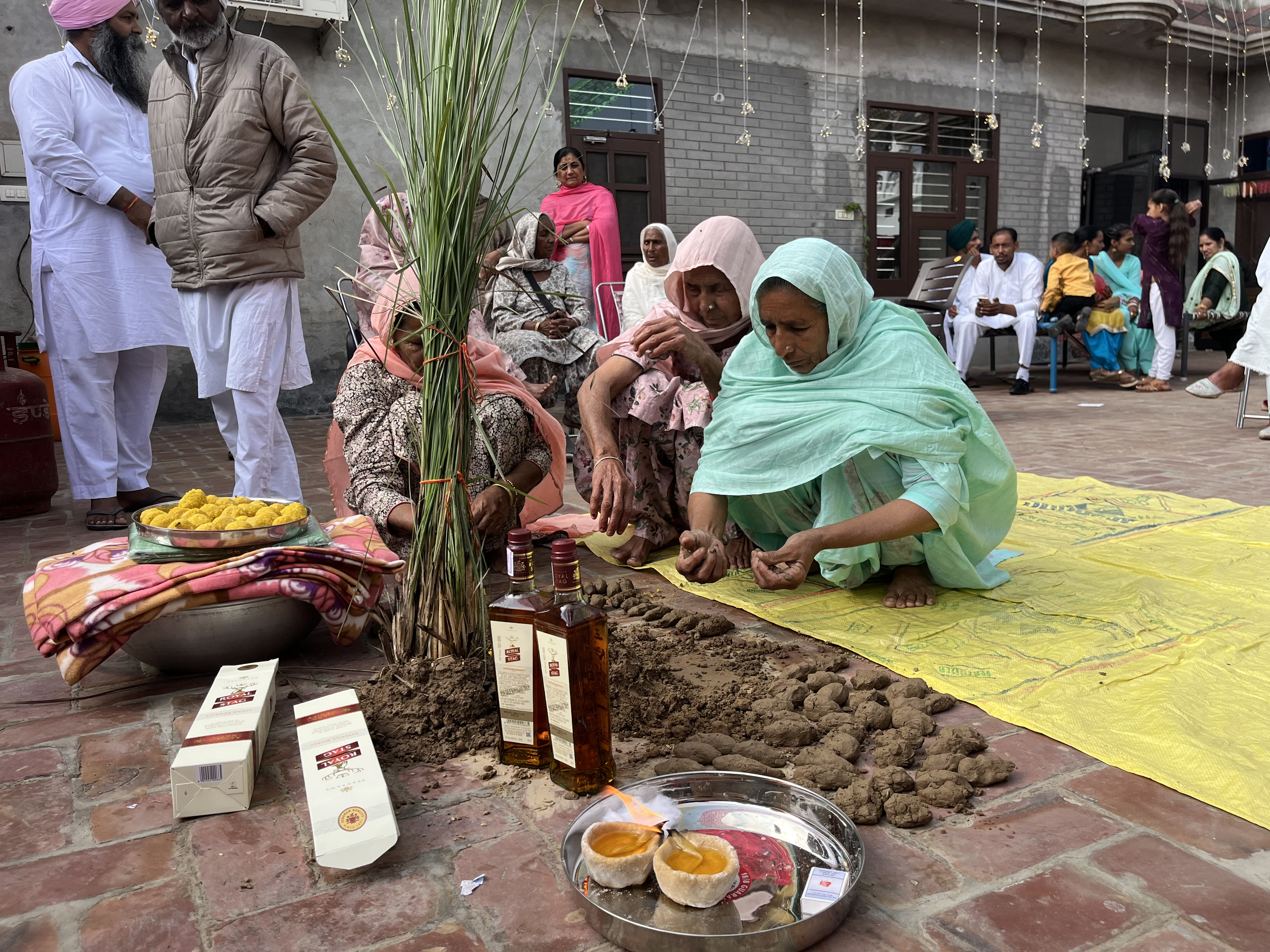
Ancestor worship ritual to bless newly weds at the shrine of Kala Mehar, including alcohol-based offerings

There are a number of ancestral-shrines dedicated to him. A shrine dedicated to him is located at Bhakna village near Amritsar. The largest shrine dedicated to him is located in the sacred-grove of Bir Sikhanwala. At the Sikhanwala shrine, a unique practice of offering alcohol to the jathara as prashad takes place. The first milk of a cow is offered to him. At one of his shrines, Brahmins are banned from receiving offerings and only Mirasis can take the offerings. Annually on the masya (night of no moon) of the month of Chet (March-April) Mirasis perform at the shrine and Kala Mehar and are given monetary donations and gifts by devotees. The Kala Mehar Sandhu Charitable Society is a namesake organization.
