= Folk practices in Punjab =

Folk practices prevalent in Punjab incorporate local mysticism and refer to the beliefs and practices strictly indigenous to the Punjabi people, of the Punjab region including ancestral worship, veneration of saints, and local festivals. There are many shrines in Punjab which represent the folk religion of the Punjab region which is a discourse between different organised religions. These shrines represent inter-communal dialogue and a distinct form of cultural practice of saint veneration.

Roger Ballard (1999) classifies Punjab's folk religion into the kismetic (misfortune caused by fate, or supernatural beings) dimension of Punjabi religious life, alongside its panth (inspirational leadership), dharam (divine laws), and qaum (community construction) elements. The kismetic belief holds that misfortune can be caused by both unfulfilled, jealous spirits like bhuts (ghosts), dhags, jinns, and churails (witches), as well as by other people through the use of magic, including spells and incantations, and the evil eye (nazar). Various folk beliefs are also attached to almost all birds and animals, which serve as omens, vessels of powers, or sacrifices.

Alongside beliefs in folk heroes and ancestors, belief in mostly malevolent spirits, often resulting from untimely deaths and motivated by envy from unfulfilled desires relating to life milestones like childlessness, indulge in varying degrees of harm on the living. The nazar, causing misfortune and damage via jealous gazes, is most often targeted at one's family members, land and crops, and personal property, and protected against by amulets, customs, and various social mores, including humility.

The practice of folk beliefs are often accompanied by what has been called dhadi or folk ballads, that complement more institutionalized music forms like kirtan and qawwali.

Prevailing views present Punjabi folk religion as being remnants of older religious traditions or degenerated forms of organized religion, which H. S. Bhatti states is a misconception and that Punjabi folk religion consists of "processes of alternative conceptualizations".

== Purposes ==
Such functional, fluid folk religion often takes form in seeking out help in the form of those regarded as healers and spiritual masters, often in times of anxiety, grief, or anger, in regards to ancestors, family, and death, and within "cognitive frameworks of illness and healing."

== Position in society ==
Folk beliefs are most widespread in rural areas, and this "popular religion" has been described as the religious practices of Punjab's "subordinate social sector," with miracle-working saints, malevolent deities, evil spirits, witchcraft and other occult practices, and village sites, where these practices are often centered. Saint veneration often revolves around pirs, and along with the patronage of shrines whose lore drew freely from the normative traditions of formalized religions, was practiced syncretically across religious lines.

The shrines of such folk heroes as Gugga Pir and Sakhi Sarwar are made and managed by followers who are often excluded from frameworks of formalized "high" religions in East Punjab, as embodied by the Jat influence on Sikhism, by Brahminical Hinduism, or by Sharia Islam, and fall outside of the scope of such hegemonic institutions, especially as religious identity has become increasingly polarized. The sharpening of religious boundaries through revivalist and reformist movements in the region during colonial times also had an effect on the position of folk beliefs in Punjabi society, which often transcended such boundaries.

The first formal studies of Punjabi folk religion took place in 1971.

Despite being a crucial part of Punjabi religion, in which the inexplicable can be rationalized, its dismissal as superstition and the fact that it defies religious classification has meant that it has remained understudied. Its transcendence of religious boundaries is manifested in its eclectic integration of Sufi, bhakti, and tradition beliefs in the occult, possession, and exorcisms. According to Ballard, there is prejudice against this dimension of Punjab religious practice.

According to cultural historian Dr. Anne Murphy,

Folk traditions have played a crucial generative role in postcolonial scholarly, artistic and literary worlds, representing a kind of response to colonial hegemony and modernity; at the same time, they represent a continuing subaltern cultural formation that at times resists incorporation by these same forces.

== Folk deities, saints, and heroes ==
There are three prominent cults associated with folk deities found in Indian Punjab: Gugga, Sakhi Sarwar, and Seetla. Gugga is also known as Jahir Pir whilst Seetla is also known as Mata Rani. The central figures of folk religion cults in Punjab is organized around ancestor figures or folk heroes, consisting of various legends and rituals associated with them. Gugga was a Rajput prince who became a Sufi pir and is venerated as a serpent-deity, Sakhi Sarwar is said to have come from Baghdad and is worshipped for the protection of children and animals. Seetla and her sisters are worshipped for protection and to guard against some pustulate diseases. These three figures were historically worshipped across Punjabi society, irrespective of caste and creed.

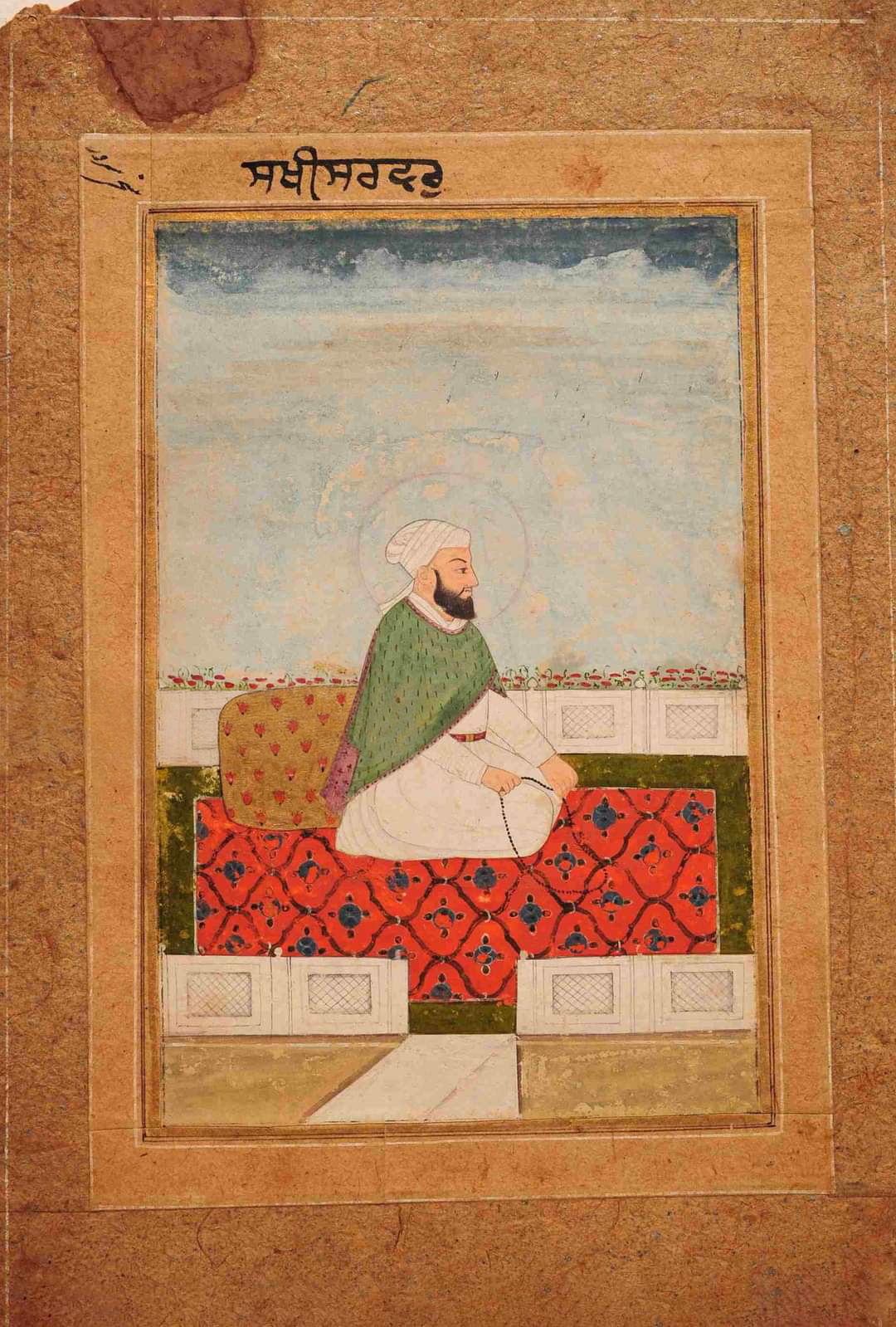
Miniature painting depicting the Punjabi folk deity Sakhi Sarwar, also known as 'Lakhdata'.

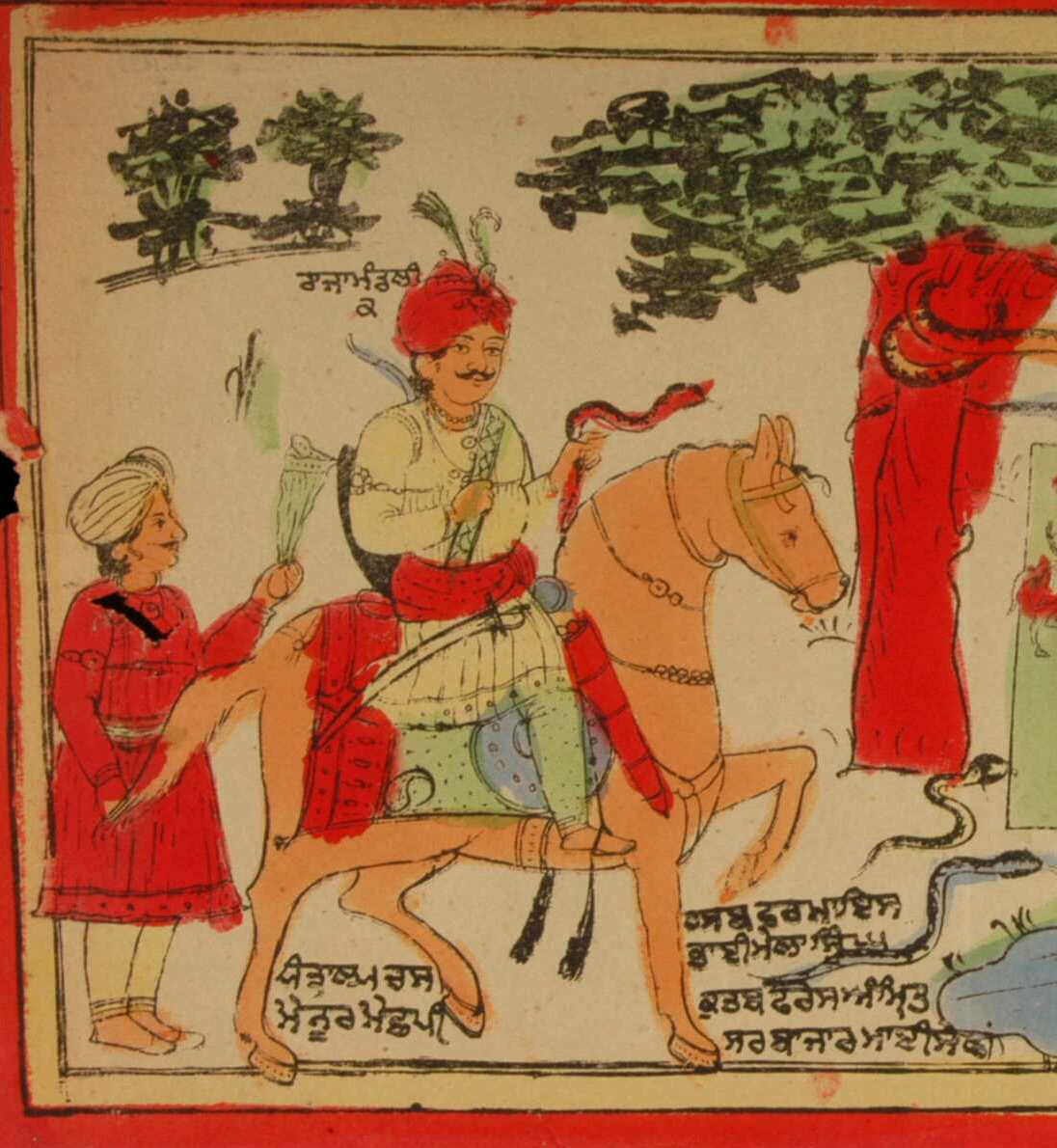
Painting of Gugga Pir, Popular Sikh, Punjab, circa early 20th century

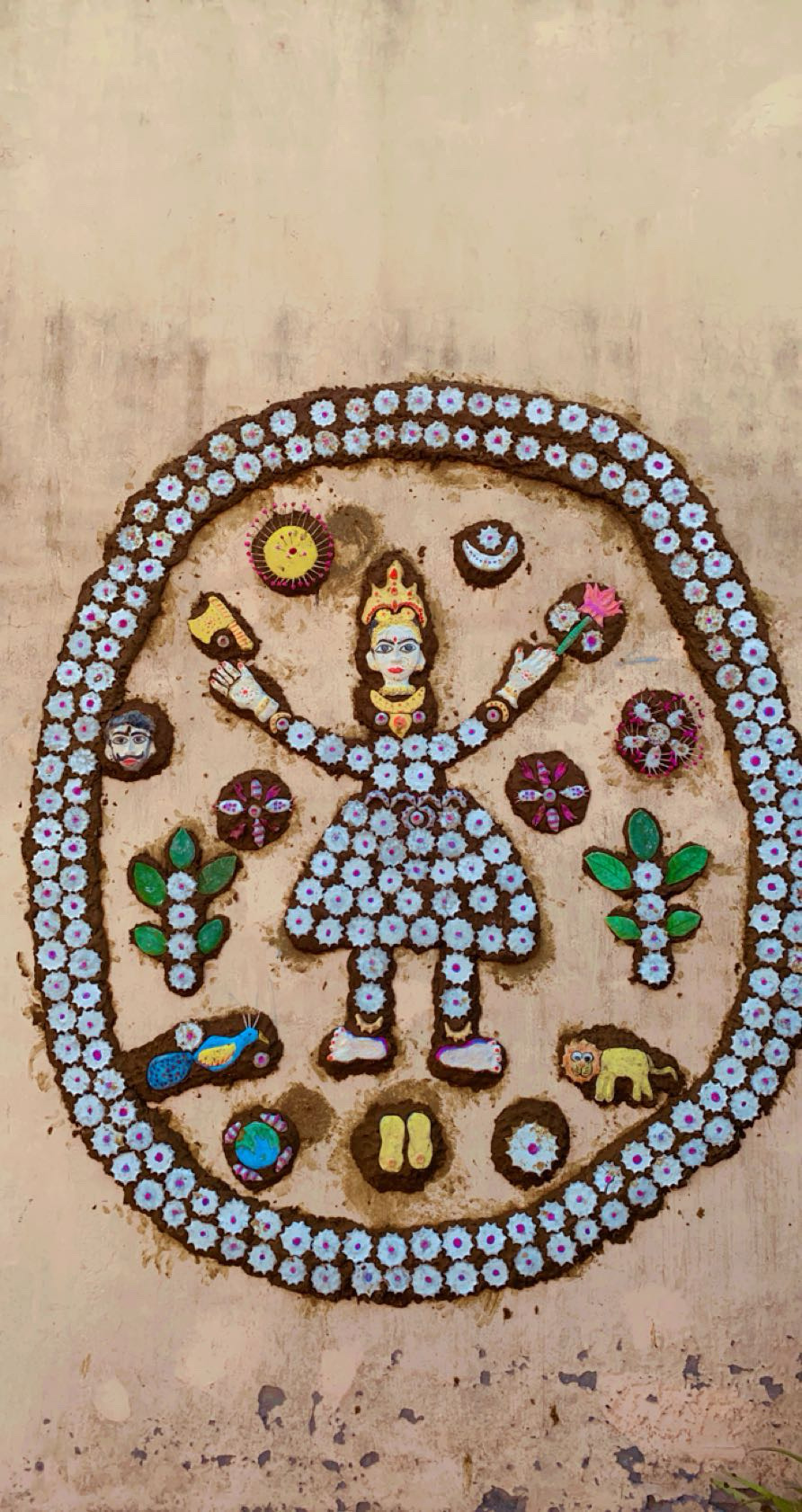
Sanjhi Mata

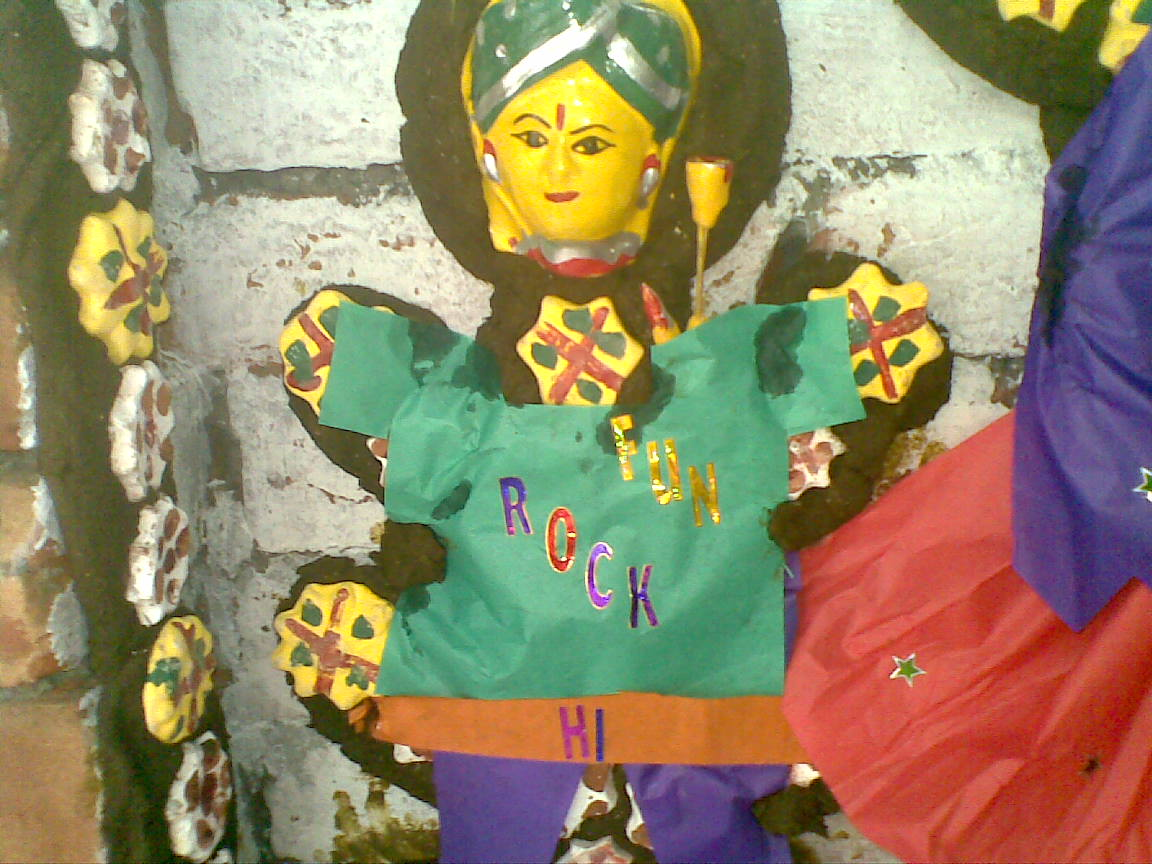
Peddu, brother of Sanjhi Mata

=== Cult of Seetla Mata ===
Seetla Mata, also known as Mata Rani, is a folk deity forming part of Punjabi folk religion. Seetla is the goddess of smallpox and is worshiped for its recovery. She also manifests herself in the form of chicken pox and is venerated for recovery. The cult of Seetla Mata belongs to prehistoric period and is linked to the Harrappa civilisation. On one of the seals found in Harrappa there are the figures of seven girls with long hair. These are believed to be Seetla Mata and her six sisters. Seetla Mata is worshiped in various parts of India, Pakistan, Nepal and Bangladesh. However, the origins and the form of worship varies from region to region.

Seetla Mata has been integrated into Hinduism, where she is known as Shitala. However, her birth is explained in a different manner to the legends prevalent in the Punjab. In Hinduism, she is known as Shitala and is not one of seven sisters.

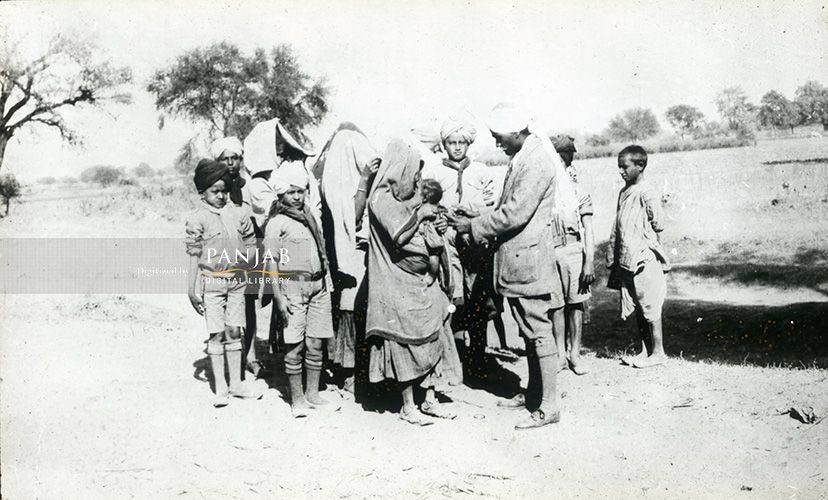
Photograph of a smallpox vaccination program by the Public Health Department, Punjab, circa early 1900's

Shitala is accompanied by Jvarasura, the fever demon, Oladevi, the cholera goddess, Ghentu-debata, the god of skin diseases, Raktabati, the goddess of blood infections and the sixty-four epidemics. Shitala is represented as a young maiden crowned with a winnowing-fan, riding an ass, holding a short broom (either to spread or dust off germs) and a pot full of pulses (the viruses) or cold water (a healing tool).

Seetla Mata is sometimes depicted as having six sisters, and at other times as the eldest of eight sisters, all of whom cause pustular diseases and are venerated for recovery. The sisters are: Masani, Basanti, Maha Mai, Polamde, Lamkaria, and Agwani. There shrines cluster around the central shrine of Seetla Mata. One of them is called Paharwali or of the mountain. In Punjabi, the shrines of the sisters of Seetla Mata are called "matya". Another tradition names the sisters as Phulmati Mata, Chamariya Mata, Durga Kali, Maha Kali, Bhadra Kali, and Kalika Bhavani. Seetla Mata has the following features:

1. Her face is hideous.
2. Her teeth are projecting.
3. Her ears are as large as winnowing fan.
4. Her eyes are huge.
5. Mouth is wide open.
6. She rides an ass.
7. She carries a huge broom in one hand.
8. She has a pitcher and an ewer in the other hand.
9. She has a winnowing fan on her head.
10. She has a snake as a whip.

Seetla Mata may be worshiped at any time of the year. However, the annual period of worship is the Punjabi month of Chait (March–April) as per the Punjabi calendar. Generally, she is worshiped early in the mornings of Monday, Tuesday and Wednesday.

The month of Chait is important in Punjabi culture as it is the last month of the Punjabi calendar and is the season in which wheat ripens. Also, the season is of Basant (spring). One of Seetla Mata's name is Basanti and therefore, she represents the negative side of Basant and is therefore worshiped. Seetla Mata and her sisters reside on the trees of the neem (Azdiracta indica), kikar (Acacia arabica) or jand (Prosopis specigera).

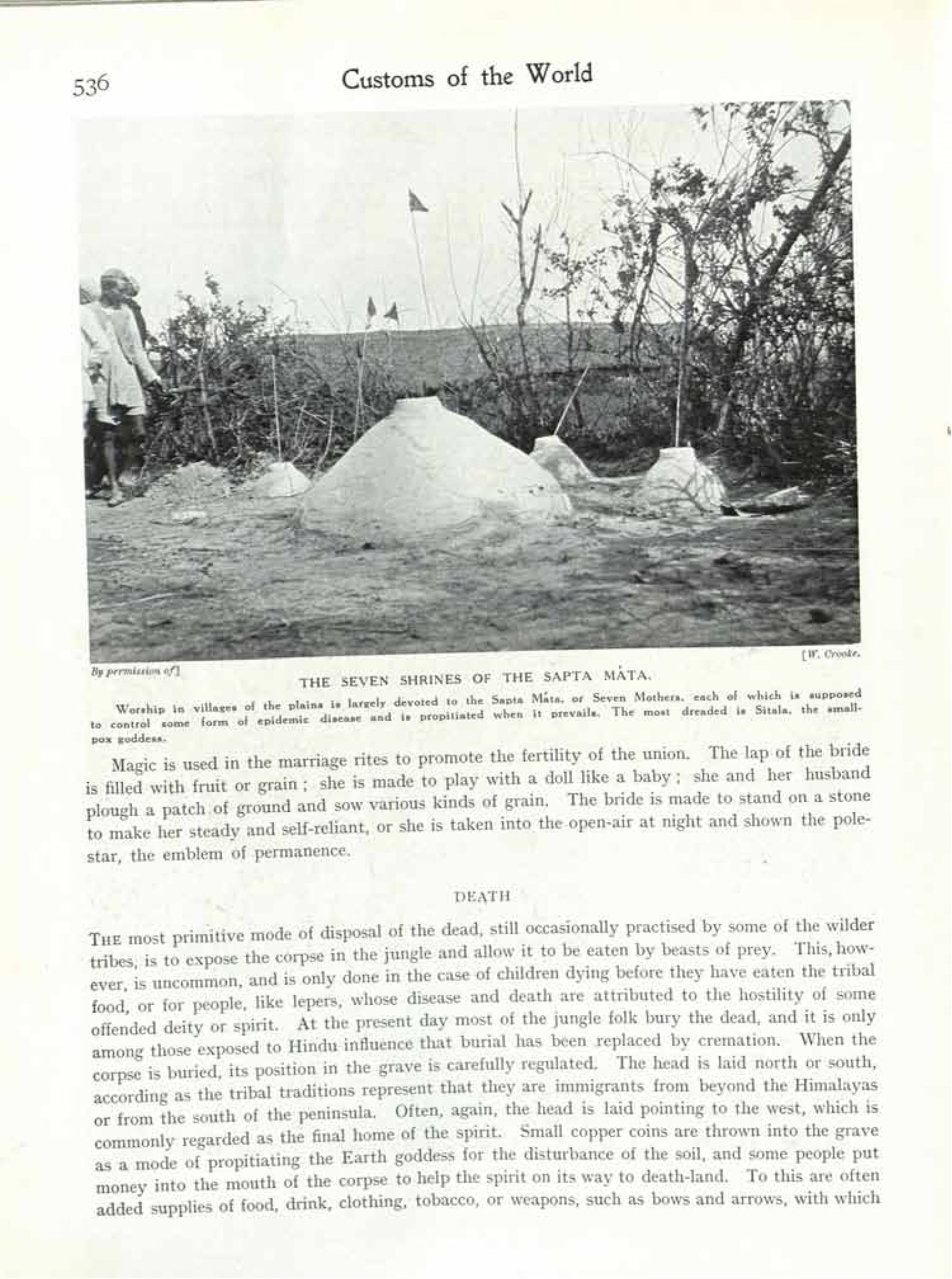
Photograph of the seven shrines of the Sapta Matas, including Shitala, printed in 'Customs of the World' (1913)

The shrines are situated on the banks of ponds. The shrine itself are made of some bricks and have no regular priests.

The most important shrines at which large annual fairs are held are at the shrines of Seel village in Patiala and at the shrine of Jarg village in Ludhiana district.

Jarag fair is one of the important fairs of Punjab that is held in Jarg, a village in tehsil Pail and district Ludhiana. The fair is also known as Baheria Fair. It is organised in the month of Cheth (March–April), in the honor of the Seetla Mata. On the day of the fair, the devotees of Seetla Mata gather near the pond and scoop a portion of the earth to form a mound. The mound is revered as the shrine of the Goddess.

Prayers and pujas are conducted at the Jarg Fair. Sweet gulgula (jaggery cakes) are made one day prior to the fair and offered to the Goddess on the day of fair. The sweets are then offered to the donkeys, which are the favorite of the Goddess. Donkeys are specially decorated for the occasion, with potters cladding them in attractive colorful blankets. Some even put bells or conch shells and beads around their neck.

Temporary stalls are set up and the fair hosts cultural programmes.

== Punjabi folk cosmology ==
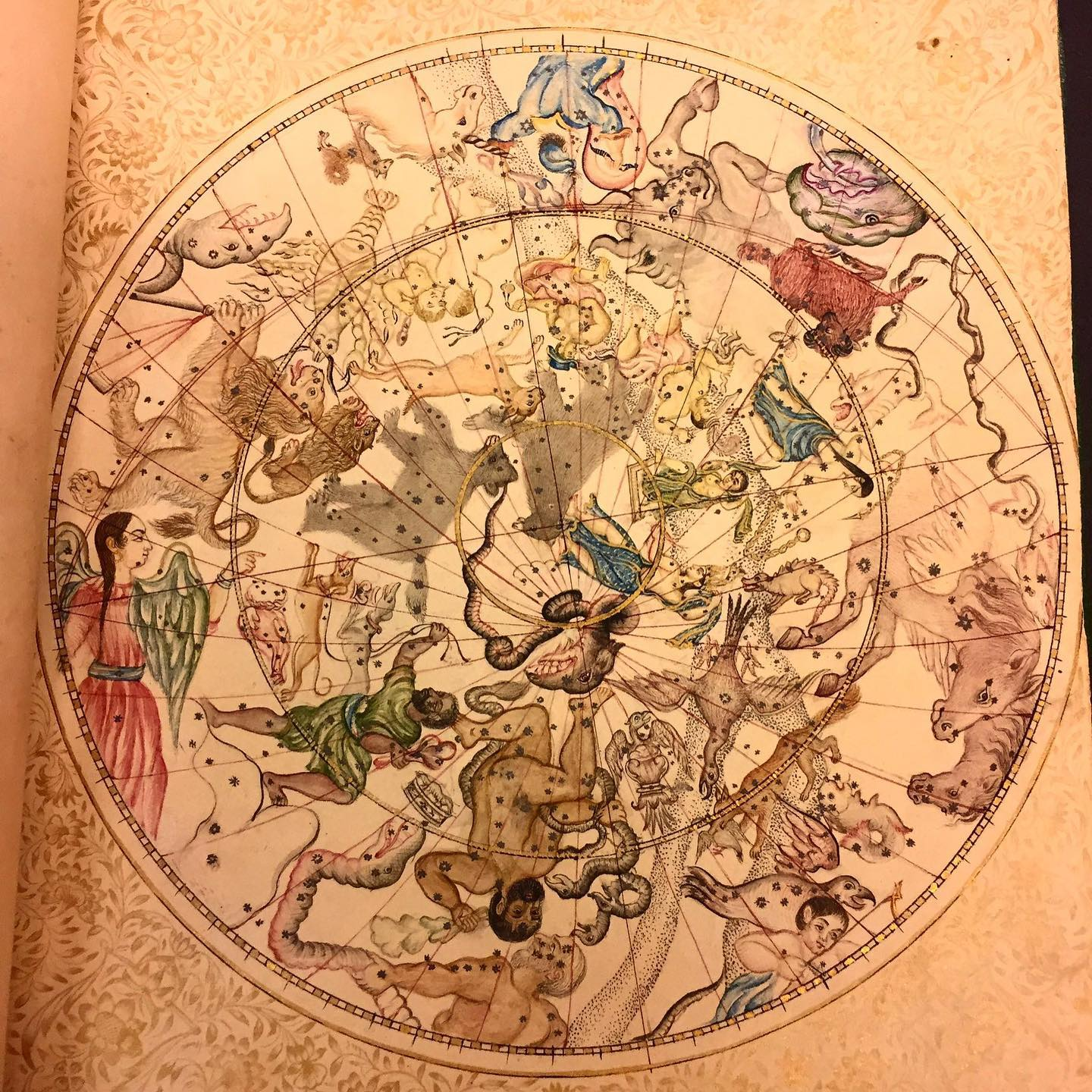
Anthropomorphic images of constellations, painting from a folio of the work Sarvasiddhāntatattva-cuḍāmaṇi ("The Jewel of the Essence of All Sciences"), 1840

Bhatti and Michon (2004), in their article Folk Practice in Punjab, published in the Journal of Punjab Studies by the University of California, believe that in Punjabi folk cosmology, the universe is divided into three realms:

English	Punjabi	Inhabitants
Sky	Akash	Dev Lok (Angels)
Earth	Dharti	Matlok (Humans)
Underworld	Nagas	Naglok (Serpents)

Devlok is the realm of the gods, saints and ancestors, existing in akash, the sky. Ancestors can become gods or saints.

== Punjabi ancestral worship ==
=== Jathera—ancestral shrines ===
According to Thapliyal (1979), the practice of ancestor-worship in India was introduced by the Kushans, who themselves had adopted it from the Chinese. As a result, the cult of Devaputra ("son of heaven") formed in the subcontinent, where small-shrines, known as Devakulas, arose that were dedicated to ancestors (pitrs), however this ancestor-veneration was admonished by the Brahmins.

Jats, a large group of former nomads, had begun to turn to settled agriculture around the thirteenth century in central Punjab, facilitated by region's fertility and the use of the Persian water wheel. They brought with them their own beliefs centered on the worship of deities like Sakhi Sarwar and Gugga Pir, as well as their own independent social customs like widow remarriage and reverence for clan leaders, or vaderas, while building relationships with settled society, though often placed in the lower rungs of caste society. The Jats had a long-standing social tradition of egalitarianism.

Jhalli jathera shrine in village Dumeli near Hoshiarpur

Their institution of jatheras and the veneration of vaderas and folk figures exist at the boundaries of the major organized religions of the region, coexisting comfortably alongside religious identities, and adding to Punjabi cultural identity, continuing to thrive and not fitting neatly into any clearly delineated, reified categories. A jathera may classified broadly into different types: founders (usually of a village), ancestors (often common-ancestors of a clan), martyrs (shahids), heroes, or anyone accomplished in some way or manner (jogis, sidhs, pirs, and bhagats). Martyrs (shahid) are not to be confused with bir, which is a victim that died a violent death. Jatheras can also be women. Amongst the Jats, it is common for a jathera to be venerated on the occasion of weddings and marriages (biah or shadi), which is known as Jathera Manuana, to win over the jathera's favour. These shrines can be found across the fields of Punjab, although there is usually a large one dedicated to a particular common-ancestor of a clan. Villages tend to have a shrine dedicated to the founder of the village. The jathera shrines usually consist of mound of dirt or small masonry platform under a pipal tree. The local zamindar traditionally would venerate the jathera once annually. A ceremony known as Bhumiya (for the local village-deity) or Jathera ka Puja (for the jathera) is observed on the 15th day on a monthly basis, every Sunday, and on the occasions of births and marriages.

Some jatheras and the principal clan associated with them are as follows:

- Jogi Pir (Chahals)
- Sidh Bhoi (Dhaliwals)
- Gaggowahna and Raja Karn (Dhillons)
- Baba Alho/Alla (Grewals)
- Raja Ram and Raja Pir (Gills)
- Sidhsan (Randhawas)
- Tilkara (Sidhus)
- Kala Mihr (Sandhus)
- Baba Manga (Bajwas)
- Yar Pir Bhurawala (Bhullars)

The veneration of jathera is prevalent amongst Hindu and Sikh Jats. Despite jathera worship not being sanctioned in orthodox Sikhism (an injunction against the practice was made by Guru Gobind Singh), the practice continues amongst rural Sikhs. Some jathera shrines, such as that of Kala Mehar, have attempted to adopt elements of Sikh iconography/symbolism (such as being built to resemble a gurdwara) and other Sikh aspects to remain on the margins of the religion and become more acceptable to the population as a result, despite folk religion being in a state of "strained co-existence" with mainstream, institutionalized religion. Jatheras tended to be men who were shaheeds (religious-martyrs) or accomplished in some manner (sidh). Their worship-spot is marked by a mound of dirt, which may evolve into a proper shrine. During wedding-customs, it is common for the bridegroom to venerate his clan's jathera by bowing his head at their consecrated location and walk circumambulating the spot, with an offering be given to both a Brahmin and lagi (menial at wedding). A jathera is based on lineage, not village, thus a village may have more than one jathera for each lineage inhabiting it.

Most gotras worship ancestors as their kula deva/devī. They often use kinship terms like dādī (paternal grandmother) or bābā (male ancestor). Some groups have specific names. For the Nāhar, the dādīs are called Cai, Ammā, and Bīnī-Śabīnī, while the bābās include Vinjhal, Balak-Pittar, and Ram-saran. Unique to Punjab are cases like the Lohrā and Barar gotras, who worship a male who died in an accidental death as a child as a bābā. In the Bhābhū gotra, a couple (Dādā Kālu and Dādī Viro) who died fighting Mughal armies to protect the clan are enshrined. In these cases, the deceased becomes a protective guardian rather than a malevolent spirit. The practice can also be found amongst Punjabi Jains.

==== Practice ====
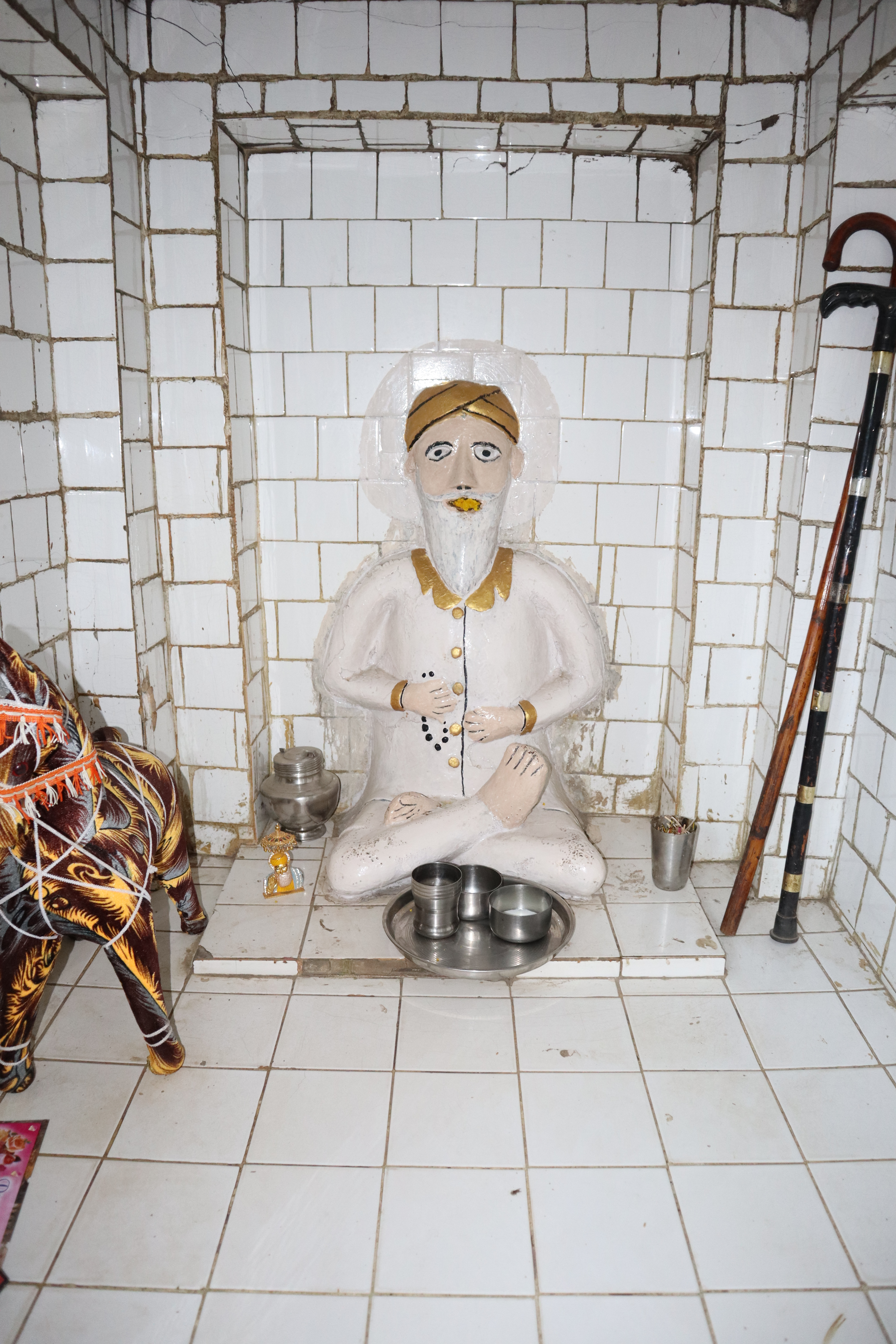
Photograph of an idol located within a Punjabi folk religion shrine of Baba Sidh in Chugawan village, Moga district, Punjab, India, April 2023

According to Bhatti and Michon (2004), a jathera is a shrine constructed to commemorate and show respect to the founding common ancestor of a surname and all subsequent common clan ancestors. Whenever a founder of a village dies, a shrine is raised to him on the outskirts of the village and a jandi tree is planted there. A village may have many such shrines.

The jathera can be named after the founder of the surname or the village. However, many villages have unnamed jathera. In some families, the founder of the jathera is also a saint. In such instances, the founder has a dual role of being the head of a jathera (who is venerated by his descendants) and also of being a saint (such as Baba Jogi Pir; who can be worshipped by any one).

Punjabi people believe that members of a surname all hail from one common ancestor. A surname in Punjabi is called a gaut or gotra.

Members of a surname are then subdivided into smaller clans comprising related members who can trace their family tree. Typically, a clan represents people related within at least seven generations but can be more.

In ancient times, it was normal for a village to comprise members of one surname. When people moved to form a new village, they continued to pay homage to the founding jathera. This is still the case for many people who may have new jathera in their villages but still pay homage to the founding ancestor of the entire surname.

Over time, Punjabi villages changed their composition whereby families from different surnames came to live together. A village therefore can have one jathera which can be communally used by members of different surnames but has the founder of the village as the named ancestor or many jathera can be built to represent the common ancestors of specific surnames.

When members of a clan form a new village, they continue to visit the jathera in the ancestral village. If this is not possible, a link is brought from the old jathera to construct a new jathera in the new village.

People visit the jathera when getting married, the 15th of the Indian month and sometimes on the first Sunday of an Indian month. The descendants of the elder go to a pond and dig earth and make shivlinga and some put it on the mound of their jathera and offer ghee and flowers to the Jathera.So, It is a form of shivlinga puja also. In some villages it is customary to offer flour.

== Shrines ==
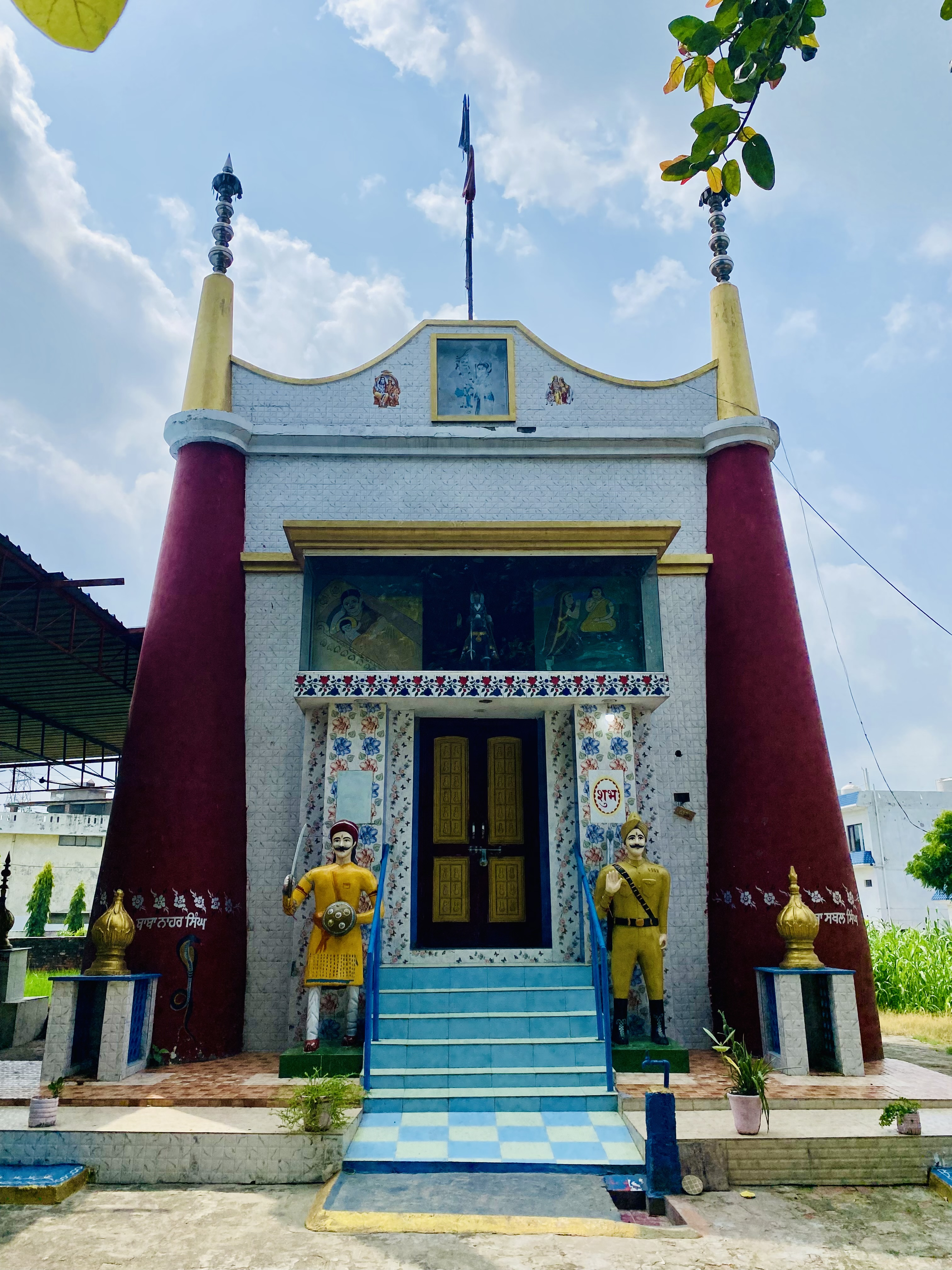
Gugga Peer, Raipur Mandlan, Patiala district, Punjab, India

Bhatti (2000) states that there are shrines dedicated to various saints, gods and goddesses in Punjab which he has studied by reference to Punjabi folk religion. These include Sakhi Sarwar, Seetla Mata and Gugga. There are many shrines which represent the folk practices of the Punjab region. Snehi (2015) states that such shrines represent a discourse between different organised religions.

According to Singh and Gaur (2009), these shrines represent inter-communal dialogue and a distinct form of cultural practice of saint veneration. Rouse (1988) regards pirs as the folk-religion representatives and fakirs as the caretakers of shrines. These categories are discussed in an Islamic context. Weekes (1984) discussing Islam states that:

- "Punjabi folk religion weaves a rich variety of local mysticism — such as beliefs in the evil eye, the predictions of astrologers and the potency of amulets and potions — into the scriptural, universalizing traditions of Islam propounded by the ulama."

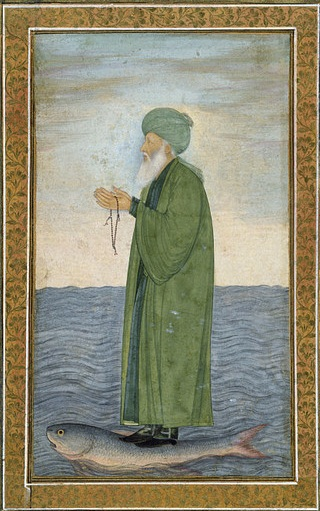
Al-Khidr, who stands on a fish

Various other saints are also venerated in Punjab such as Khawaja Khidr is a river spirit of wells and water streams. He is mentioned in the Sikandar-nama as the saint who presides over the well of immortality, and is revered by many faiths. He is sometimes pictured as an old man dressed in green, and is believed to ride upon a fish. His principal shrine is on an island of the Indus River by Bhakkar in Punjab, Pakistan. Gugga Pir is a hero-deity from whom protection against snakebites is sought. He is one of an array of heroic, martial, and saintly figures of the region venerated for folk purposes. The fair known as Chhapar Mela is organised annually.

Many villages in Punjab, India and Pakistan, have shrines of Sakhi Sarwar who is more popularly referred to as Lakha Data Pir. A shrine of Sakhi Sarwar is situated in district Dera Ghazi Khan in Punjab, of Pakistan, where an annual fair is held in March. A 9-day fair is organised every year in Mukandpur, Punjab, India.

Other shrines are in honour of Seetla Mata who is worshiped for protection against childhood diseases with notable fair being held annually in Ludhiana district and is known as the Jarag mela; Gorakhnath who was an 11th to 12th century Nath yogi and connected to Shaivism; and Puran Bhagat who is a revered saint in the Punjab region and other areas of the subcontinent. People visit Puran's well located in Sialkot, especially childless women travel from places as far as Quetta and Karachi.

In Punjab, the terms marhī or samādhi refers to a funerary monument.

== Punjabi occult ==
In Punjab, there is a belief in benevolent and malevolent spirits. Those who died a violent death (known as bir) and martyrs (known as shahid) may become malevolent spirits known in Punjab as birs, bhuts, baitals, prets, nuris, and churels, who haunt others. Benevolent spirits are known as paris, which are equivalent to the concept of fairies. There is also a belief in witches, with one type being the daans, with their feet pointed backwards, possessing inverted faces, and only attacking men.

== Organised religion versus folk practices ==
In 1708 whilst Guru Gobind Singh and his followers were travelling in Rajasthan on a missionary tour from Itmadpur to Chittaur, they set-up camp and rested in Naraina, where a Panj Piare quintet issued a gurmatta injunction against Guru Gobind Singh to pay 125 rupees for tilting an arrow from his forehead in the direction of the shrine of Dadu Dayal nearby as a mark of reverence (noticed as a transgression by Bhai Daya Singh), which was a test by the guru to see if his Sikhs understood that reverence of mausoleums are to be rejected. Guru Gobind Singh, pleased with the Sikhs for recognizing the perceived transgression, paid the injunction fee. In a verse found in the 33 Savaiye chapter of the Dasam Granth, it states that the veneration of tombs and mausoleums are to be shunned: Gor marhi mat bhul na manai ("worship not even by mistake [a] mausoleum or grave").

During the early 20th century, the Sikh, Muslim, and Hindu preachers and reformers were against Punjabi folk religion, deeming it as being antithetical to the tenets of organized religion and a continuation of "primordial superstition". During the Singh Sabha movement of the late 19th century, Punjabi folk religion was deemed as superstition, thus was shunned by the reformers. The Sikh reformers taught that women should shed any beliefs or practices rooted in Punjabi folk religion or else they were not good Sikhs. A woman-preacher of the Singh Sabha movement, named Bibi Devki, wrote literature in 1886 that condemned Punjabi folk religion, where in a fictional story a woman, characterized as a "bad" Sikh woman, proposes to her friend, who is an "ideal" Sikh woman, that they should pay a visit to the shrine of Heer to light lamps and pay respects. The friend refutes this idea as worshipping the dead and being against Sikh dharam. At the end of Vir Singh's novel 1898 Sundarī, he criticizes folk practices followed by women, believing it to be negatively impacting Sikhism but also due his concern of high-caste women emulating the practices of low-castes. Ditt Singh in 1902 wrote the tract Guggā Gapauṛā shunning the veneration of Gugga. Within the qissā genre, the influence of folk traditions lingered on for longer as per Farina Mir in regards to pir veneration. As per Harjot Oberoi regarding the impact of the Singh Sabha movement:

... most Sikhs moved in and out of multiple identities grounded in local, regional, religious, and secular realities. Consequently, the boundaries between what could be seen as the Sikh “great” and “little” traditions were highly blurred: several competing definitions of who constituted a Sikh were possible ... [this] older pluralist paradigm of Sikh faith was displaced forever and replaced by a highly uniform Sikh identity, the one we know today as modern Sikhism.

— Harjot Singh Oberoi, Construction of Religious Boundaries, Quoted by Anne Murphy

In the late 1980s and early 1990s, some radical Sikh youth destroyed the shrines of many Punjabi folk deities, however they were soon reconstructed. Many reformist and orthodox Sikhs are against ascribing miracles to Sikh religious figures and making pilgrimages to and conducting veneration of sants at their samadh, believing such veneration should be conducted at a proper gurdwara, due to their claim that grave-veneration is against Sikh tenets. Despite regular suppression from organized religions, Punjabi folk religion is now growing in influence, with the shrines of folk deities and ancestors becoming more elaborate and grand. Worship of Gugga has continued as an aspect of Punjabiyat.

== See also ==
- Folk religion
- Elite religion
- Punjabi folklore
- Punjabi folk music
- Saat Behna (seven sister goddesses)

== Gallery ==
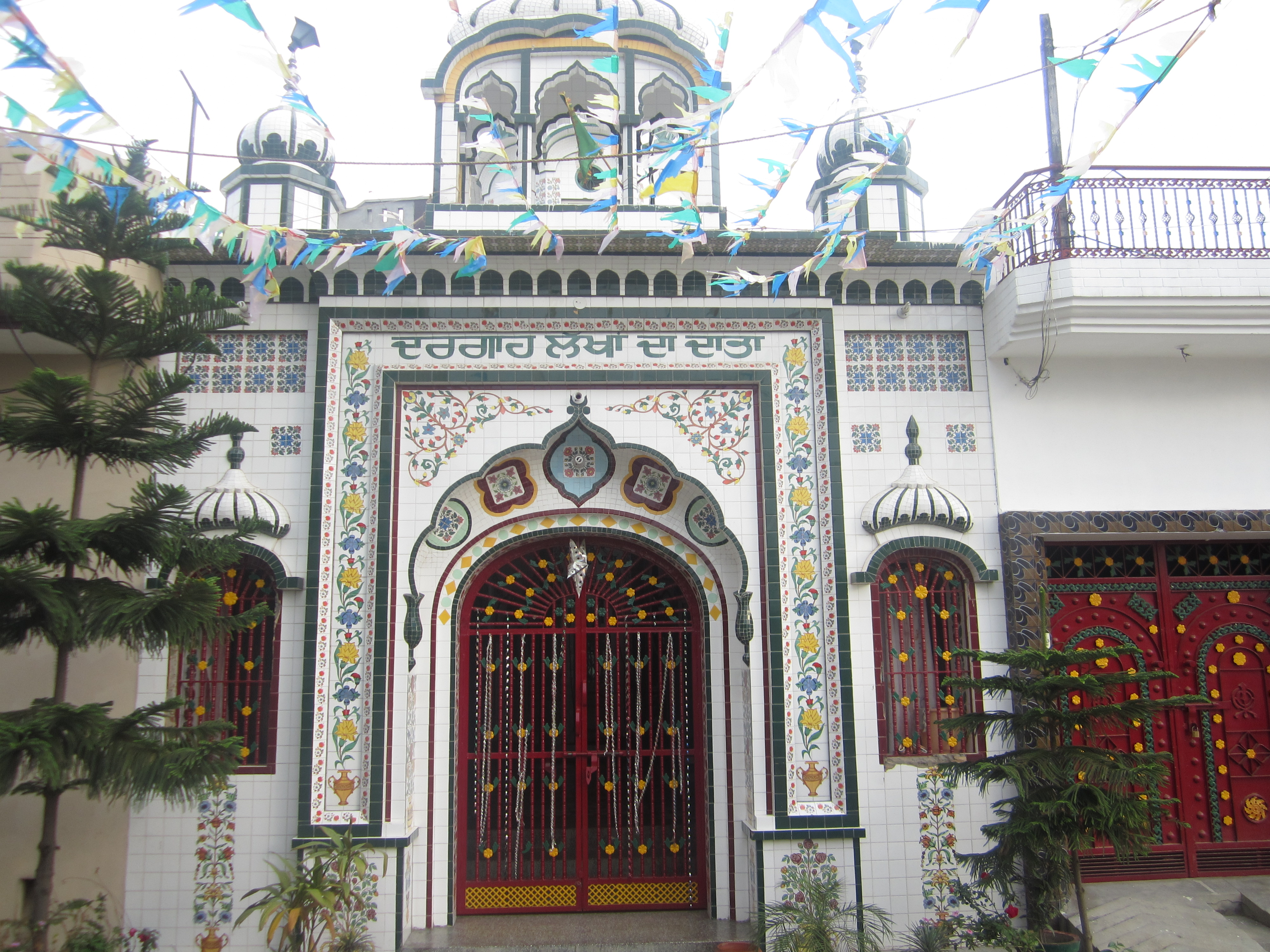
Lakh Data shrine of Sakhi Sarwar, Jalandhar District

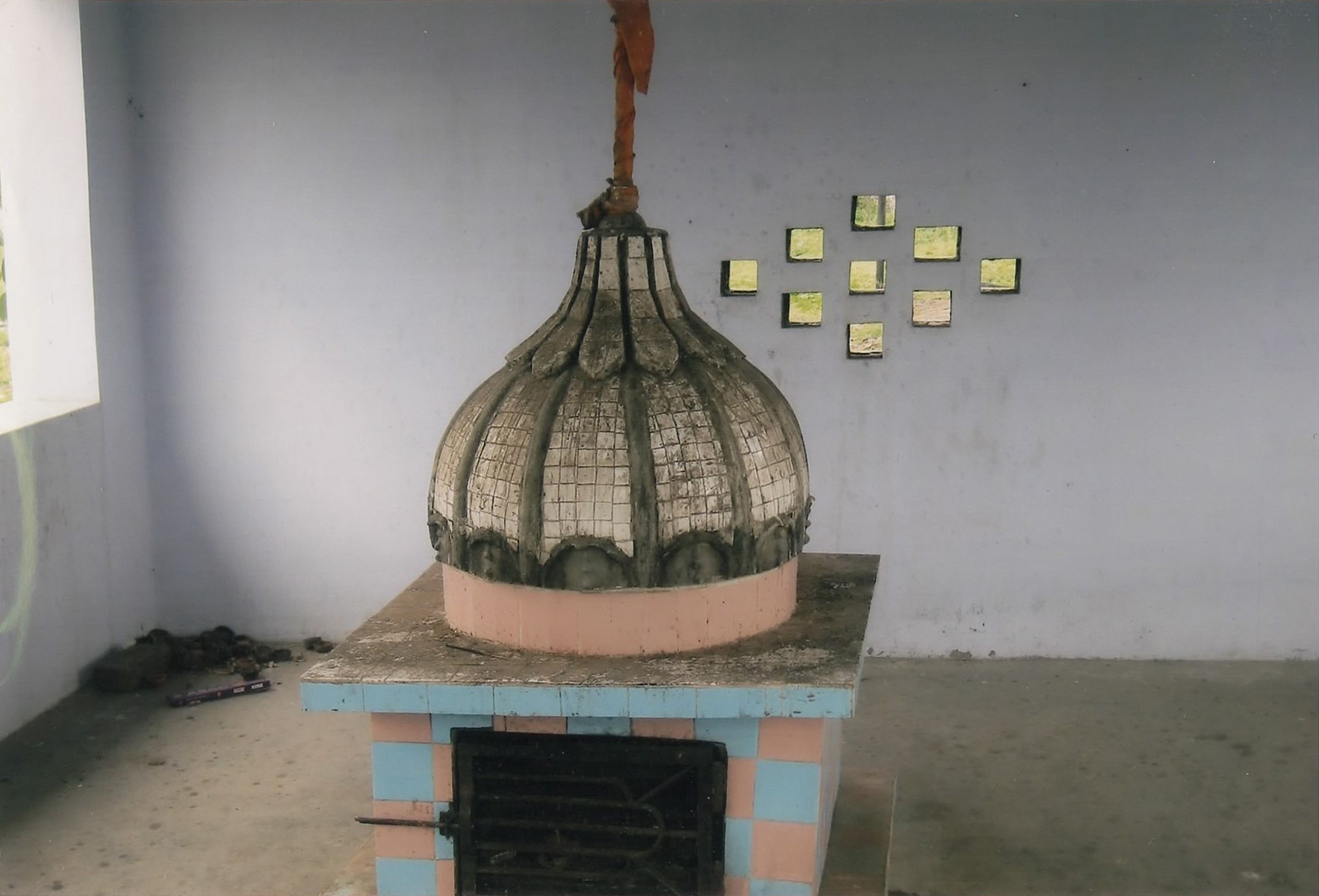
Masani shrine, Talhan, Jalandhar

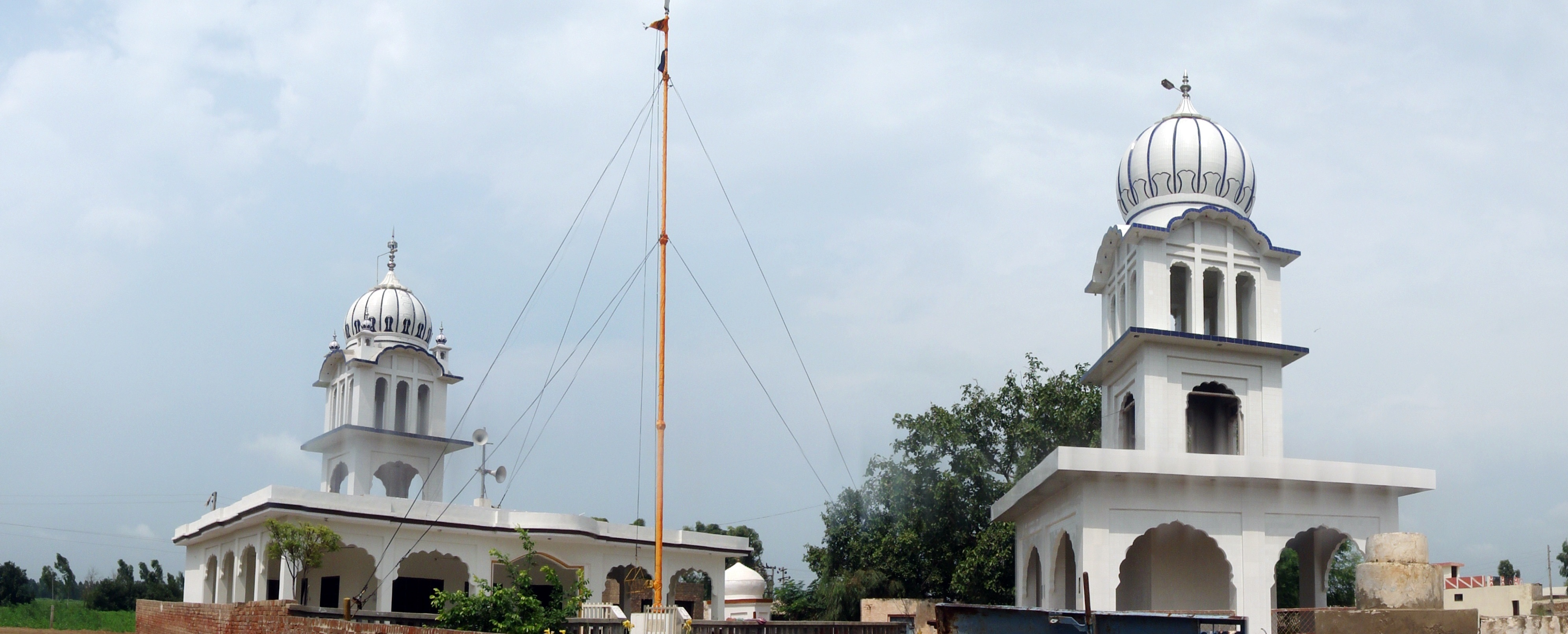
Baba Bala samadh, Ghuriana

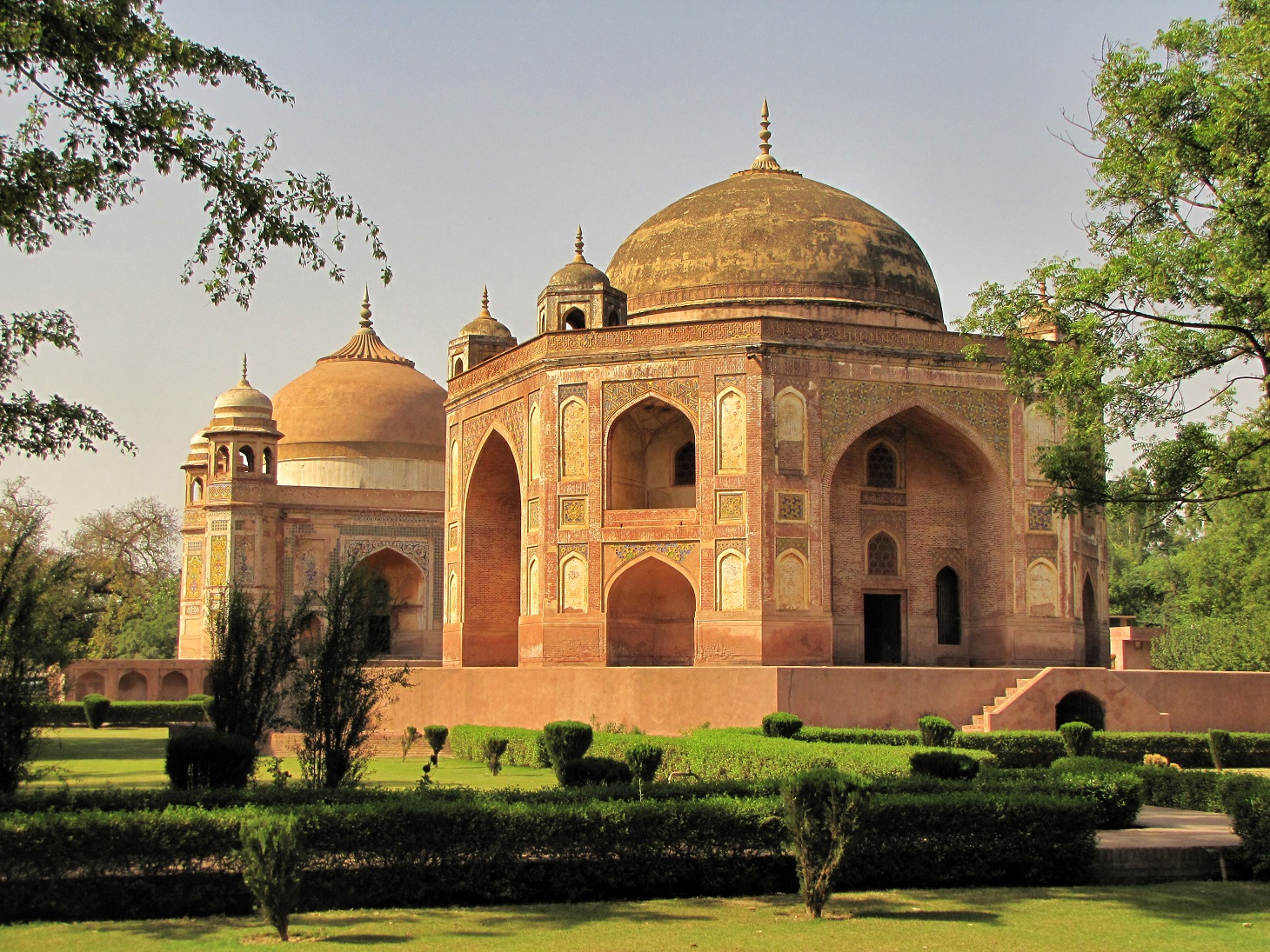
Tombs of Ustad in Nakodar

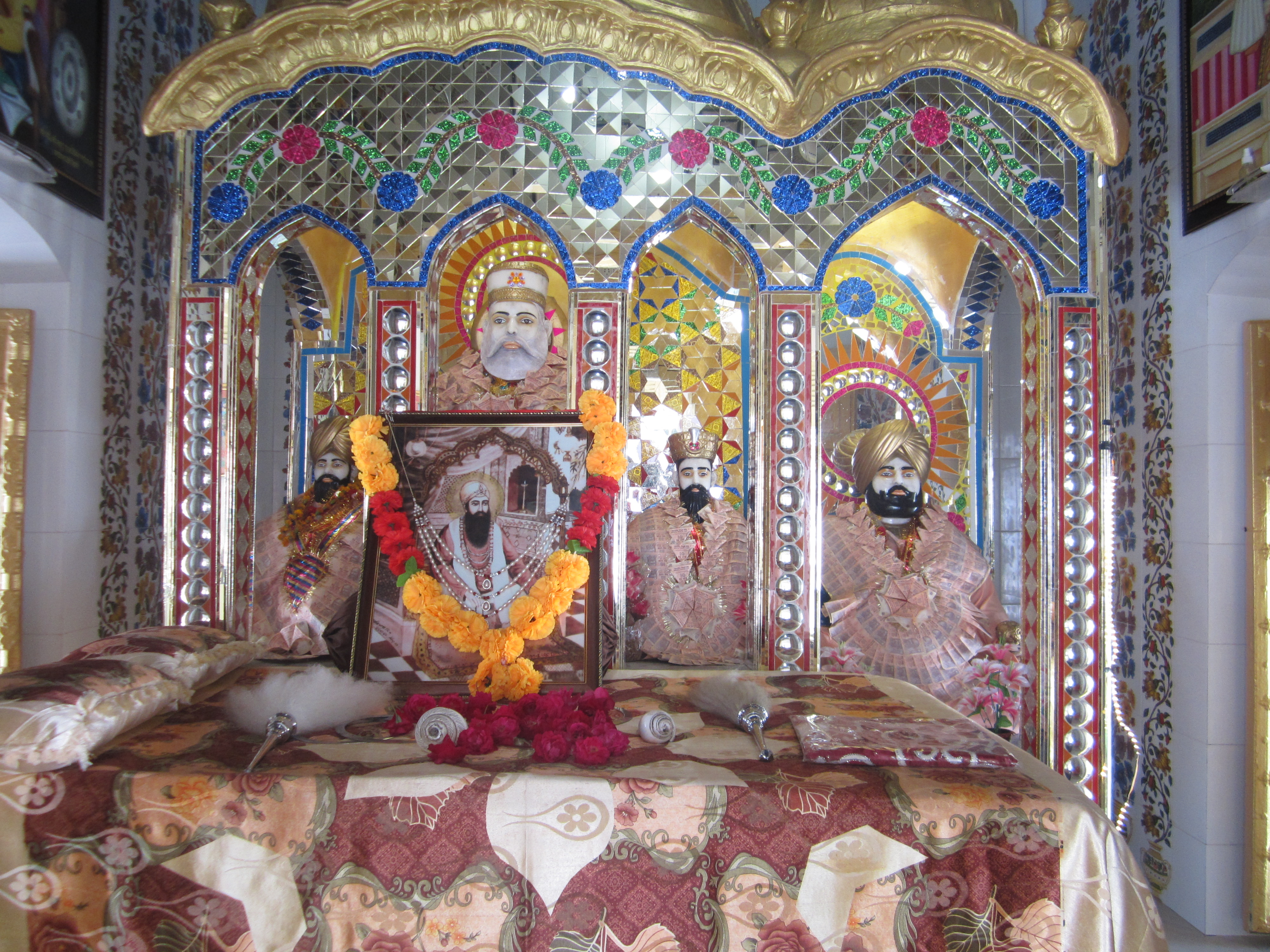
Guru Bhag Singh Kartarpur Punjab India (Vadbhag)

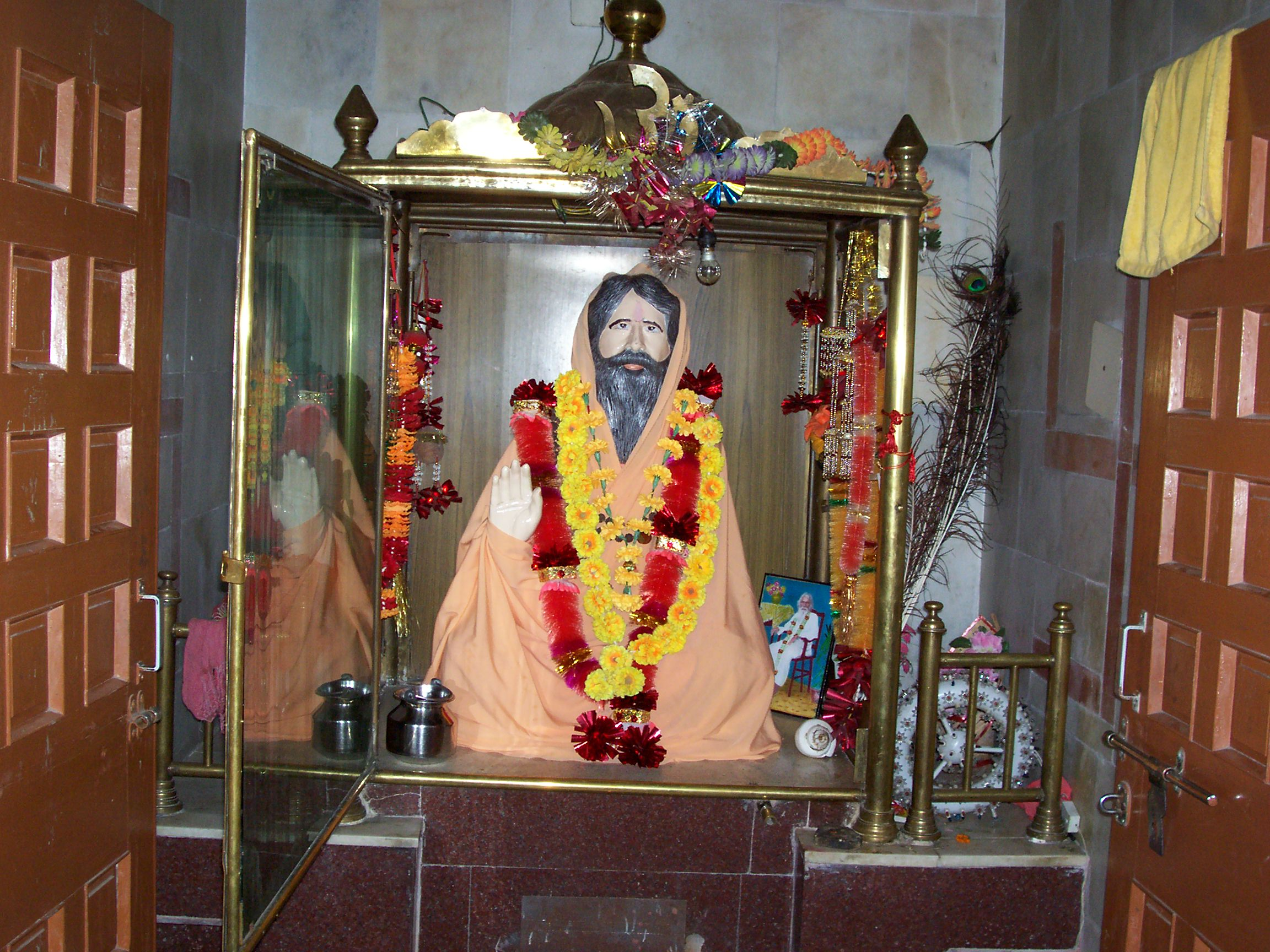
Swami Sarvanand Giri

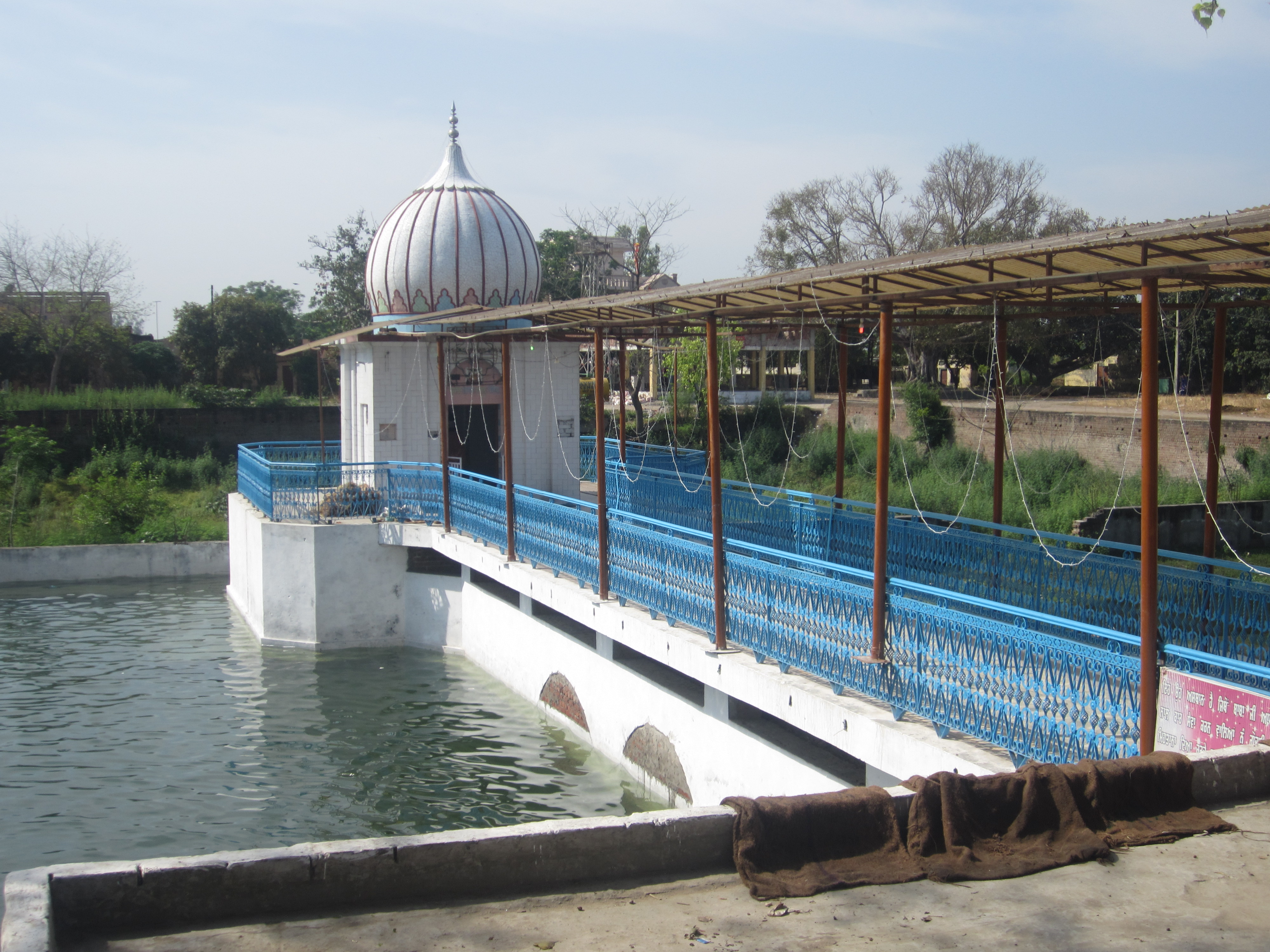
Bhagat Baba Kalu Ji Panchhat

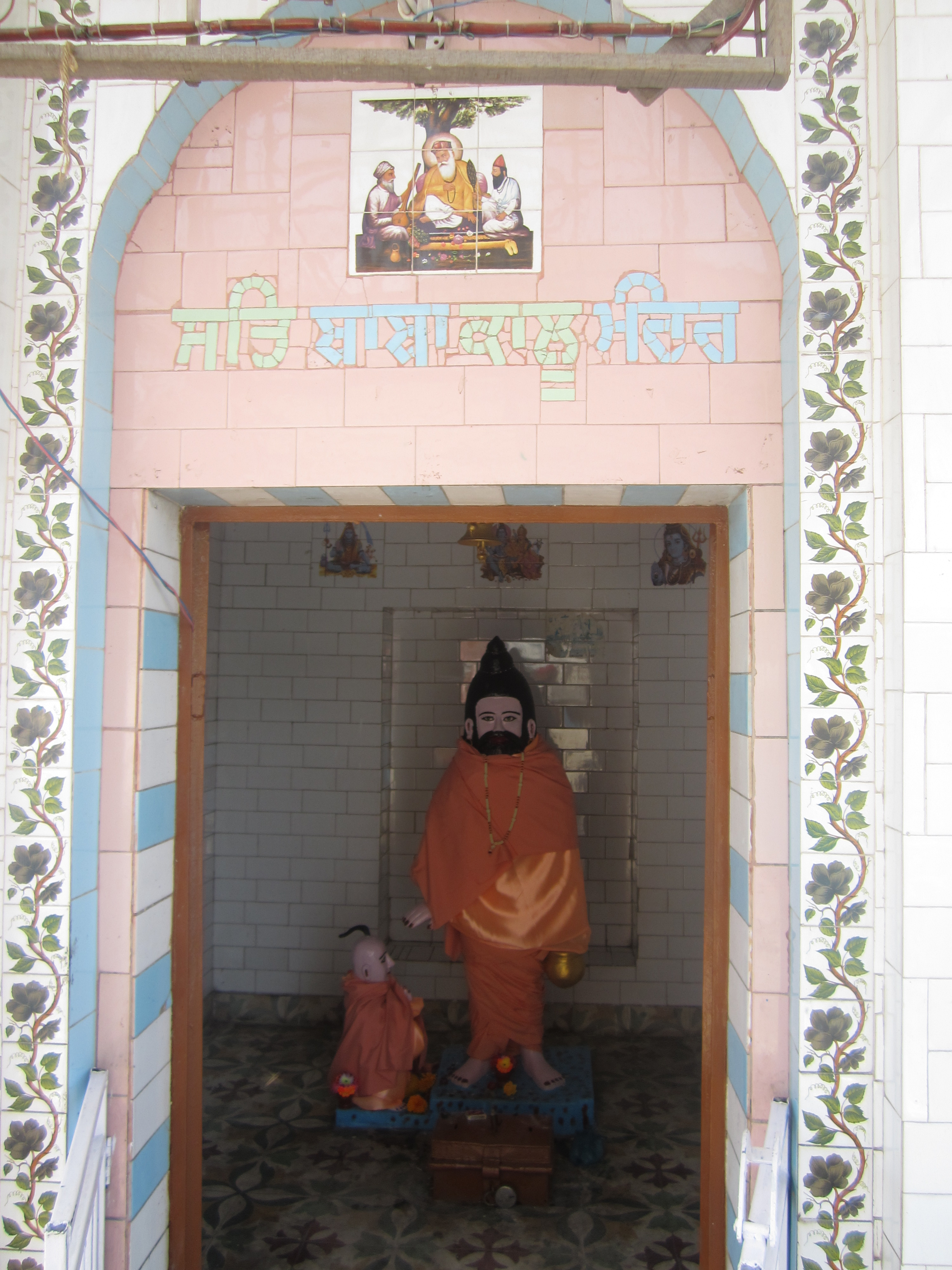
Bhagat Baba Kalu Ji Panchhat

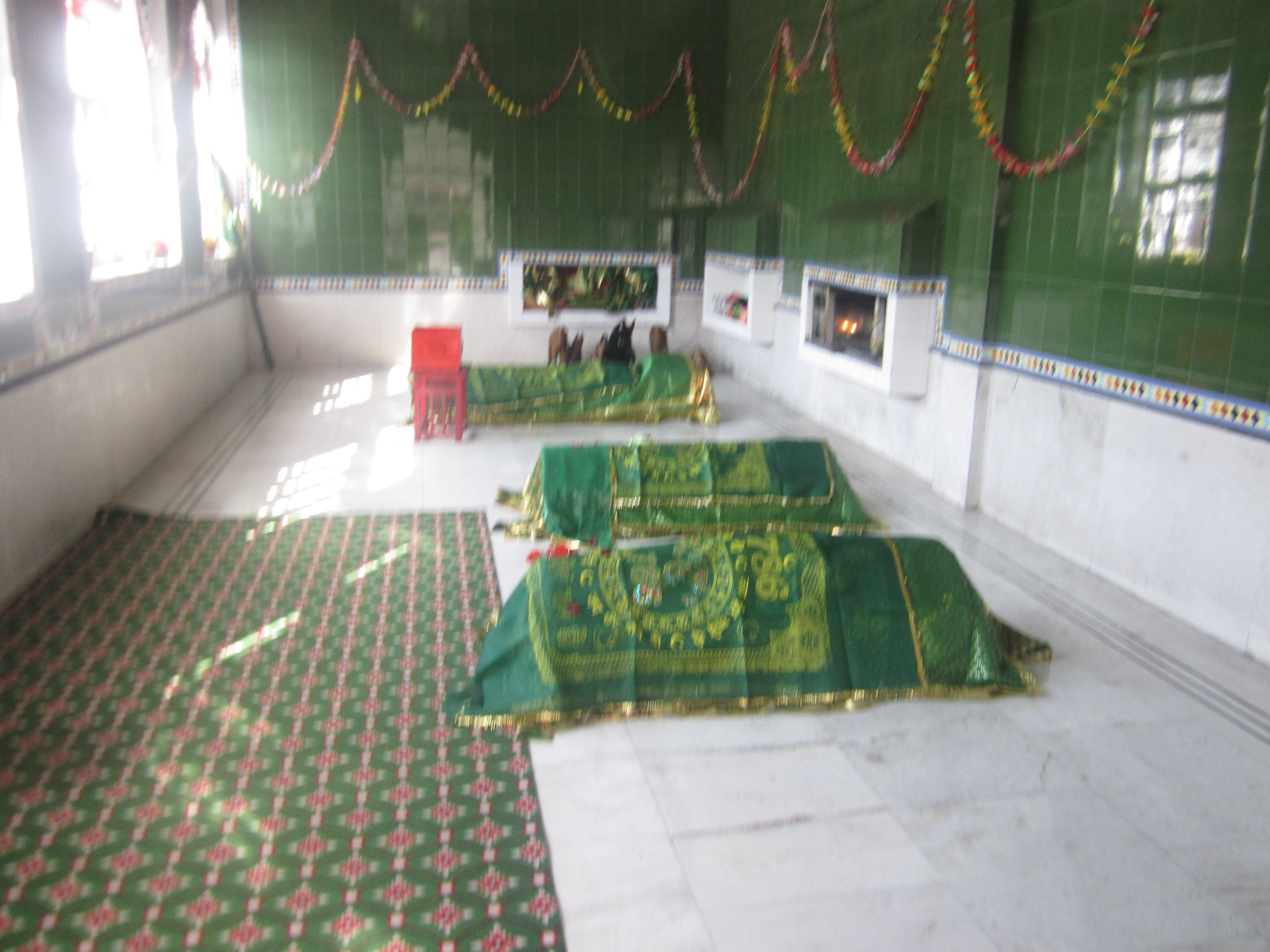
Shrine Baba Budda Ji Nakodar

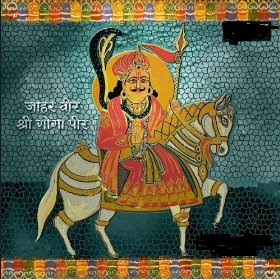
VeerGogaji
