= Manuke, Ludhiana district =

Village on Guru Gobind Singh Marg, Punjab, India

Manuke
- Town

Māṇūkē transcription(s)
- Location in Punjab, India Manuke (India)
- Coordinates: 30.675°N 75.456°E
- Country: India
- State: Punjab
- District: Ludhiana
- Founder: Guru Gobind Singh
- Named for: Baba Manuu

Government
  - Type: Panchayat
- Elevation: 231 m (758 ft)

Population (2010)
  - Total: 9,048

Punjabi
  - Official: Punjabi
- Time zone: UTC+5:30 (IST)
- PIN: 142034
- Vehicle registration: PB-10

Manuke is a village in Ludhiana district, Punjab, India. Gurdwara Patshahi Dasvee, a gurdwara (Sikh temple) there, is believed to have been visited by Guru Gobind Singh. The guru was travelling from Lammāṅ Jaṭpurā towards Dina Kangar in December 1705, with him resting under a pipal tree which still exists at the back of the gurdwara. A Manji Sahib (small, domed-room) commemorating the guru's short stay was constructed in 1923. Later-on the site was transformed into a proper Sikh gurdwara through later constructions and renovations.
