= Dhaunkal =

Town in Punjab, Pakistan

Dhaunkal دھونکل
- Town
- Location of Dhaunkal Dhaunkal (Pakistan)
- Coordinates: 32°24′18″N 74°08′13″E
- Country: Pakistan
- Province: Punjab
- District: Wazirabad
- Tehsil: Wazirabad
- Number of Union Councils: 1
- Municipal status: 1981

Area
  - Total: 1.9 sq mi (5 km^{2})

Population
  - Estimate (2017): 19,871
- Time zone: UTC+5 (PST)
  - Summer (DST): +5
- Postal code type: 52010
- Calling code: 0556

Dhaunkal (Urdu, Punjabi دھونکل) is a town and union council in Wazirabad Tehsil, Wazirabad District, Punjab, Pakistan. It is located on the Lahore-Islamabad Highway, only 0.5 kilometers from the district capital, Wazirabad and about 15 kilometres from Gujrat. Dhaunkal is one of the biggest and oldest towns in Wazirabad Tehsil. The population of Dhaunkal is 25,000, of which 10,000 are registered to vote. Due to access to transportation, it is possible to get to Dhaunkal from all over Pakistan within 24 hours because of the access through the NHA roads.

== Clans ==
There are several main clans -Arrain, Naqvi, Klair, Jovindah, Jalib, Awan, Cheema, Warraich, Rehmani, Sandhu, Rajpoot, Bhatti and Sheikh, which own almost 3,600 acres and 10 marlas of land. Rice and wheat cultivation and the raising of cattle - water buffaloes and cows - are the primary agricultural activities. Dhaunkal's principal natural resources are arable land and water. About 75% of Dhaunkal's total land area is under cultivation, and it is serviced by a large irrigation system made up of canals.

== Religion ==
Back view of Shrine of Sakhi Sarwar

Dhaunkal is famous as Sakhi Sarwar di Nagri (Sakhi Sarwar's town). 95% of its population is Muslim. Christians make up the remaining 5%, who have their own church and complete freedom of their rights. Sikhs and Hindus migrated due to partition and communal riots before August 15, 1947.

=== Sufi Saints in Dhaunkal ===
- Chilla Gaah of Sakhi Sarwar Sayyed Ahmed Sultan, Lakkh Data Deewan Lala Wali Sarkar
- The shrine of Syed Shah Sawwar is located near the Chilla Gaah of Sakhi Sarwar.
- Pir Syed Sardar Shah Badshah is a Majzoob Sufi saint whose shrine is also in Dhaunkal.

== Places ==
- Judicial Complex Wazirabad
- Wazirabad Cardiology Hospital
- Many CNG stations and petrol pumps
- Rural Health Centre
- Union Council Offices
- Water Supply Office
- Pakistan Post Office
- Pakistan Railway Station
- Superior group of colleges Wazirabad campus
- 3 Banks with ATM
- Govt boys high school
- Govt girls high school
- 4 Govt primary schools
- Private schools
- Cricket and Football grounds
- Dhaunkal railway station

== Villages of Dhaunkal Union Council ==
- Jandiala Dhabwala
- Dadwali
- Chak Baig
- Siranwali
- Borre Wali
- Nawan Pind
- Kot Hussain
- Kot Fazal Ahmed

== Climate ==
The climate of Dhaunkal changes quite drastically through the year. The summer periods last from June through September when the temperature reaches 36-42 degrees Celsius. The coldest months are usually November to February. The temperature can drop to seven degrees Celsius. The highest precipitation months are usually July and August when the monsoon season hits Punjab Province. During the other months the average rainfall is roughly 25 mm. The driest months are usually November through April, when little rainfall is seen.

Climate data for Dhaunkal
Month	Jan	Feb	Mar	Apr	May	Jun	Jul	Aug	Sep	Oct	Nov	Dec	Year
Mean daily maximum °C (°F)	19.0 (66.2)	22.0 (71.6)	27.0 (80.6)	33.0 (91.4)	39.0 (102.2)	39.0 (102.2)	35.0 (95.0)	35.0 (95.0)	34.0 (93.2)	32.0 (89.6)	27.0 (80.6)	21.0 (69.8)	30.8 (87.4)
Mean daily minimum °C (°F)	6.0 (42.8)	11.0 (51.8)	16.0 (60.8)	20.0 (68.0)	25.0 (77.0)	28.0 (82.4)	27.0 (80.6)	27.0 (80.6)	25.0 (77.0)	20.0 (68.0)	14.0 (57.2)	9.0 (48.2)	17.8 (64.0)
Average precipitation mm (inches)	18.0 (0.71)	35.0 (1.38)	24.0 (0.94)	13.0 (0.51)	17.0 (0.67)	48.0 (1.89)	82.0 (3.23)	87.0 (3.43)	43.0 (1.69)	9.0 (0.35)	11.0 (0.43)	12.0 (0.47)	628.8 (24.76)
Mean monthly sunshine hours	220.1	217.5	244.9	276	306.9	270	226.3	235.6	267	291.4	261	223.2	3,039.9
Source: My Weather2

== Sports ==
- Dhaunkal Stars Cricket Club was established in 2001
- Sakhi Sarwar Cricket Club Dhaunkal. Sakhi Sarwar cricket club is the first cricket club of Dhaunkal which affiliated with the Pakistan cricket board
- Ch Zubair registered with the Pakistan Cricket Board in 1999
- Dhaunkal United Cricket Club was established in 2023
- Sakhi Sarwar Football Club Dhaunkal
- Dhaunkal star junior football club Dhaunkal
- Badminton teams
