= Aratus (mythology) =

Son of Asclepius in Greek mythology

Aratus (Ancient Greek: Ἄρατος) was in Greek mythology the son of the god Asclepius and the mortal Sicyonian woman Aristodeme. He was half-brother to Aceso, Aegle, Hygieia, Iaso, Panacea, Machaon, Podalirius, and Telesphoros.

Literary evidence of Aratus's parentage largely comes via references from one single author, the geographer Pausanias. However, there are other remnants, such as an inscription dating from the second or third century BCE and unearthed in the city of Epidaurus that reads: "[We] set up this dragon, the monstrous father of the hero Aratus, to be guardian of possessions."

It is unclear to what extent Aratus as the son of Asclepius was an existing mythological tradition and to what extent it was a post-hoc mythologizing of Aratus of Sicyon after his death.
