= Panacea (medicine) =

Supposed universal remedy

A panacea (/pænəˈsiːə/) is any supposed remedy that is claimed to cure all diseases and/or prolong life indefinitely. Named after the Greek goddess of universal remedy, Panacea, it was sought by medieval alchemists in connection with the elixir of life and the philosopher's stone, a mythical substance that would enable the transmutation of common metals into gold. Medieval panaceas could be simple natural remedies, or complicated concoctions of up to hundreds of ingredients. After Europe came into contact with the Americas, there was renewed hope of finding a panacea among the plants and herbs native to the New World. Through the 18th and 19th centuries, many "patent medicines" were claimed to be panaceas, and they became very popular through controversial advertising. The term "panacea" is now also used in a negative way to describe the overuse of any one solution to solve many different problems, especially in medicine. The word has acquired connotations of snake oil and quackery.

A panacea (or panaceum) is also a literary term to represent any solution to solve all problems related to a particular issue.

== Mythology ==
In Greek mythology, Panacea was one of the daughters of the Greek god of medicine Asclepius, along with her four sisters, each of whom performed one aspect of health care:

- Panacea (the goddess of the cure)
- Hygieia ("Hygiene", the goddess of cleanliness, and sanitation)
- Iaso (the goddess of recuperation from illness)
- Aceso (the goddess of the healing process)
- Aglæa/Ægle (the goddess of beauty and splendor)

According to the mythology, Panacea had an elixir or potion with which she was able to heal any human malady, and her name has become interchangeable with the name of the cure itself.

== History ==
=== Ancient medicine ===
Ancient Greek and Roman scholars described various kinds of plants that were called panacea or panaces, such as Opopanax sp., Centaurea sp., Levisticum officinale, Achillea millefolium and Echinophora tenuifolia.

The Cahuilla people of the Colorado Desert region of California used the red sap of the elephant tree (Bursera microphylla) as a panacea.

Traditional Chinese medicine used ginseng widely as a cure-all, reflected by the Latin genus name Panax (or "panacea").

=== Medieval medicine ===
In Medieval Europe, most physicians and practitioners used the Galenic system to diagnose patients, in which disease was believed to be caused by an imbalance in the bodily humors. The search for a panacea involved finding a cure that contained everything necessary to cure any imbalance, a perfect blend of many different humoral qualities. (The actual term "panacea" wasn't commonly used in the Medieval era to describe a cure-all, though the concept was very similar.)

Theriac was a popular medieval panacea used to treat infectious diseases like the Bubonic Plague. There were countless recipes for theriac, a treacle that could sometimes be composed of over 50 ingredients, including viper flesh.

Another example of a medieval panacea was balsam, also called balm. This resin was known for its ability to heal wounds, produce a strong vitalizing scent, and preserve dead bodies. German Benedictine abbess Hildegard of Bingen (1098-1179) wrote on the use of balm as a way to restore the moisture needed to sustain life, which she termed “viriditas.”

The English alchemist Roger Bacon (1219-1292) connected the search for a panacea with the search for a substance to turn base metal into gold. One medieval recipe to create a panacea included crushed-up gemstones and gold powder, distilled with a mixture of many other medical components for eight days.

==== Panaceas and the New World ====
After the Europeans made contact with the New World, there was renewed hope of finding a panacea among the many novel herbs and plants of the Americas. In 1581, the Dutch doctor Giles Everard (also known as Gilles Everaerts) published On the Panacea Herb [De herba panacea], a book that implied tobacco, then growing in popularity after its recent introduction to Europe, was the long-lost ancient panacea. A work attributed to him appeared in English in 1659, entitled Panacea; Or The Universal Medicine: Being a Discovery of the Wonderfull Vertues of Tobacco Taken in a Pipe, with Its Operation and Use Both in Physick and Chyrurgery. This was the first text to use the term "panacea" in a title. Because smoking tobacco was associated with the witchcraft and rituals of the Native Americans, some Europeans thought the effects of tobacco were signs of the evilness of its nature. However, many adopted tobacco as Native American physicians and healers recommended, using the herb's beneficial properties in leaf form to cure snake-bites, convulsions, headaches, open wounds, and epilepsy.

=== The rise of "patent medicines" ===
"The increase of ... patent medicines within the 19th century, is an evil over which the friends of science and humanity can never cease to mourn."

— House Report No. 52, 30th Congress, 2nd Session, 1849

In the 1590s, Bavarian alchemist Georg am Wald began to advertise his cure-all Amwaldina, the first to use the term panacea in reference to a purely alchemical cure. He used a secret process to alchemically produce sealed and stamped medallions called terra sigillata, selling them with the claim that they could cure 116 diseases.

This concept of a cure-all specifically created and marketed towards consumers became known as a "patent medicine" starting in the late 17th century. Some medicines found favour with royalty and were issued letters patent authorising the use of the royal endorsement in advertising. Eighteenth century England has been popularly referred to as the golden age of physic, due to the widespread availability and consumption of enormous amounts of proprietary medicines - many of which were principally laxatives but with the added claim that they purified the blood and so cured all manner of illness.

The first such preparation that is known to use the term "panacea" for promotion was Panacea of William Swaim, starting in 1820. Defending the use of that term later, he stated that it was often used "in the restricted sense of a remedy for a large class of diseases, and not in its literal and more comprehensive meaning." He started publishing pamphlets to promote it in 1822, and in 1824 he published a book with the title A Treatise on Swaim's Panacea; Being a Recent Discovery for the Cure of Scrofula or King's Evil, Mercurial Disease, Deep-Seated Syphilis, Rheumatism, and All Disorders Arising from a Contaminated or Impure State of the Blood. The Philadelphia Medical Society took particular exception, forming a committee to tackle quack medicines which reported that The Panacea was neither effective nor safe.

Touting these nostrums with implausible claims was one of the first major projects of the advertising industry. An early pioneer in the use of advertising to promote patent medicine was New York businessman Benjamin Brandreth, whose "Vegetable Universal Pill" eventually became one of the best-selling patent medicines in the United States. For fifty years Brandreth's name was a household word in the United States; the Brandreth pills were a purgative that allegedly cured many ills by purging toxins out of the blood, which he claimed was the cause of all maladies. In the absence of proof, Brandreth justified this claim by quoting scripture Leviticus 17:11: "The life of the flesh is in the blood." An advertisement from 1865 claimed that "By their use acute disease of every kind is cured. Perseverance will cure most chronic cases." They became so well known they received mention in Herman Melville's classic novel Moby-Dick.

Similarly, James Morison was a British quack-physician who sold "Hygeian Vegetable Universal Medicine", which were advertised as "A cure for all curable ills". Morrison established his own medical school, The British College of Health, which trained agents known as Hygeists to sell the pills. However, satirists were brutal in their attacks on the business and its gullible clients, with caricatures even showing people re-growing severed limbs.

Many other patent medicines made claims to cure implausibly wide-ranging conditions. An early nineteenth century advertisement for Daffy's Elixir said it was used for the following ailments: The Stone in Babies and Children; Convulsion fits; Consumption and Bad Digestives; Agues; Piles; Surfeits; Fits of the Mother and Vapours from the Spleen; Green Sickness; Children's Distempers, whether the Worms, Rickets, Stones, Convulsions, Gripes, King's Evil, Joint Evil or any other disorder proceeding from Wind or Crudities; Gout and Rheumatism; Stone or Gravel in the Kidnies; Cholic and Griping of the Bowels; the Phthisic; Dropsy and Scurvy. In 1891, Dr. John Collis Browne's Chlorodyne was advertised as a treatment for coughs, consumption, bronchitis, asthma, diphtheria, fever, croup, ague, diarrhoea, cholera, dysentery, epilepsy, hysteria, palpatation, spasms, neuralgia, rheumatism, gout, cancer, toothache, meningitis, etc. Even Coca-Cola was marketed as a patent medicine in its early days: it was claimed to cure many diseases, including morphine addiction, indigestion, nerve disorders, headaches, and impotence.

The conventional medical profession pushed back against the claims of panaceas. In 1828, the New York state medical society adopted one of America's first medical ethics codes, which stated that patent medicines were not to be tolerated. From about the 1830s, one of the principal targets was Morison's "Hygeian Vegetable Universal Medicine". Morison retaliated by appealing to what is now known as the logical fallacy of the "appeal to nature", criticizing the medical reliance on chemicals in contrast to his remedies made from natural vegetables. In contrast to their advertised safety, Morison's pills could be dangerous, and fatal if taken in large enough quantities. In 1836, John MacKenzie, aged 32, who was diagnosed with rheumatism in the knee, died after one of Morison's agents gave him 1,000 pills over 20 days; that agent was indicted and found guilty of manslaughter. The following year, excessive consumption of Morison's pills was found to cause 12 deaths following investigations in York. Morison himself evaded punishment as the charges were against his agents. After Morrison died in 1840 and his sons took over, they expanded the product range. The pills were finally withdrawn from sale in the 1920s.

The founding of the Pharmaceutical Society of Great Britain in 1841 marked another step away from patent medicines and panaceas.

== Claims and restrictions ==
Legislation covering claims of cure-all preparations varies by jurisdiction.

=== Australia ===
In Australia, the criteria for the registration of drugs and other therapeutic goods in the Australian Register of Therapeutic Goods, which includes guidelines on advertising, labelling, and product design, are outlined in the Therapeutic Goods Act, Regulations, and Orders. Other aspects, like the scheduling of substances and secure storage of therapeutic goods, are subject to State or Territory laws.

=== United States ===
In 1906, the United States passed of the first Pure Food and Drug Act. This statute did not ban the alcohol, narcotics, and stimulants in the medicines; it required them to be labelled as such, and curbed some of the more misleading, overstated, or fraudulent claims that appeared on the labels. In 1936 the statute was revised to ban them, and the United States entered a long period of ever more drastic reductions in the medications available unmediated by physicians and prescriptions. Morris Fishbein, editor of The Journal of the American Medical Association, who was active in the first half of the 20th century, based much of his career on exposing quacks and driving them out of business.

In the United States, there have been cases of products that claimed to cure many, many diseases. Seasilver, a commercial dietary supplement that was sold via multi-level marketing plan, was promoted with the false claim that it could "cure 650 diseases", resulting in the prosecution and fining of the owners.

== See also ==
- List of topics characterized as pseudoscience
- Miasma (Greek mythology) – Contagious power believed to have a life of its own
- Mithridate – Semi-mythical remedy
- Moly (herb) – Herb in Greek and Roman legend
- Theriac – Medieval medical concoction
