= Epione =

Wife of Asclepius

- Health goddess
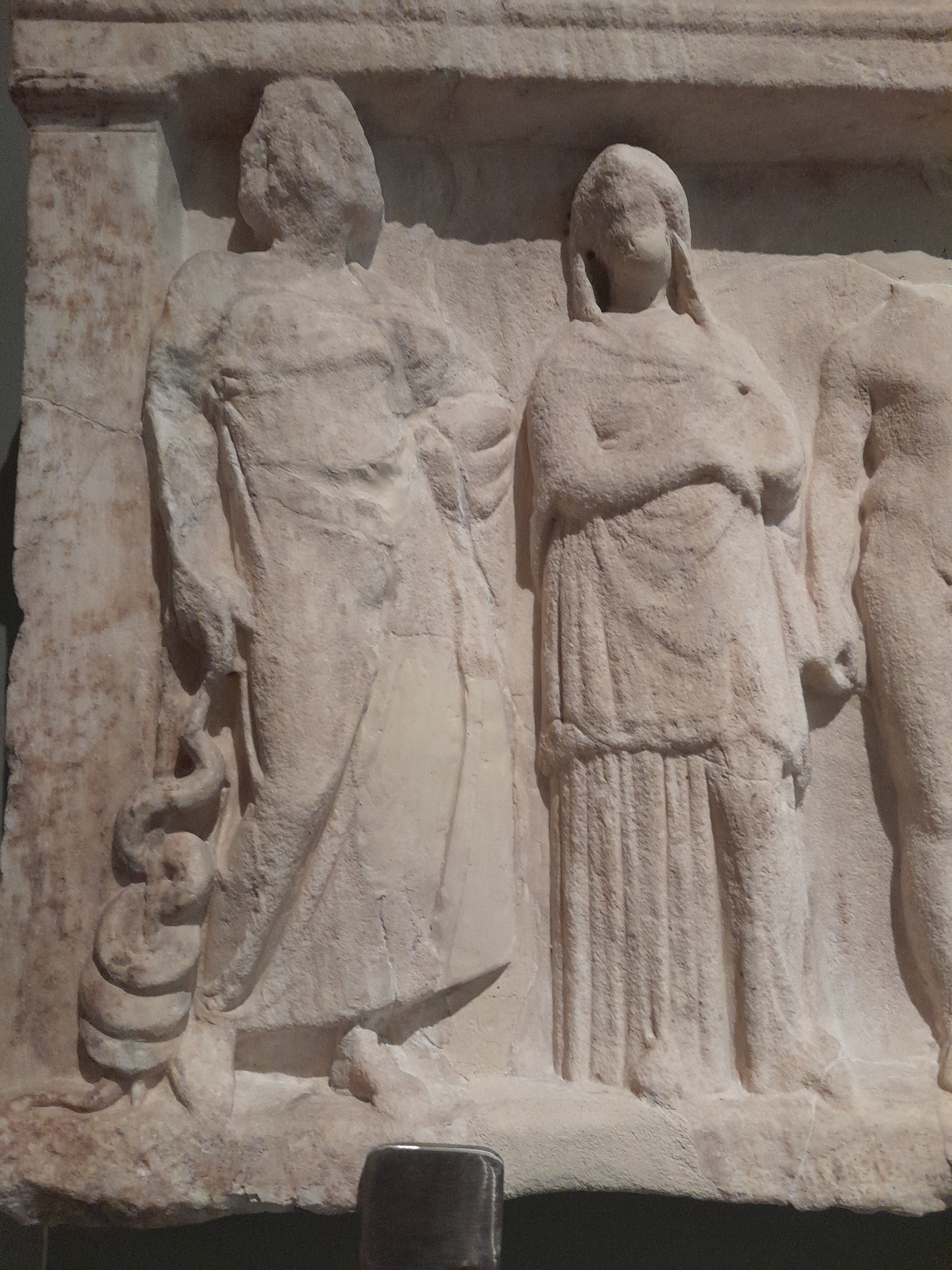
- Asclepius and Epione with one of their sons on a 4th-century BC marble votive relief, Archaeological Museum of Patras, Greece.
- Major cult center: Kos, Epidaurus

Genealogy
- Consort: Asclepius
- Children: Aceso, Aegle, Hygieia, Iaso, Machaon, Panacea, Podalirius

In Greek mythology, Epione (Ancient Greek: Ἠπιόνη, romanized: Ēpiónē, lit. 'soothing') is a minor health goddess, the wife of Asclepius, the Greek god of healing and medicine.

== Name ==
Her name is derived from the word ἤπιος (epios, "soothing"). Epione was the personification of the soothing of pain and the care needed for recovery.

== Family ==
Epione is not an active figure in mythology; her most prominent role is being consort to Asclepius and mother of his children. With Asclepius, she was the mother of the five Asclepiades: Iaso, Panacea, Hygieia, Aceso, and Aegle, as listed in the Suda. She also had two sons, Machaon and Podalirius, who are mentioned in the Iliad of Homer as well as Telesphoros.

== Cult ==
Epigraphical evidence suggests that Epione was a cultic figure in Athens, Epidauros, Kos, and Pergamon. Asclepius and Epione both had marble statues in Argolis, where Asclepius was widely worshipped.

== See also ==
- List of Greek deities

== Sources ==
- "Suida", Suda Encyclopedia translated by Ross Scaife, David Whitehead, William Hutton, Catharine Roth, Jennifer Benedict, Gregory Hays, Malcolm Heath Sean M. Redmond, Nicholas Fincher, Patrick Rourke, Elizabeth Vandiver, Raphael Finkel, Frederick Williams, Carl Widstrand, Robert Dyer, Joseph L. Rife, Oliver Phillips and many others. Online version at the Topos Text Project.
