= Syrna (Caria) =

Town of ancient Caria

Coordinates: 36°43′15″N 28°11′48″E

Syrna (Ancient Greek: Σύρνα) and Syrnos/Syrnus (Ancient Greek: Σύρνος) was a town of ancient Caria. According to Greek mythology Podalirius, son of Asclepius founded the place. He named it after the Carian princess Syrna (Σύρνα), daughter of Damaethus, whom he married her after he first healed her from a serious injury.

Its site is located near Bayır, Asiatic Turkey.
