= Hooded Spirits =

Hooded deities in Romano-Celtic religion

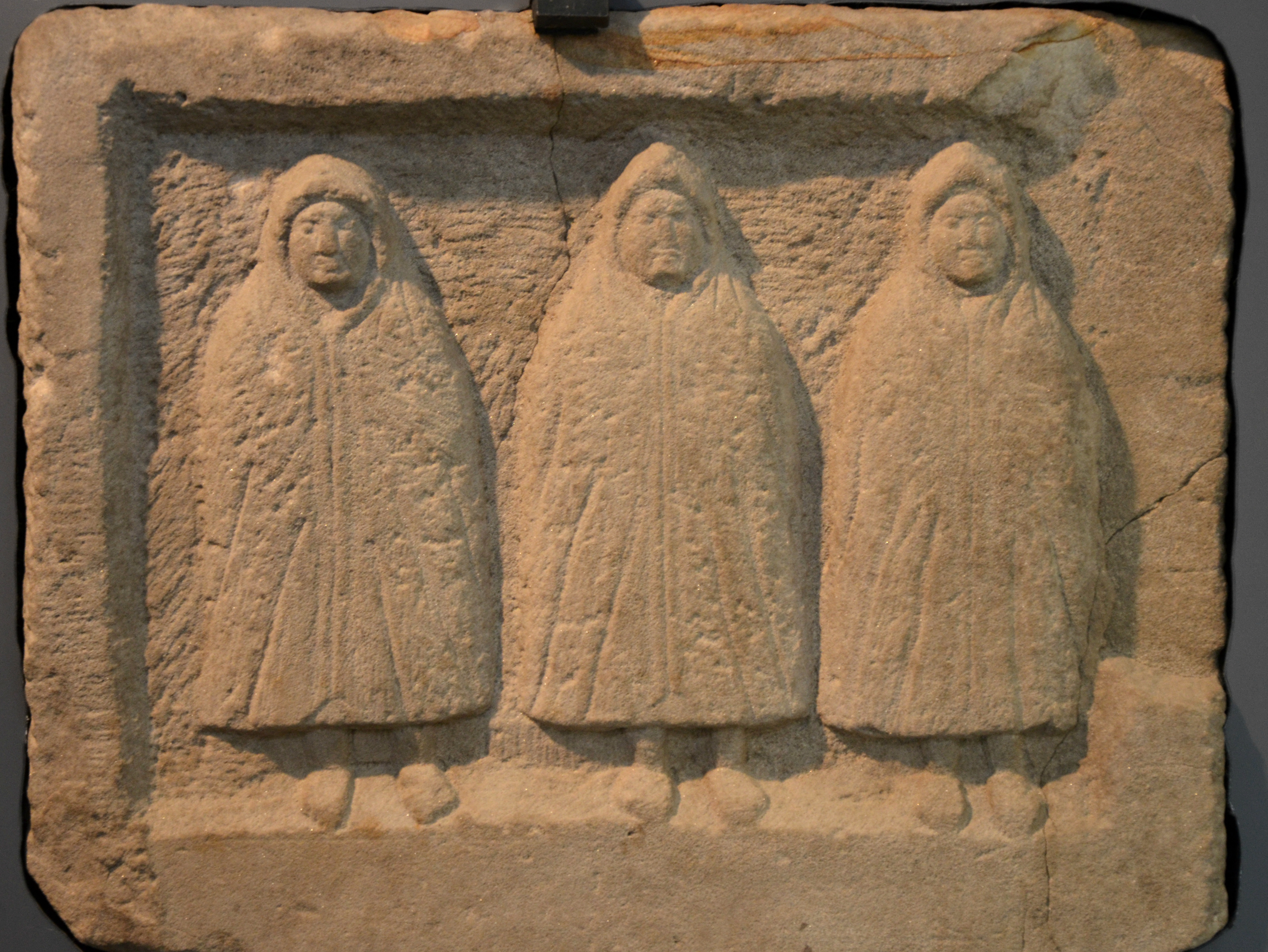
The Genii Cucullati, from a shrine in the vicus at Housesteads Roman Fort (Vercovicium) on Hadrian's Wall, early 3rd century AD

The Genii Cucullati (singular Genius Cucullatus), or Hooded Spirits, are hooded figures found in the religious art of the Roman-period Celtic world, from Britain to the Danube provinces. They take their name from the cucullus, the hooded cloak in which they are wrapped. No ancient writer mentions them, their character being inferred from the images themselves and from a small group of dedications. In Britain they are usually shown as a triad of small figures, whereas on the Continent a single figure is the rule. The Genii Cucullati are generally taken to be minor deities of fertility, healing and prosperity, with a possible connection to death and the underworld.

== Name ==
The figures have no name of their own in any ancient source. The label Genius Cucullatus ('hooded genius') is a modern one, taken from two Latin dedications from Wabelsdorf in Noricum, both found in 1930 and addressed in the dative to a Genio Cucullato. A genius in Roman usage is a guardian or generative spirit. The cucullus is a hooded cape, closed from neck to knee, that was commonly worn in the Celtic provinces, and the shared garment has been read as a mark of affinity between the figures and their worshippers. In Britain the cloak is the birrus Britannicus, also called a sagum, a heavy woollen hooded coat made for the cold, wet weather of Britain and northern Gaul.

The word cucullus is Latin, but it is generally thought to be a loan from Gaulish cucullos ('hood'). The word later passed from Latin into the Insular Celtic languages, giving Old Irish cochall ('monk's cowl'), Cornish cugol, Breton cougoul and Welsh cwcwll, and it survives in French cagoule. Ancient literature attests the garment but not the deity. The poet Martial twice names a Gaulish hooded cloak, the bardocucullus. Whether its first element bardo- refers to Celtic bardos ('bard') or to something else is disputed.

== Distribution and iconography ==
=== Britain ===
British images cluster in two regions: the Cotswolds, around Corinium (Cirencester), the tribal capital of the Dobunni, and the line of Hadrian's Wall. About twenty British reliefs are known, their distribution matching that of the mother-goddesses, along the northern frontier and around Cirencester. The figures are almost always a group of three, small hooded beings of no marked sex. The best-known relief, from the fort at Housesteads on the Wall, shows the standard triad, three cloaked figures staring out at the viewer.

The British figures repeatedly keep company with a seated mother-goddess, and around Cirencester they stand attendant on a figure who resembles one of the Mothers. At Corinium a mother-goddess with three cucullati stood in a row of sculptures that also included an altar to Mercury and the Matres, and a second group from the city was dedicated to the Three Mothers and the Suleviae. At Daglingworth, nearby, the attendant goddess is named Cuda. The figures carry various objects: on carvings from Cirencester and Wycomb they hold eggs, elsewhere they bear swords, and on a relief from Stratton a procession of three, each with a drinking-cup, approaches a seated goddess. Several of these carvings were mutilated in antiquity: on the Stratton stone the three figures and the goddess were beheaded on purpose, some years after the stone was cut.

The British reliefs are often cut in a spare, near-abstract style. On a plaque from Cirencester each of the three figures is reduced to a triangle topped by a hood, and Aldhouse-Green reads the bareness as a blank surface onto which worshippers could project their own meaning. Single figures also occur in Britain, among them a bone figure from the healing shrine at Springhead in Kent.

=== Continental Europe ===
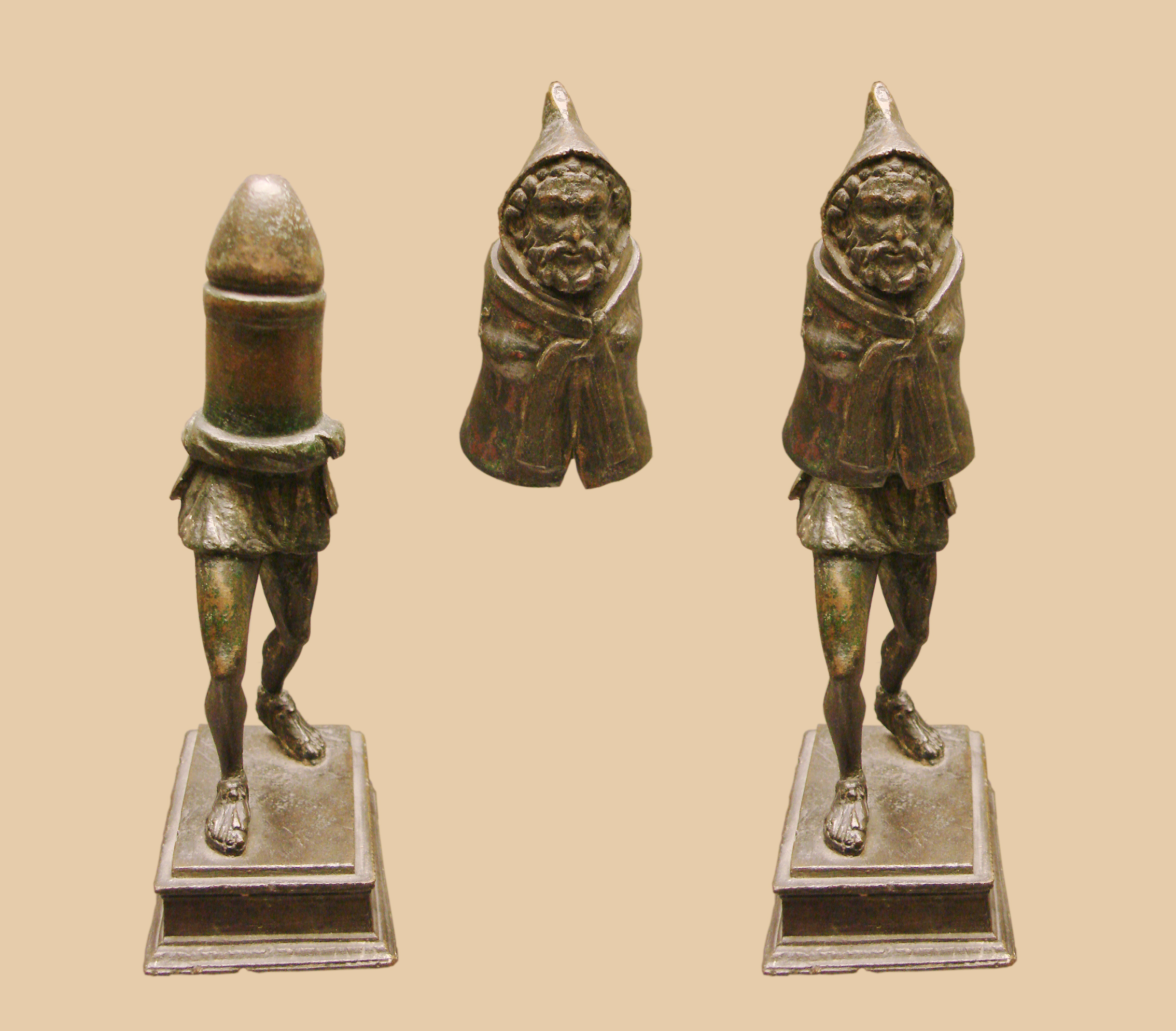
Gallo-Roman bronze statuette of a Genius cucullatus (or possibly Priapus) from Picardy, made in two parts, the upper section concealing a phallus

Away from Britain the type is normally a single figure, and its size ranges from dwarfish to giant. In some German examples it is a lone giant rather than a small triad. Images occur across Gaul, the Danube provinces, Germania and Britain, with a particular concentration in the Rhineland. The figure was especially common around Trier, where it appears in temples and tombs and at sacred springs. Among the votive material from the source of the Seine, in the sanctuary of the goddess Sequana, several of the wooden figures are hooded. Because the spring lay in the territory of the Lingones, the classicist Eugène de Saint-Denis identified them with Martial's Lingonic bardocucullus and took the cloak for a ritual bardic dress, though the archaeologist Simone Deyts regarded it as ordinary everyday wear.

== Interpretation ==
Because the British figures carry no inscription and no ancient author describes them, their religious meaning is largely a matter of inference. Their frequent association with the mother-goddesses points to fertility, and the recurrent egg has been read as a token of fertility or of life and rebirth. The carvings with children, fruit and bread suggest prayers for good harvests and healthy offspring. Their presence at curative springs, at Bath and Springhead in Britain and beside the healing god Lenus at Trier, points to a healing role. Taken together, the associations of the figures, in Britain and on the Continent, are with protection, fruitfulness and birth.

Jocelyn Toynbee connected them with both fertility and death, arguing that the shrouded, hooded heads evoke the Otherworld and the mystery of death. On the same reading the sword-bearing figures from Gloucestershire mark not war but the triumph of fertility or health over barrenness and disease. Miranda Aldhouse-Green later suggested that the hoods, with their power to conceal the face, may themselves signal a hidden or veiled identity, and that in Roman Britain the triads were a local form of the genius loci, the guardian spirit of a place, merged with the native reverence for the number three.

The form of the figures has prompted opposed readings of their sex. Graham Webster suggested that the hoods were meant to represent phalluses, likening them to the curved phallic stones found on Roman sites, a view Ronald Hutton treats as no more than a possibility. On some Continental figures the cloak is drawn back to expose a phallus, or the phallus serves as the nozzle of a lamp, while other figures have been read as female, with breasts beneath the robes and soft faces within the hoods.

The single Continental figure has been read as a hooded child and compared to Telesphoros, the hooded boy who attended Asklepios at Pergamon. The comparison was developed at length by Waldemar Deonna. Jan de Vries doubted that the figure was purely Gaulish and treated it as a Telesphoros type in Gaulish dress, spreading from Pergamon in the 1st and 2nd centuries AD. He held nonetheless that a native conception lay behind the borrowed form: the enveloping hood, he argued, marks a being of the underworld, and the figure shows the dead as a child, which he linked to the Celtic belief in rebirth. De Vries also recorded the view that genius is merely a Roman veneer, and that the figure is better called a god.

== Epigraphy ==
Unlike Britain, where the figures are never accompanied by a text, the theonym itself is recorded on two altars from Wabelsdorf, in Noricum.

Text	Find-spot	Divine name	Translation	Reference	Comments
Genio Cucullato sa(crum) C(aius) Iuventius Speratus et Cornelia Secundina v(otum) s(olverunt) l(ibentes) m(erito)	Wabelsdorf (Noricum)	Genius Cucullatus	Sacred to the Hooded Genius. Gaius Iuventius Speratus and Cornelia Secundina fulfilled their vow, willingly and deservedly.	ILLPRON 701	Marble altar of the 2nd century AD, now in the Landesmuseum für Kärnten, Klagenfurt.
Genio Cucu[llat]o [...]	Wabelsdorf (Noricum)	Genius Cucullatus	To the Hooded Genius ...	ILLPRON 702	Fragmentary. The divine name is partly restored.

== See also ==
- Matres and matronae
