= Dulopolis =

Dulopolis or Doulopolis (Ancient Greek: Δουλόπολις or Δούλων πόλις) means slaves' city.

Several cities have borne this name:

- A city of ancient Crete, which was mentioned by Sosicrates in the first book of his work on Crete, and was said to have contained a thousand male citizens. However, modern scholars treat Dulopolis as a false toponym.
- A city in ancient Libya.
- A city of sacred slaves, in which one man is free. Suda does not give any more information regarding this city.
- Dulopolis in Caria.
