= Panacea =

Greek goddess of universal health

- Goddess of universal remedy
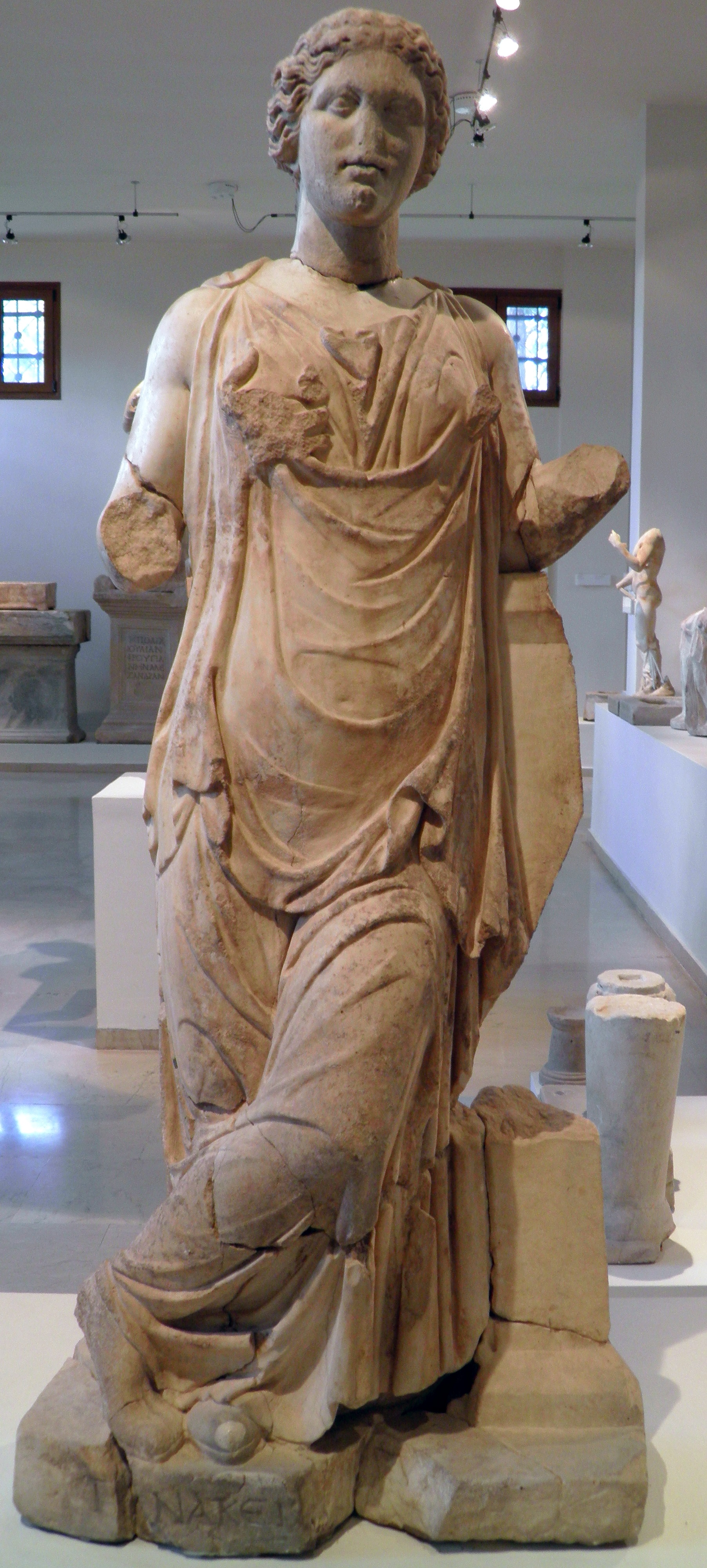
- Statue of Panacea in the Archaeological Museum of Dion.
- Abode: Mount Olympus

Genealogy
- Parents: Asclepius and Epione
- Siblings: Aceso, Aegle, Aratus, Hygieia, Iaso, Machaon, Podalirius, Telesphoros

In Greek mythology and religion, Panacea (Greek Πανάκεια, Panakeia), a goddess of universal remedy, was the daughter of Asclepius and Epione.

== Mythology ==
Panacea and her four sisters each performed a facet of Apollo's art:

- Panacea (the goddess of universal health and remedy)
- Hygieia ("Hygiene", the goddess/personification of health, cleanliness, and sanitation)
- Iaso (the goddess of recuperation from illness)
- Aceso (the goddess of the healing process)
- Aegle (the goddess of radiant good health)

Panacea also had four brothers:

- Podaleirus, one of the two kings of Tricca, who was skilled in diagnostics
- Machaon, the other king of Tricca, who was a master surgeon (these two took part in the Trojan War until Machaon was killed by Penthesilea, queen of the Amazons)
- Telesphoros, who devoted his life to serving Asclepius
- Aratus, Panacea's half-brother, a Greek hero and the patron/liberator of Sicyon

However, portrayals of the family were not always consistent; Panacea and her sisters each at times appear as Asclepius' wife instead.

Panacea may have been an independent goddess before being absorbed into the Asclepius myth.

Panacea traditionally had a poultice or potion with which she healed the sick. This brought about the concept of the panacea in medicine, a substance with the alleged property of curing all diseases. The term "panacea" has also come into figurative use as meaning "something used to solve all problems".

The opening of the Hippocratic Oath mentions Panacea along with Hygieia:

Ὄμνυμι Ἀπόλλωνα ἰητρὸν καὶ Ἀσκληπιὸν καὶ Ὑγείαν καὶ Πανάκειαν καὶ θεοὺς πάντας τε καὶ πάσας ἵστορας ποιεύμενος ἐπιτελέα ποιήσειν κατὰ δύναμιν καὶ κρίσιν ἐμὴν ὅρκον τόνδε καὶ ξυγγραφὴν τήνδε.

Translation:

I swear, calling upon Apollo the physician and Asclepius, Hygeia and Panacea and all the gods and goddesses as witnesses, that I will fulfill this oath and this contract according to my ability and judgment.

A river in Thrace/Moesia took its name from the goddess, and is still known in modern Bulgaria as the river Zlatna Panega ("Golden Panega", from Greek πανάκεια, panakeia).

== See also ==
- Apollo
- Eileithyia
- List of health deities
- Proteus
