= Telesphorus (mythology) =

Greek and Celtic deity

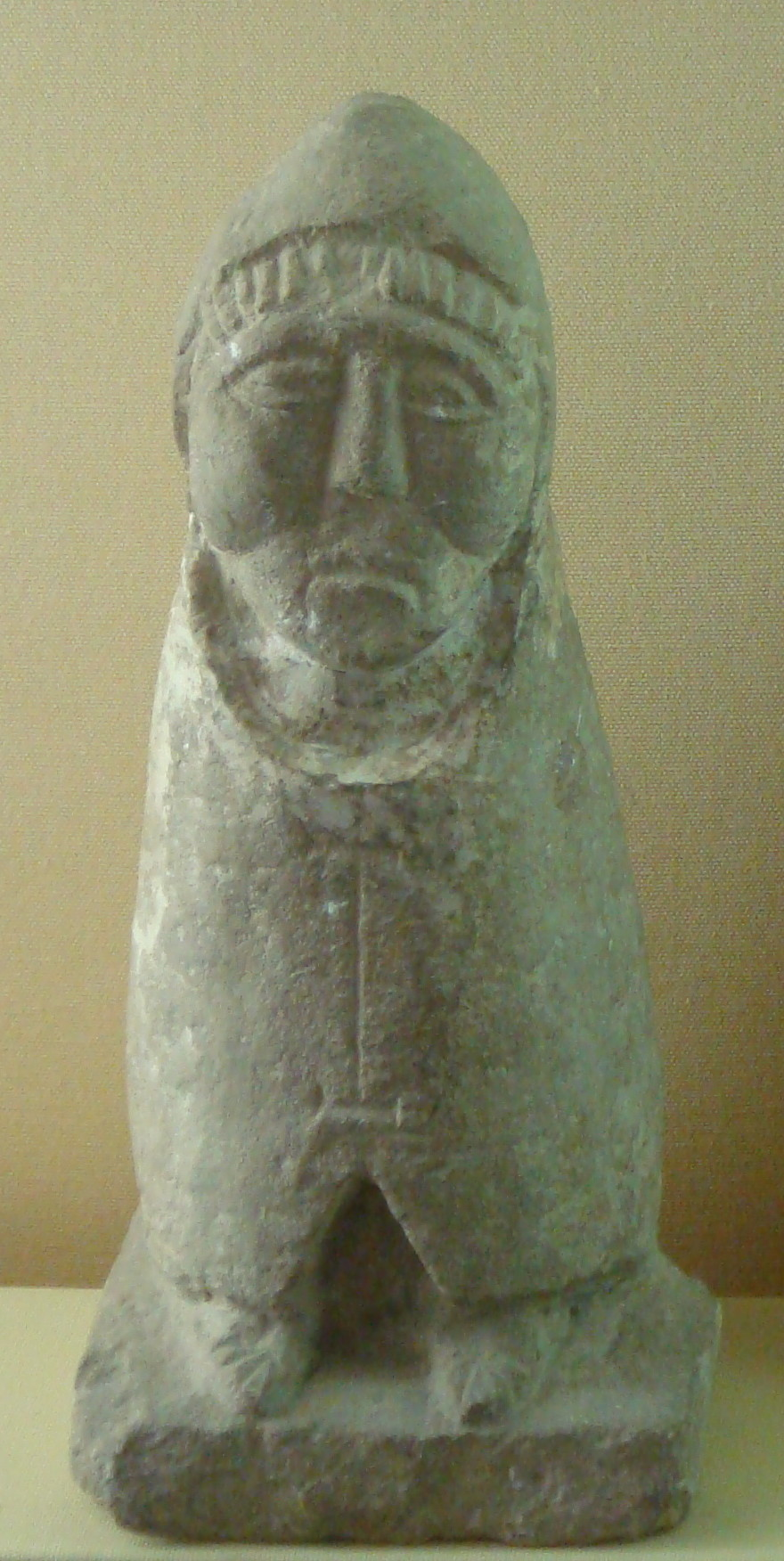
Gallo-Roman limestone statue of Telesphorus discovered in 1884 in Moulézan (southern France), now exhibited in the Archeological Museum of Nîmes. The god is dressed in the hooded cape typical of the depiction of Celts in Roman Gaul.

In ancient Greek religion, Telesphorus (Greek: Τελεσφόρος Telesphoros) was a minor child-god of healing. He was a possible son of Asclepius and frequently accompanied his sister Hygieia. He was depicted as a dwarf whose head was always covered with a cowl hood or cap.

He symbolized recovery from illness, as his name means "the accomplisher" or "bringer of completion" in Greek. Representations of him are found mainly in Anatolia and along the Danube.

== Origin and duties ==
Telesphorus is assumed to have been a Celtic god in origin, who was taken to Anatolia by the Galatians in the 3rd century BC, where he would have become associated with the Greek god of medicine, Asclepius, perhaps in Pergamon (an Asclepian cult center) and spread again to the West due to the rise of the Roman Empire, in particular during the 2nd century AD, from the reign of Hadrian. Telesphorus has been identified with the Genius Cucullatus invoked on two inscriptions in Noricum.

It is suggested by many scholars that Telesphorus was a protector of children for the healing gods. Ancient hymns honor and thank Telesphorus for guarding and favoring the birth of their healthy children. He is also depicted as the protective divinity of an Attican fraternity in lists from the third century BC. Statuettes recovered from two children's graves in Stobi, dated to the second century BC, depict Telesphorus together with a child and lead many scholars to believe that Telesphorus was thought to protect children even in death. Other representations of the deity have him depicted as a child as well.

== Family ==
Telesphorus was the youngest son of Asclepius, the god of medicine. He had five older sisters, Iaso, Hygieia, Panacea, Aceso, and Aglaea. He is frequently depicted accompanying his sister Hygieia in statues; Telesphorus, Hygieia, and Asclepius are often shown as a trio in inscriptions and coins.

Telesphorus was referred to as different names in different regions. In the Sanctuary of Asclepius at Titane, the statue erected is called Euamerion; in Epidaurus, the statue is called Acesis, which means cure; and in Pergamon, it is called Telesphorus. Telesphorus is the only one of the three names to be cited as a child of Asclepius in an Attican inscription from the second century AD.

== Temple of Telesphorus ==
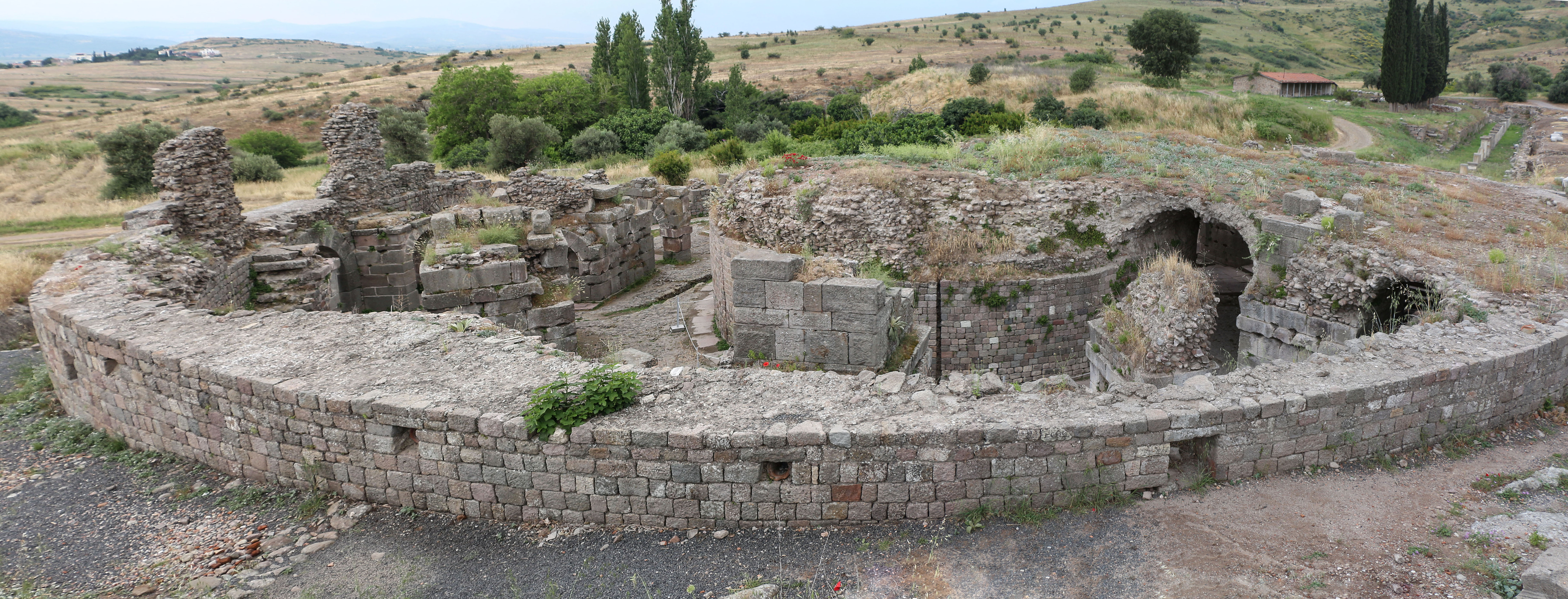
Temple of Telesphorus in the Sanctuary of Asclepius, Pergamon, Turkey

The temple of Telesphorus was a two-story dormitory in the Sanctuary of Asclepius, located in Pergamon, Turkey. According to Aristides, there were three temples: the north temple dedicated to Apollo, the middle temple dedicated to Hygieia and Telesphorus, and the south temple dedicated to Asclepius. These temples were used as sanctuaries for healing rituals conducted by priests, and they were built high up on a rocky outcrop of land known as the Felsbarre. A nearby spring fed water to multiple fountains and was sometimes used in the healing processes. Access to the temple was granted through a dark underground passageway which still exists today. A patient would be led through this passageway, into the temple, and be instructed to lie down at the base of a statue of Asclepius. The patient would be told that Asclepius or one of his children would appear to them in a dream and grant them health-giving powers. Once the patient was asleep though, priests had the opportunity to mend to their wounds. The temple was purposefully kept in the dark so that when a patient awoke, they would be granted by daylight; the contrast between dark and light created a psychological juxtaposition between sick and healthy in the patient's mind.

== Cult of Telesphorus ==
The cult of Telesphorus grew around Athens, Attica, and Thessaly; a third century AD eulogy from the area thanks Asclepius, Hygieia, and Telesphorus for their help in intervening an epidemic. The cult also bled into the Thracian area, where the cult becomes assimilated under the epithet Παυταλιωται.

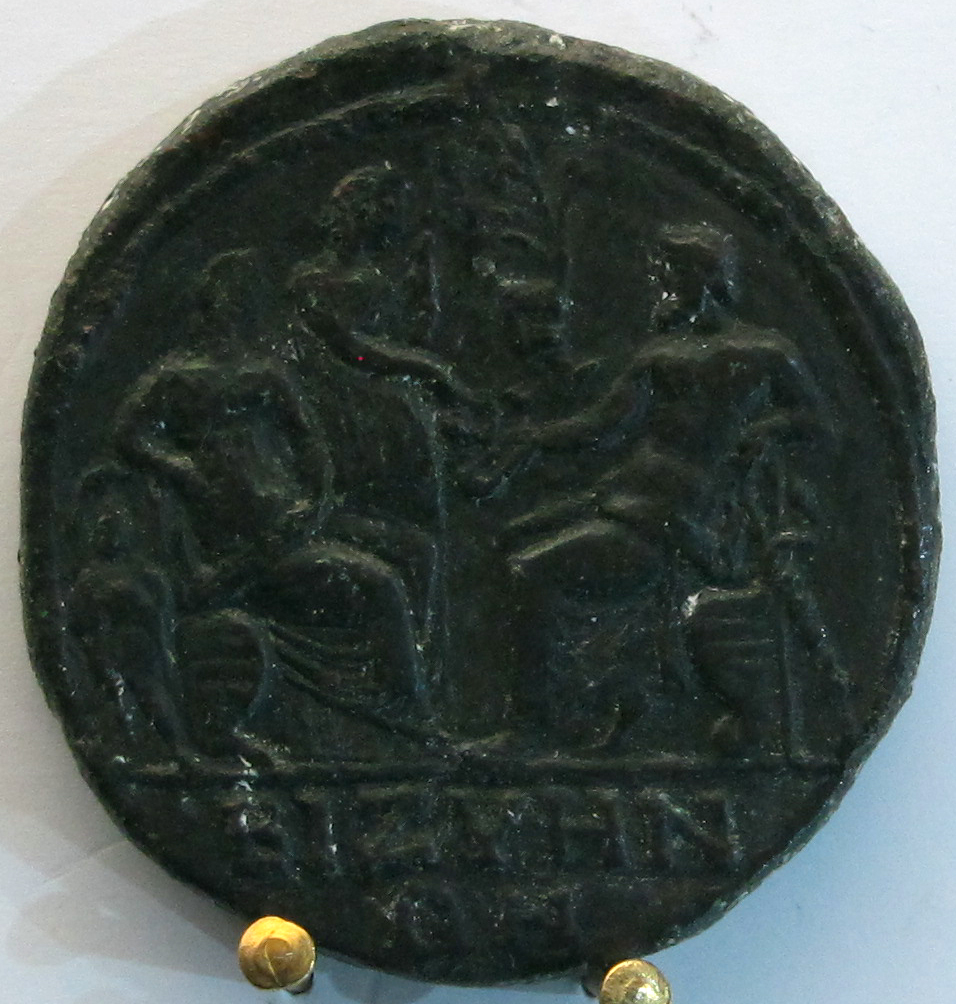
Medallion of Phillip I with Asclepius, Hygieia, and Telesphorus

== Coinage ==
Telesphorus first began to appear on coins in the third century during the reign of Caracalla, specifically appearing on provincial bronze coins. One coin, struck in Lydia circa 210 AD, depicts Caracalla on the obverse and Caracalla consulting Asclepius, Telesphorus, and Salus (the Roman equivalent of Hygieia) on the reverse. Another coin shows Asclepius and Telesphorus being recognized in conjunction as medical deities whose duties were to bring care and power to the atonement of health. Telesphorus also appears on a bronze medallion with Asclepius and Caracalla, which is believed to have been struck on the same day Caracalla left for Pergamus. This was to ensure that Caracalla were to be cured of his corporeal ailments and mind's diseases.

== See also ==
- Hooded Spirits
- Priapus
