= Aristodeme =

Name in Greek mythology

In Greek mythology, Aristodeme (Ancient Greek: Ἀριστοδήμη) was the name of two women:

- Aristodeme, a Sicyonian woman, who, according to a local tradition of Sicyon, became the mother of the demigod Aratus by Asclepius, who came to her in the form of a dragon. A painting of her and the dragon existed at Sicyon in the temple of Asclepius.
- Aristodeme, a Trojan princess as one of the daughters of King Priam of Troy by an unknown woman.
