= Bybassus =

Town of ancient Caria

Coordinates: 36°48′46″N 28°07′49″E

Bybassus or Bybassos or Bubassus or Bubassos (Ancient Greek: Βυβασσός) was a town in ancient Caria. Ephorus, according to Stephanus of Byzantium, wrote Bybasstum or Bybasston (Βύβασστον) and Bybastium or Bybastion (Βυβάστιον); and Diodorus means the same place, when he calls it Bubastus of the Chersonesus. Pliny the Elder has a "regio Bubassus;" and he adds, "there was a town Acanthus, otherwise called Dulopolis." He places the "regio Bubassus" next to Triopia, the district of Triopium. Finally, Pomponius Mela mentions a Bubassius Sinus. The Bubassia Chersonesus is mentioned by Herodotus.

Herodotus tells a story of the Cnidians attempting to cut a canal through a narrow neck of land for the purpose of insulating their peninsula, and protecting themselves against the Persians; they were at the work while Harpagus was conquering Ionia. The isthmus where they made the attempt was five stadia wide, and rocky. This place cannot be the isthmus which connects the mainland with the high peninsula, once called Cape Krio (now Cape Deveboynu, for it is sandy, and Strabo says that Cape Krio was once an island, but in his time was connected with the land by a causeway. Besides this, the chief part of the city of Cnidus was on the mainland; though we cannot be sure that this was so in the time of Harpagus. The passage in Herodotus is somewhat obscure, but mainly because it is ill pointed. His description is in his usually diffuse, hardly grammatical, form.

Herodotus says, "Both other Hellenes inhabit this country (Caria) and Lacedaemonian colonists, Cnidians, their territory being turned to the sea (the name is Triopium), and commencing from the Chersonesus Bubassiae, and all the Cnidia being surrounded by the sea, except a small part (for on the north it is bounded by the Gulf Ceramicus, and on the south by the sea in the direction of Syme and Rhodus; now at this small part, being about five stadia, the Cnidians were working to dig a canal." It is clear, then, that he means a narrow neck some distance east of the town of Cnidus.

Modern scholars identify the Bubassius Sinus with Hisarönü Bay, and Bubassus in the district of Hisarönü. At least on scholar places the site of the town in the neighborhood of Bozburun in the town of Hisarönü, others treat the site of the town as unlocated.
