= Acanthus (Caria) =

Town of ancient Caria

Acanthus or Akanthos (Ancient Greek: Ἄκανθος), also called Dulopolis or Doulopolis (Δουλόπολις), was a town of ancient Caria in the region of Bybassus.

Its site is unlocated.
