= Aceso =

Greek goddess of healing

- Goddess of the healing process and curing of sickness
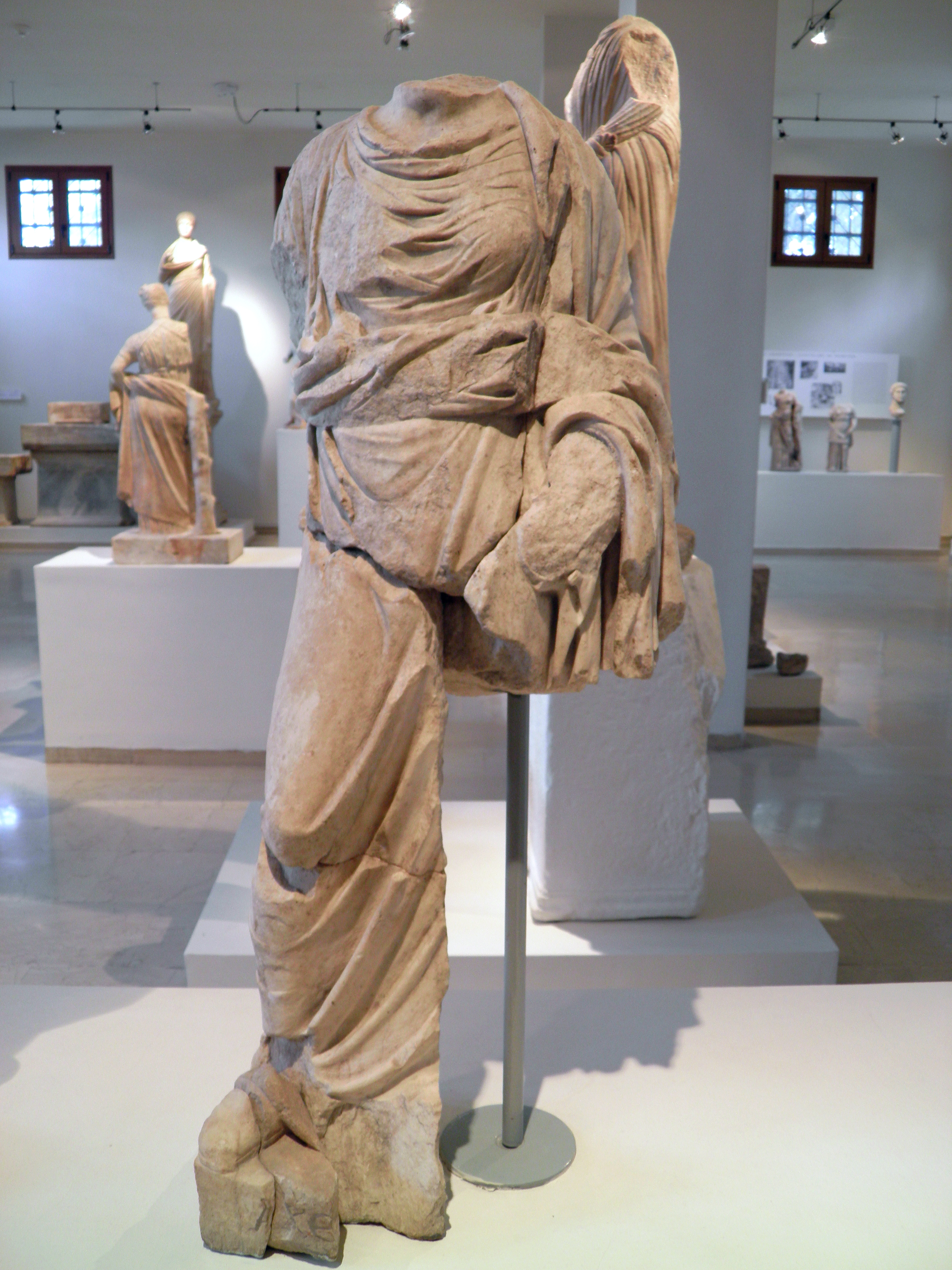
- The statue of Aceso, 2nd c. AD, Archaeological Museum, Dion

Genealogy
- Parents: Asclepius and Epione
- Siblings: Iaso; Hygieia; Panacea; Aegle; Machaon; Podalirius; Telesphorus

Aceso or Akeso (Ancient Greek: Ἀκεσώ, romanized: Akesó, lit. 'healing one') was the Greek goddess of well-being and the healing process worshipped in Athens and Epidauros.

== Family ==
Aceso was the daughter of Asclepius and Epione, sister of Iaso, Hygieia, Panacea, and Aegle.

== Mythology ==
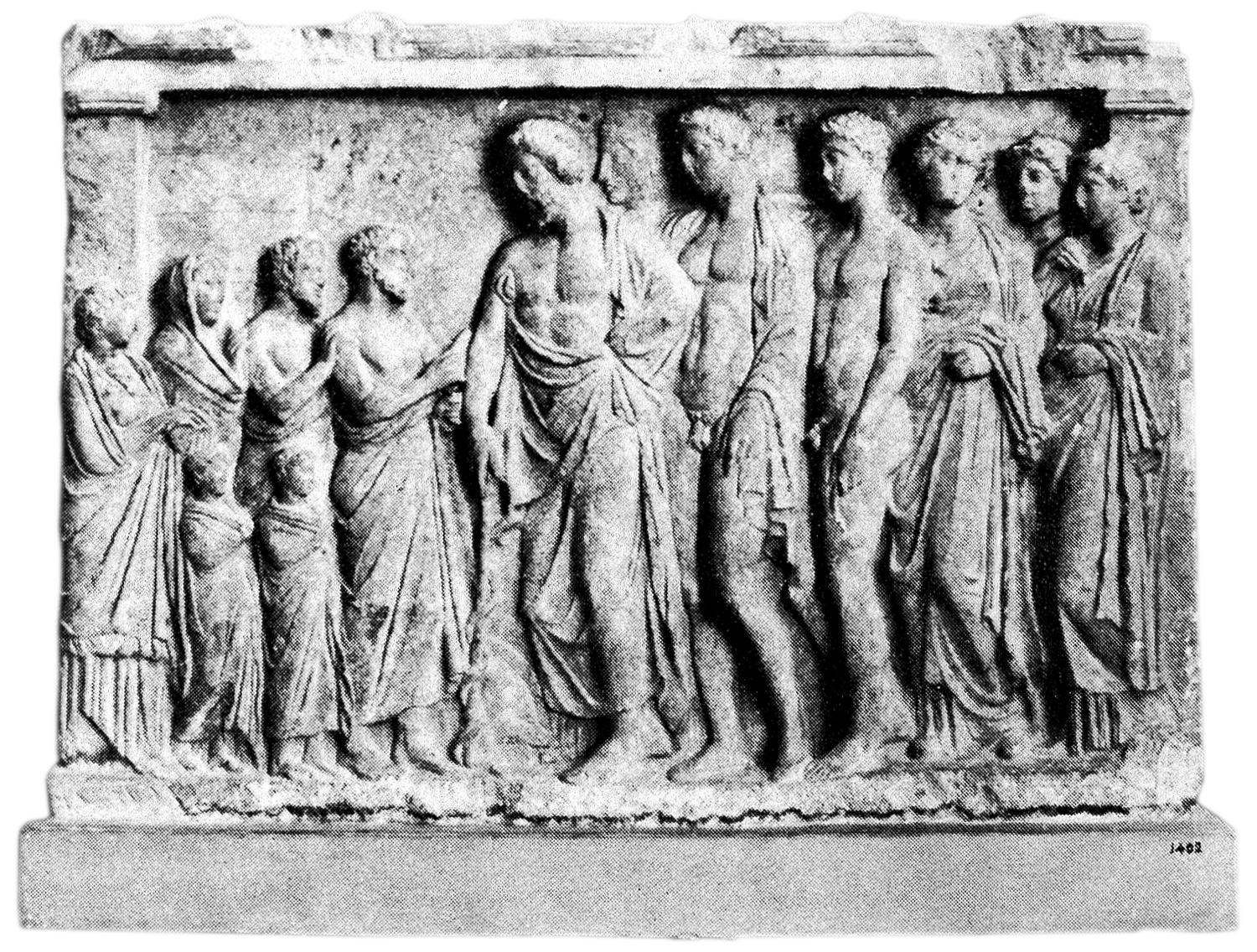
Aceso depicted with her father, Asclepios, and her siblings

Unlike her sister Panacea (Cure-All), she represented the process of curing rather than the cure itself. Her male counterpart was Acesis (Akesis). In Greek sculptural reliefs, Aceso appears alongside her father Asclepius and sisters Hygeia, Panacea, Aegle, and Iaso.
