= Aegle (mythology) =

Name of several different figures in Greek mythology

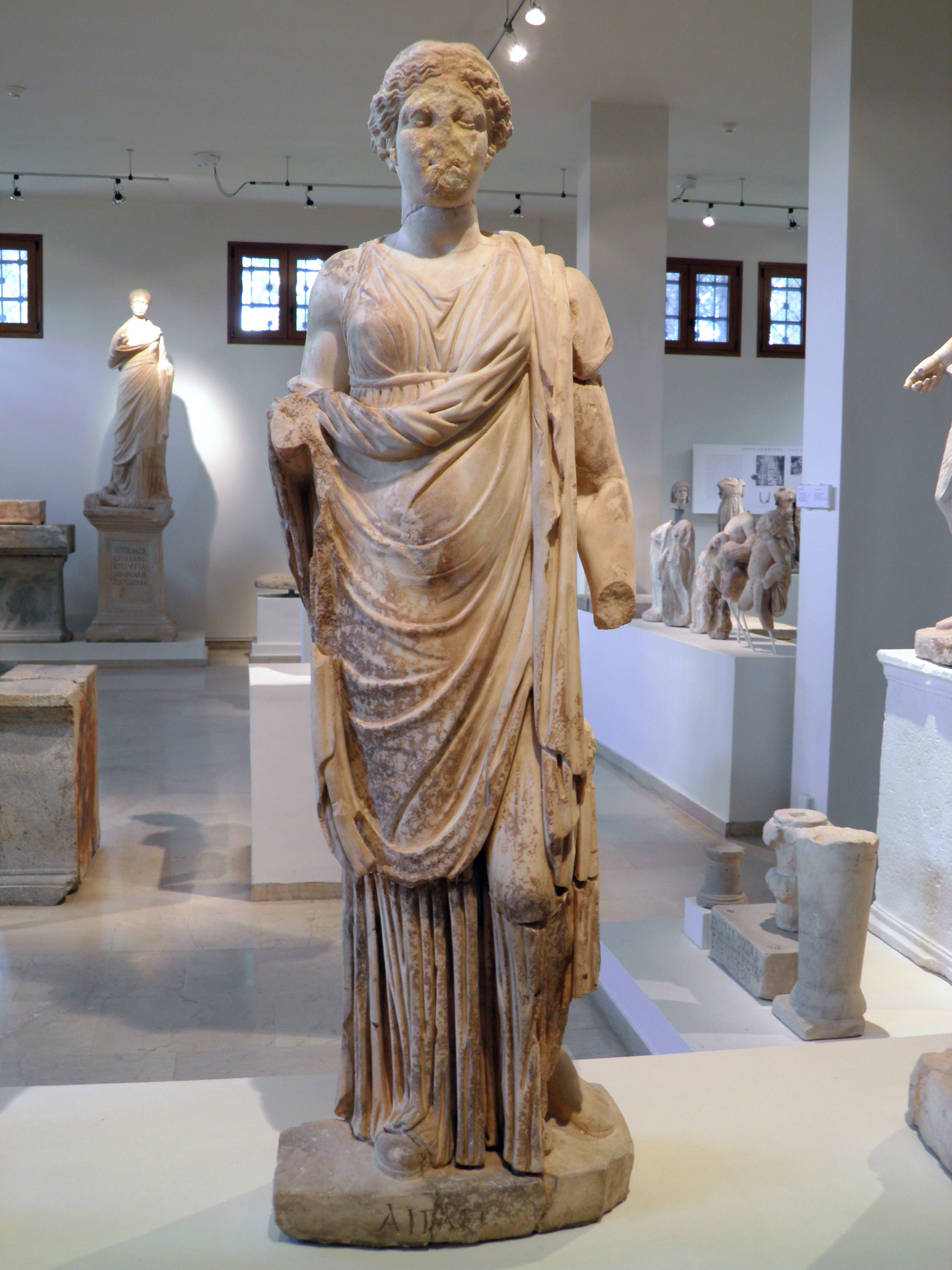
Aegle (daughter of Asclepius), 2nd-century statuette from Dion, Greece

Aegle (Ancient Greek: Αἴγλη, romanized: Aíglē, lit. 'brightness, dazzling light') is the name of several different female figures in Greek mythology:

- Aegle, one of the daughters of Asclepius. Her name is said to have derived from αἴγλη, meaning "Brightness," or "Splendor," either from the beauty of the human body when in good health, or from the honor paid to the medical profession. She is sister to Iaso, Panacea, Hygieia, Aceso, Machaon, and Podalirius.
- Aegle, the most beautiful of the Naiads, daughter of Zeus and Neaera, by whom Helios begot the Charites.
- Aegle, one of the Heliades, a sister of Phaethon, and daughter of Helios and Clymene. In her grief at the death of her brother she and her sisters were changed into poplars.
- Aegle, one of the Hesperides.
- Aegle, another name of Coronis, daughter of Phlegyas and lover of Apollo.
- Aegle, was a daughter of Panopeus, the Phocian hero. She was said to be one who was beloved by Theseus, and for whom he forsook Ariadne.
- Aegle, a nurse of Dionysus.
