= Hygieia =

Ancient Greek goddess of good health and cleanliness

- Goddess of good health, cleanliness, and sanitation
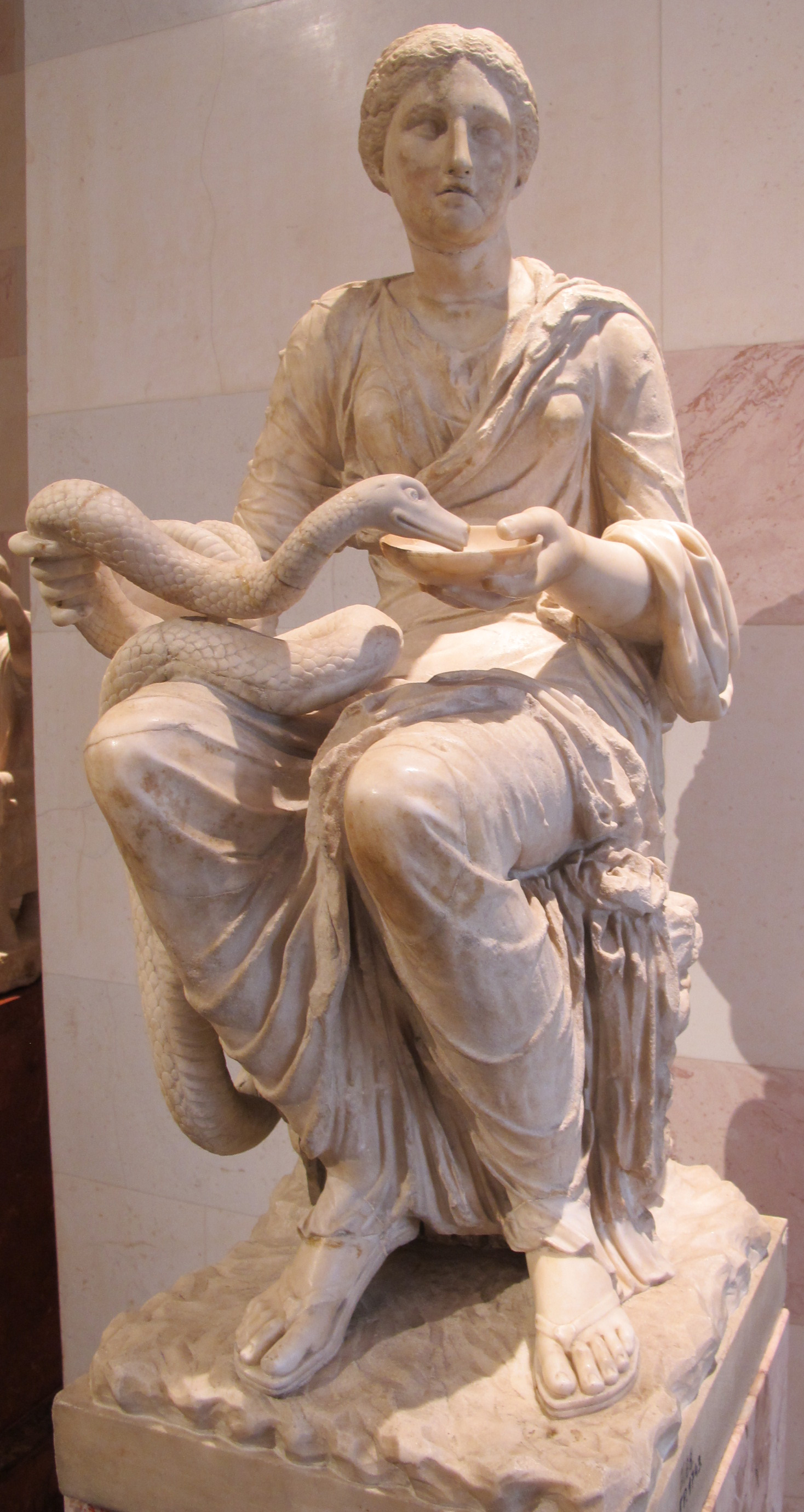
- Hygieia, 1st-century Roman statue
- Abode: Mount Olympus

Genealogy
- Parents: Asclepius and Epione
- Siblings: Iaso, Panacea, Aceso, Aegle

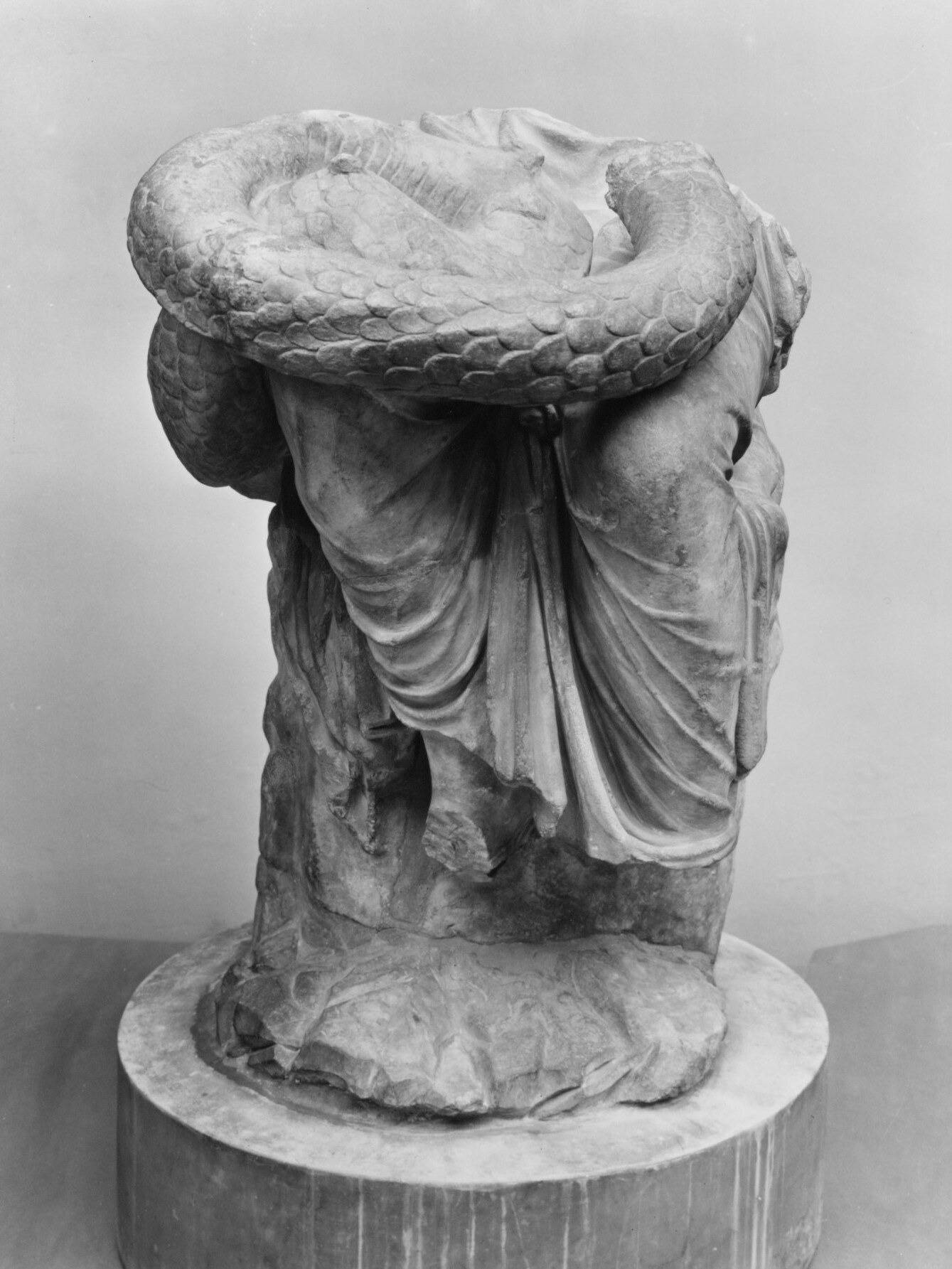
Image of a marble statue depicting the lower portion of the goddess Hygieia while seated with a portion of a snake coiled atop the legs. Located in the Roman collection in The Metropolitan Museum of Art, inv: 03.12.11a Dates to the 1st or 2nd century, A.D.

Hygieia (more commonly spelled Hygeia, sometimes Hygiea; /haɪˈdʒiːə/; Ancient Greek: Ὑγιεία or Ὑγεία, Latin: Hygēa or Hygīa) is a goddess of health (Greek: ὑγίεια – hygíeia), cleanliness and hygiene in ancient Greek religion. The English word "hygiene" derives from her name. Hygieia developed as a female divine complement within the cult of Asclepius, the Greek god of medicine and son of the Olympian god Apollo. She is often referred to as a daughter of Asclepius and his wife Epione, but replaces Epione as an iconographical consort.

Hygieia and her four sisters each performed a facet of Apollo's art: Hygieia, health, cleanliness, and sanitation); Panacea, universal remedy; Iaso, recuperation from illness; Aceso, the healing process; and Aegle, radiant good health. At temples of Asclepius, the divinities were believed to manifest in dreams, and patients engaged in the ritual of incubation (temple sleep) to seek healing.

== The role of Hygieia in antiquity ==
One notable reference regarding Hygieia's role as a goddess of health can be found within the Hippocratic oath. This oath is used by physicians in order to swear before various healing gods, one of which being Hygieia, that they would follow a code of established ethical standards of practice.

Section of the translated oath from Greek to English:

I swear by Apollo Healer, by Asclepius, by Hygieia, by Panacea, and by all the gods and goddesses, making them my witnesses, that I will carry out, according to my ability and judgment, this oath and this indenture.

== Hygieia and Asclepius ==
The worship of Hygieia was closely associated with the cult of Asclepius. While Asclepius was more directly associated with healing, Hygieia was associated with the prevention of sickness and the continuation of good health. In the second century CE, the famous traveler Pausanias provided an account based on what he witnessed within the state of Greece. In his encyclopedic text Description of Greece, written circa 160 CE to 174 CE, Pausanias described encountering statues of Asclepius and Hygieia, located at Tegea.

In addition to statues which represent the two figures, the incorporation of Hygieia within the cult of Asclepius can also be seen in medical iconography on numerous ancient Graeco-Roman coins. The close association between Hygieia and Asclepius indicates the important place she held in the cult of Asclepius.

== Worship ==
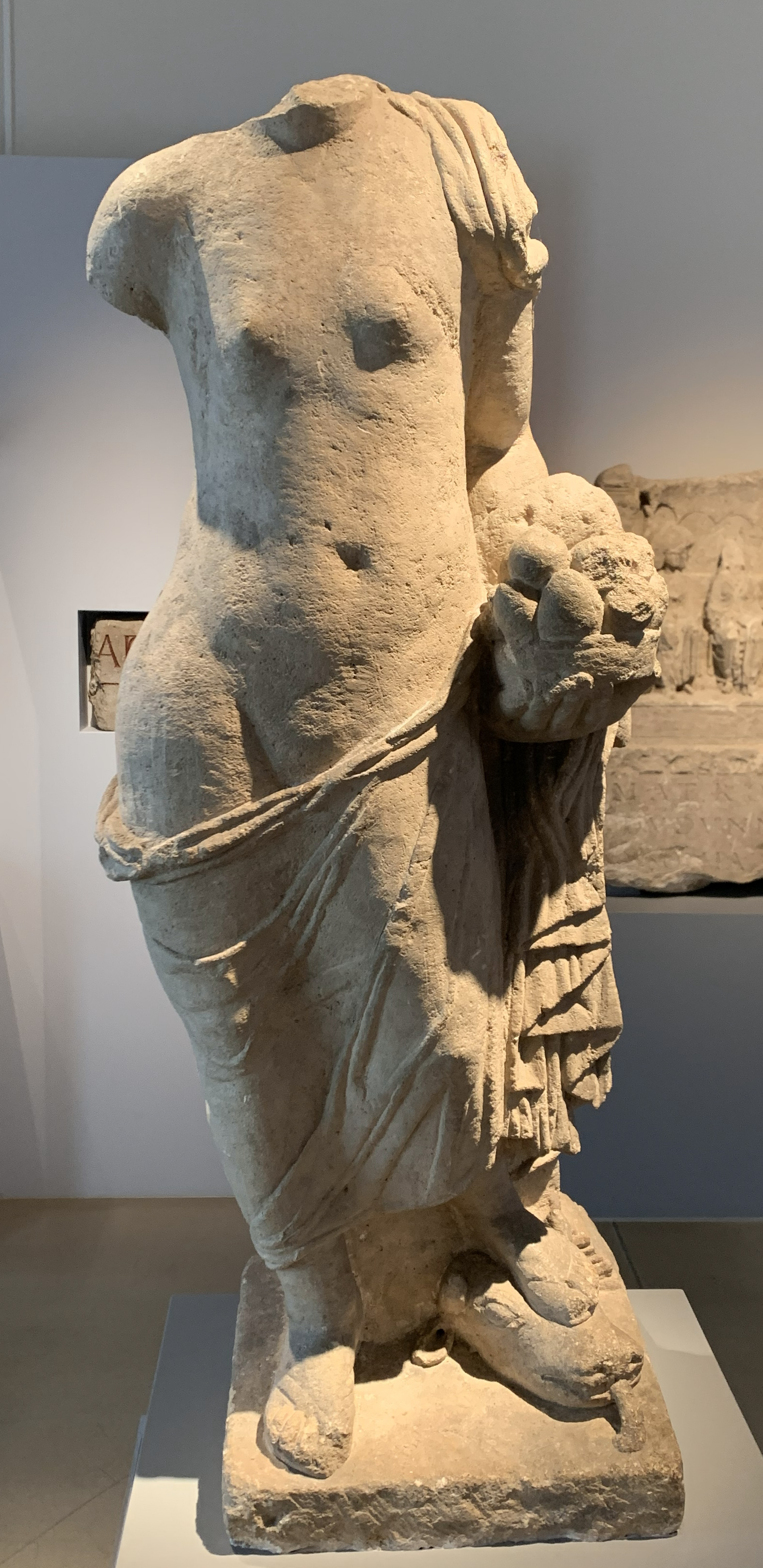
Votive statue dating 250-300. (Romano-Germanic Museum. Cologne).

Hygieia's primary temples were in Epidaurus, Corinth, Cos and Pergamon. At the Asclepeion of Titane in Sicyon (founded by Alexanor, Asclepius' grandson), the Greek historian Pausanias remarked that a statue of Hygieia was covered by women's hair and pieces of Babylonian clothes. According to inscriptions, similar sacrifices such as this were offered at Paros.

Hygieia was also associated with the Greek goddess Athena. In the 2nd century AD, Pausanias noted statues both of Hygieia and of Athena Hygieia near the entrance to the Acropolis of Athens. "Athena Hygieia" was one of the cult titles given to Athena, as Plutarch recounts of the building of the Parthenon (447–432 BC):

A strange accident happened in the course of building, which showed that the goddess was not averse to the work, but was aiding and co-operating to bring it to perfection. One of the artificers, the quickest and the handiest workman among them all, with a slip of his foot fell down from a great height, and lay in a miserable condition, the physicians having no hope of his recovery. When Pericles was in distress about this, the goddess [Athena] appeared to him at night in a dream, and ordered a course of treatment, which he applied, and in a short time and with great ease cured the man. And upon this occasion it was that he set up a brass statue of Athena Hygieia, in the citadel near the altar, which they say was there before. But it was Phidias who wrought the goddess's image in gold, and he has his name inscribed on the pedestal as the workman of it.

However, the cult of Hygieia as an independent goddess did not begin to spread until the Delphic oracle recognized her, after the devastating Plague of Athens (430–427 BC), and in Rome after the 293 BC plague there. The poet Ariphron, from the Greek city-state Sicyon, wrote a well-known hymn during the 4th century BC which celebrated Hygieia. Statues of Hygieia were created by Scopas, Bryaxis and Timotheus, among others, but there is no clear description of what they looked like. In the surviving depictions, she is often shown as a young woman feeding a large snake that was wrapped around her body or drinking from a jar that she carried. These attributes were later adopted by the Gallo-Roman healing goddess, Sirona.

"Hugieia" (ὑγιεία ‘health’) was used as a greeting among the Pythagoreans.

Hygieia was modified by the Romans into the goddess Valetudo, the goddess of personal health. There exists some debate about whether Hygieia can also be identified with the Roman goddess of social welfare, Salus; however, this has yet to be fully substantiated.

== Recent discoveries ==
In August 2021, archaeologists from Dumlupınar University announced the discovery of a statue of Hygieia in the Ancient Greek city Aizanoi. The human sized statue was portrayed with a snake in its arms. The statue was revealed inside the columned gallery throughout the south wing of the agora.

== See also ==
- 10 Hygiea, a main belt asteroid named after Hygieia
- Ancient Greek medicine
- Bowl of Hygieia
- College of Aesculapius and Hygia
- Eir, Norse healing goddess
- List of health deities
- Pericles

== General and cited references ==
- Mark Beumer, 'A Woman’s Touch. Hygieia, Health and Incubation', in: Journal of History of Sciences and Technology/DVT - Dejiny ved a techniky, Volume LV – Number 1-2 (2022) 25-55.
- Smith, William; Dictionary of Greek and Roman Biography and Mythology, London (1873). "Hygieia".
