= Asclepius =

Ancient Greek god of medicine

- God of medicine, healing, rejuvenation and physicians
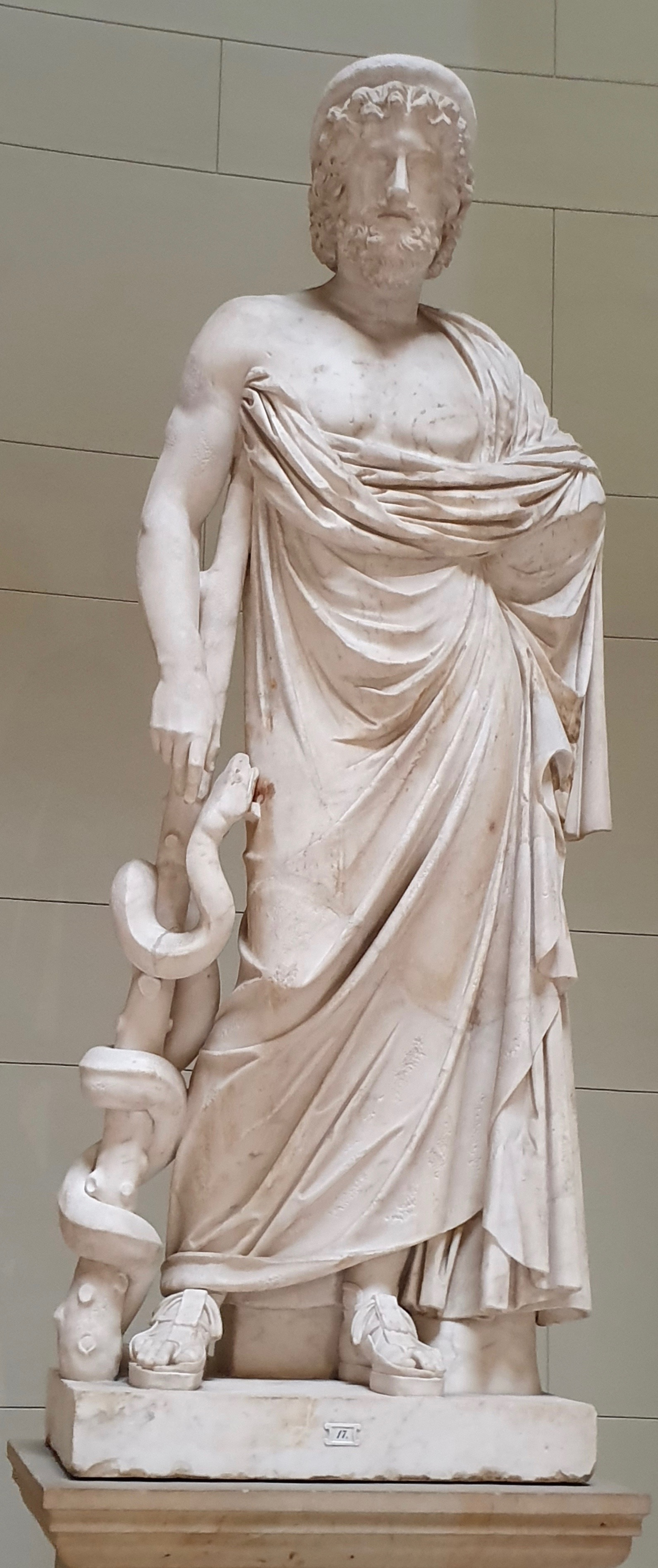
- Asclepius with his serpent-entwined staff, Roman statue in the Altes Museum
- Abode: Mount Olympus
- Symbol: Serpent-entwined staff
- Festivals: Epidauria, Asclepia

Genealogy
- Parents: Apollo and Coronis
- Consort: Epione, Aristodeme, Xanthe
- Children: Iaso; Panacea; Hygieia; Aceso; Aegle; Machaon; Podalirius; Telesphoros; Aratus

Asclepius (/æsˈkliːpiəs/; Ancient Greek: Ἀσκληπιός Asklēpiós [asklɛːpiós]; Latin: Aesculapius) is a hero and god of medicine in ancient Greek religion and mythology. He is the son of Apollo and Coronis, or Arsinoe, or of Apollo alone. Asclepius represents the healing aspect of the medical arts; his daughters, the Asclepiades, are: Hygieia ("Health, Healthiness"), Iaso (from ἴασις "healing, recovering, recuperation", the goddess of recuperation from illness), Aceso (from ἄκεσις "healing", the goddess of the healing process), Aegle (the goddess of good health) and Panacea (the goddess of universal remedy). He has several sons as well. He was associated with the Roman/Etruscan god Vediovis and the Egyptian Imhotep. The rod of Asclepius, a snake-entwined staff (often mistaken for the caduceus of Hermes) remains a symbol of medicine today. Those physicians and attendants who served this god were known as the Therapeutae of Asclepius.

== Etymology ==
The etymology of the name is unknown. In his revised version of Frisk's Griechisches etymologisches Wörterbuch (Greek Etymological Dictionary), R. S. P. Beekes gives this summary of the different attempts:

"H. Grégoire (with R. Goossens and M. Mathieu) in Asklépios, Apollon Smintheus et Rudra 1949 (Mém. Acad. Roy. de Belgique. Cl. d. lettres. 2. sér. 45), explains the name as "the mole-hero", connecting σκάλοψ, ἀσπάλαξ 'mole' and refers to the resemblance of the Tholos in Epidauros and the building of a mole. (Thus Puhvel, Comp. Mythol. 1987, 135.) But the variants of Asklepios and those of the word for "mole" do not agree.

The name is typical for Pre-Greek words; apart from minor variations (β for π, αλ(α) for λα) we find α/αι (a well known variation; Fur. 335–339) followed by -γλαπ- or -σκλαπ-/-σχλαπ/β-, i.e. a voiced velar (without -σ-) or a voiceless velar (or an aspirated one: we know that there was no distinction between the three in the substr. language) with a -σ-. I think that the -σ- renders an original affricate, which (prob. as δ) was lost before the -γ- (in Greek the group -σγ- is rare, and certainly before another consonant).

Szemerényi's etymology (JHS 94, 1974, 155) from Hitt. assula(a)- "well-being" and piya- "give" cannot be correct, as it does not explain the velar."

Beekes suggested a Pre-Greek proto-form *(a)-s^{y}klap-.

His name may mean "to cut open" from a story about his birth.

== Epithets ==
He shared with Apollo the epithet Paean ("the Healer"). He was called Aulonius, derived from a temple he had in Aulon, a valley in ancient Messenia.

== Mythology ==
=== Birth ===
Asclepius was the son of Apollo and, according to the earliest accounts, a mortal woman named Koronis (Coronis), who was a princess of Tricca in Thessaly. When she displayed infidelity by sleeping with a mortal named Ischys, Apollo found out with his prophetic powers and killed Ischys. Coronis was killed by Artemis for being unfaithful to Apollo and was laid out on a funeral pyre to be consumed, but Apollo rescued the child by cutting him from Coronis's womb.

According to Delphian tradition, Asclepius was born in the temple of Apollo, with Lachesis acting as a midwife and Apollo relieving the pains of Coronis. Apollo named the child after Coronis's nickname, Aegle.

Phoenician tradition maintains that Asclepius was born of Apollo without any woman involved.

According to the Roman poet Ovid, Apollo, having learned about Coronis's betrayal with the mortal Ischys through his raven Lycius, killed her with his arrows. Before breathing her last breath, she revealed to Apollo that she was pregnant with his child. He repented his actions and unsuccessfully tried to save her. At last, he removed their son safely from her belly before she was consumed by the fire.

In yet another version, Coronis who was already pregnant with Apollo's child, had to accompany her father to Peloponnesos. She had kept her pregnancy hidden from her father. In Epidaurus, she bore a son and exposed him on a mountain called Tittheion (from τίτθη "wet nurse", τιτθεύω "to suckle, breastfeed"). The child was given milk by one of the goats that pastured about the mountain, and was guarded by the watch-dog of the herd. Aresthanas, the owner of goats and the guard dogs found the child. As he came near, he saw lightning that flashed from the child, and thinking of it to be a sign of the divine, he left the child alone. Asclepius was later taken by Apollo.

According to Strabo and other traditions, the birthplace of Asclepius was Tricca (modern Trikala city in Thessaly).

=== Education and adventures ===
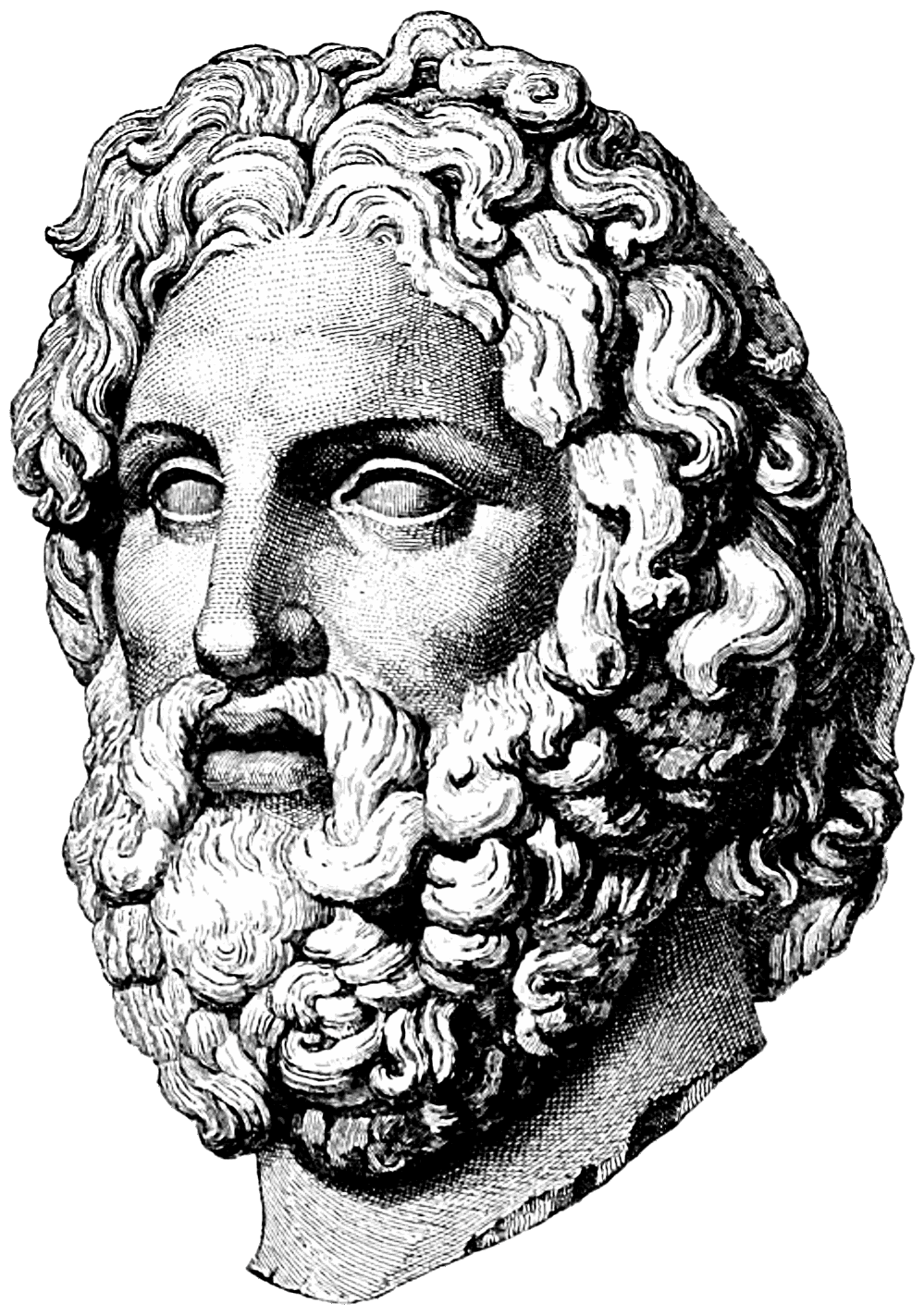
Zeus-like facial features of Asclepius (Melos)

Apollo named the rescued baby "Asclepius" and reared him for a while, and taught him many things about medicine. However, like his half-brother, Aristaeus, Asclepius had his formal education under the centaur Chiron who instructed him in the art of medicine.

It is said that in return for some kindness rendered by Asclepius, a snake licked Asclepius's ears clean and taught him secret knowledge (to the Greeks, snakes were sacred beings of wisdom, healing, and resurrection). Asclepius bore a rod wreathed with a snake, which became associated with healing. Another version states that when Asclepius (or in another myth Polyidus) was commanded to restore the life of Glaucus, he was confined in a secret prison. While pondering what he should do, a snake crept near his staff. Lost in his thoughts, Asclepius unknowingly killed it by hitting it again and again with his staff. Later, another snake came there with an herb in its mouth and placed it on the head of a dead snake, which soon came back to life. Seeing this, Asclepius used the same herb, which brought Glaucus back. A species of non-venomous pan-Mediterranean serpent, the Aesculapian snake (Zamenis longissimus) is named for the god.

The 12th c. John Tzetzes says that Asclepius was originally called Hepius but received his popular name of Asclepius after he cured Ascles, ruler of Epidaurus who suffered an incurable ailment in his eyes.

Asclepius was said to have cured the blindness of Hermon of Thasos, but the god made him blind again after Hermon did not bring him the thank-offerings.

Asclepius was listed among those who took part in the Calydonian Boar hunt as well as among the Argonauts.

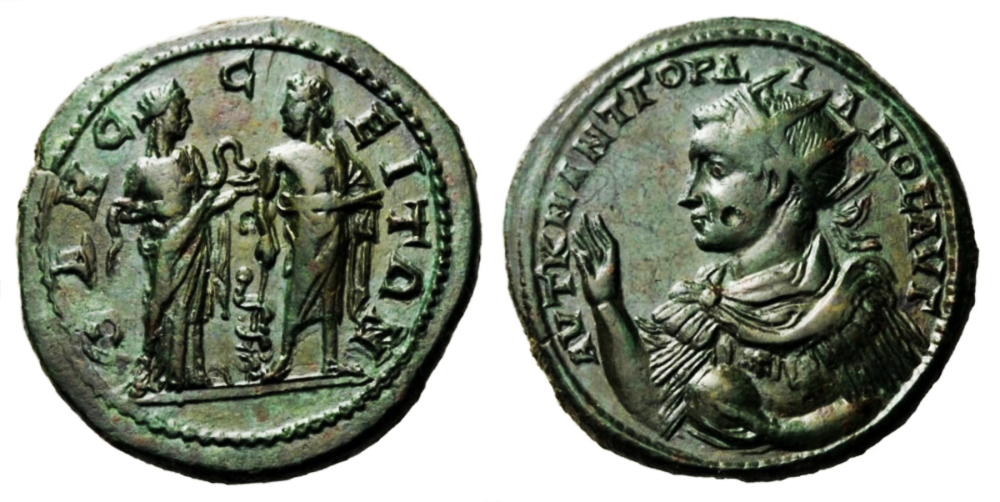
Roman coin from Odessos showing Asclepius with Hygieia on one side and Gordian III's portrait on the other side (35mm, 28g)

=== Marriage and family ===
Asclepius was married to Epione, with whom he had five daughters: Iaso, Panacea, Hygieia, Aceso, and Aegle, and three sons: Machaon, Podaleirios and Telesphoros. He also sired a son, Aratus, with Aristodeme.

=== Death and immortality ===
Asclepius once started bringing back to life the dead people like Tyndareus, Capaneus, Glaucus, Hymenaeus, Lycurgus and others. Others say he brought Hippolytus back from the dead on Artemis's request, and accepted gold for it, or maybe he did it for love.

However, Hades accused Asclepius of stealing his subjects and complained to his brother Zeus about it. According to others, Zeus was afraid that Asclepius would teach the art of resurrection to other humans as well. Concerning the fate of Asclepius, Ovid writes that "the youth [Asclepius] blasted by ancestral bolts [of Zeus] soars from earth [rising as the constellation Ophiuchus] and flings his hands coiled with double snakes." Later accounts read "The Serpent-Holder. Many astronomers have imagined that he is Aesculapius [Asclepius], whom Jupiter [Zeus], for the sake of Apollo, put among the stars." Asclepius was killed by Zeus, and by Apollo's request, was subsequently immortalized as a star.

== Sacred places and practices ==
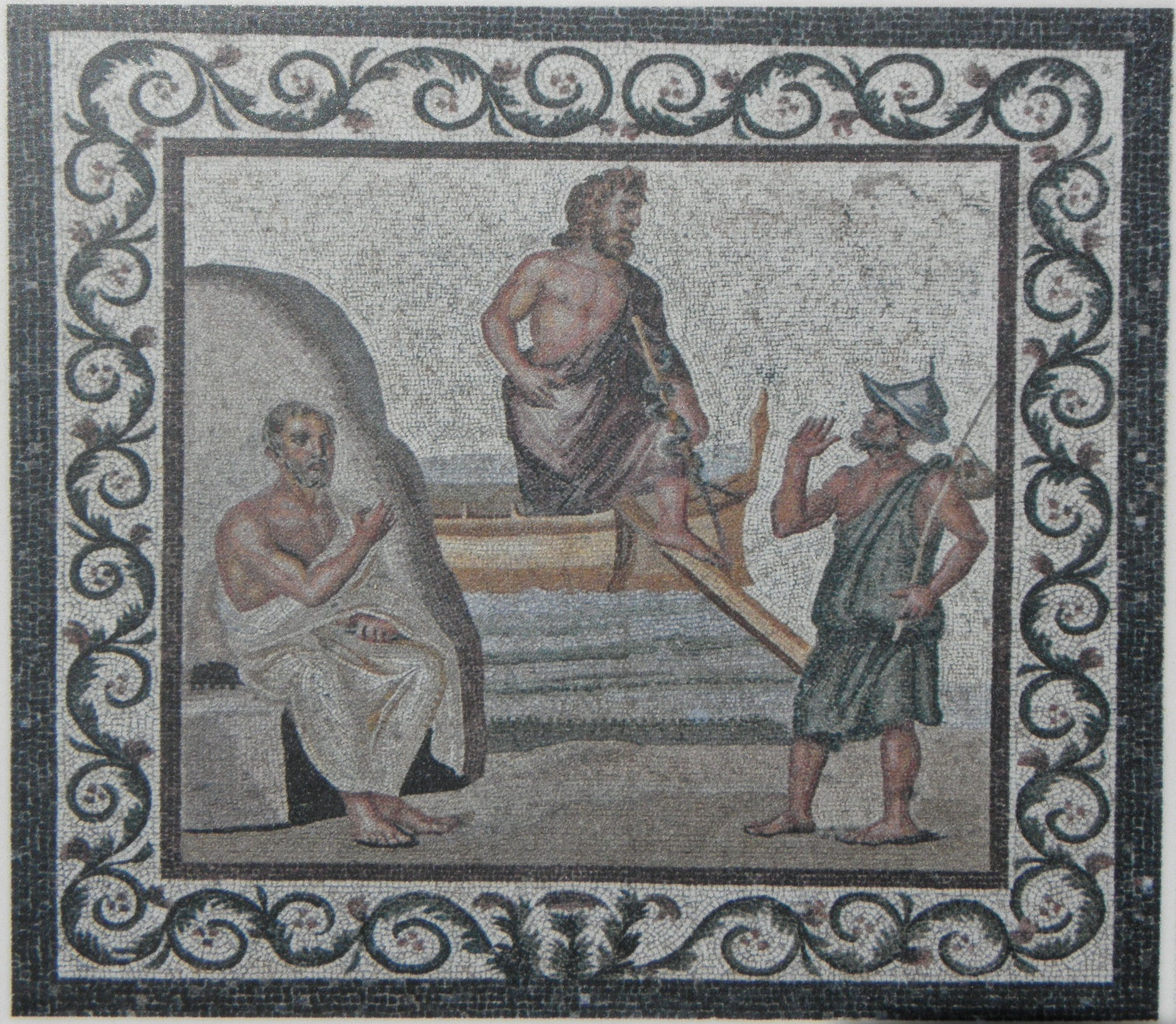
Asclepius (center) arrives in Kos and is greeted by Hippocrates (left) and a citizen (right), mosaic, 2nd–3rd century AD

The most ancient and the most prominent asclepeion (or healing temple) according to the geographer of the 1st century BC, Strabo, was situated in Trikala. The 1st century AD Pool of Bethesda, described in the Gospel of John, chapter 5, was found by archaeologists in 1964 to be part of an asclepeion. One of the most famous temples of Asclepius was at Epidaurus in north-eastern Peloponnese, dated to the fourth century BC. Another famous asclepeion was built approximately a century later on the island of Kos, where Hippocrates, the legendary "father of medicine", may have begun his career. Other asclepieia were situated in Gortys (in Arcadia), and Pergamum in Asia.

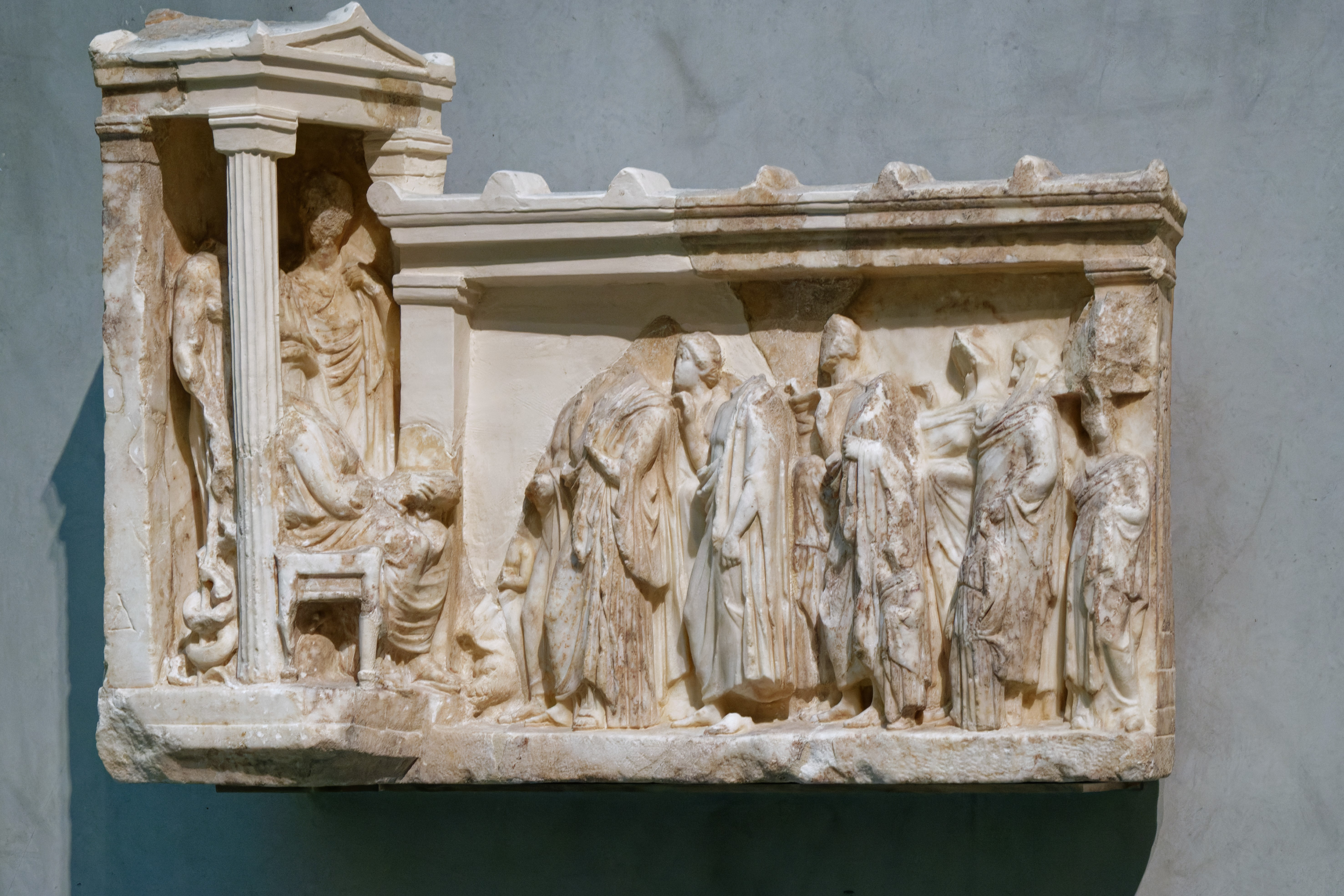
Votive relief of Asclepius, Epione and Hygieia. Mid-4th cent. BC, Acropolis Museum, Athens.

From the fifth century BC onwards, the cult of Asclepius grew very popular and pilgrims flocked to his healing temples (Asclepieia) to be cured of their ills. Ritual purification would be followed by offerings or sacrifices to the god (according to means), and the supplicant would then spend the night in the holiest part of the sanctuary—the abaton (or adyton). Any dreams or visions would be reported to a priest who would prescribe the appropriate therapy by a process of interpretation. Some healing temples also used sacred dogs to lick the wounds of sick petitioners. In honor of Asclepius, a particular type of non-venomous snake was often used in healing rituals, and these snakes—the Aesculapian Snakes—slithered around freely on the floor in dormitories where the sick and injured slept. These snakes were introduced at the founding of each new temple of Asclepius throughout the classical world.

The original Hippocratic Oath began with the invocation "I swear by Apollo the Physician and by Asclepius and by Hygieia and Panacea and by all the gods ...".

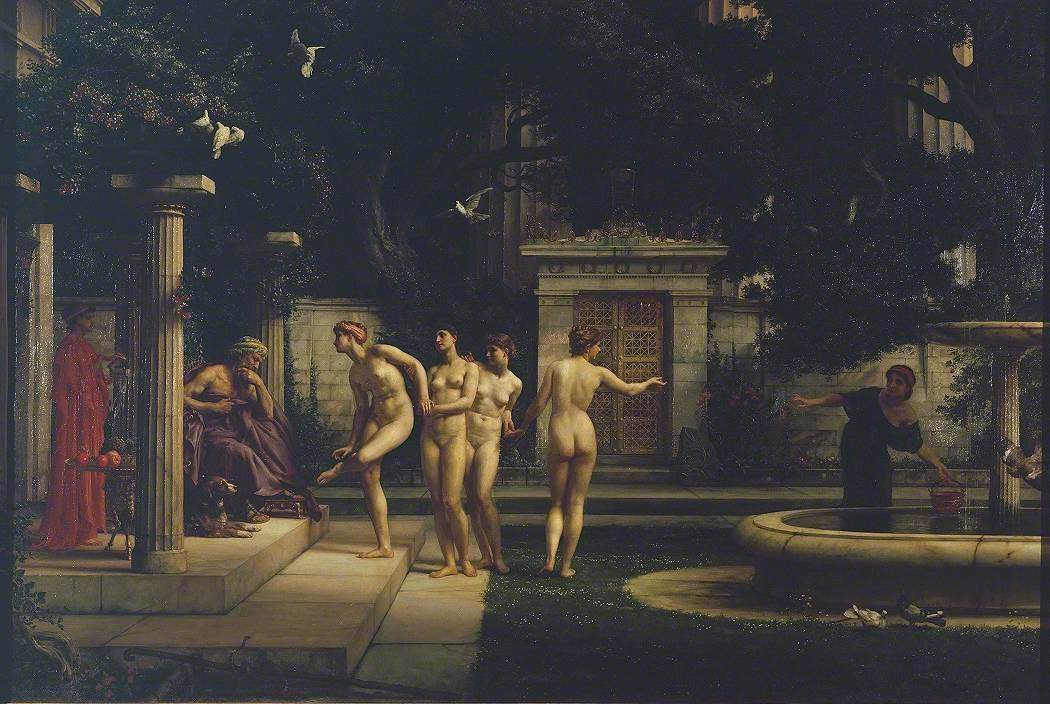
A Visit to Aesculapius by Edward Poynter, 1880

Epidauria (τὰ Ἐπιδαύρια) was a festival at Athens in honour of Asclepius.

Some later religious movements claimed links to Asclepius. In the 2nd century AD the controversial miracle-worker Alexander claimed that his god Glycon, a snake with a "head of linen" was an incarnation of Asclepius. The Greek language rhetorician and satirist Lucian produced the work Alexander the False Prophet to denounce the swindler for future generations. He described Alexander as having a character "made up of lying, trickery, perjury, and malice; [it was] facile, audacious, venturesome, diligent in the execution of its schemes, plausible, convincing, masking as good, and wearing an appearance absolutely opposite to its purpose." In Rome, the College of Aesculapius and Hygia was an association (collegium) that served as a burial society and dining club that also participated in the Imperial cult.

The botanical genus Asclepias (commonly known as milkweed) is named after him and includes the medicinal plant A. tuberosa or "Pleurisy root". Asclepius was depicted on the reverse of the Greek 10,000 drachmas banknote of 1995–2001.

At the city of Miletus, archaeologists discovered a cave under the city's theatre which was associated with Asclepius cult.

At Hyperteleatum, Hypsi and Hyettus there were temples of Asclepius.

== See also ==
- Rod of Asclepius
- Darrhon
- 1027 Aesculapia
