= Podalirius =

Mythical son of Asclepius in Greek mythology

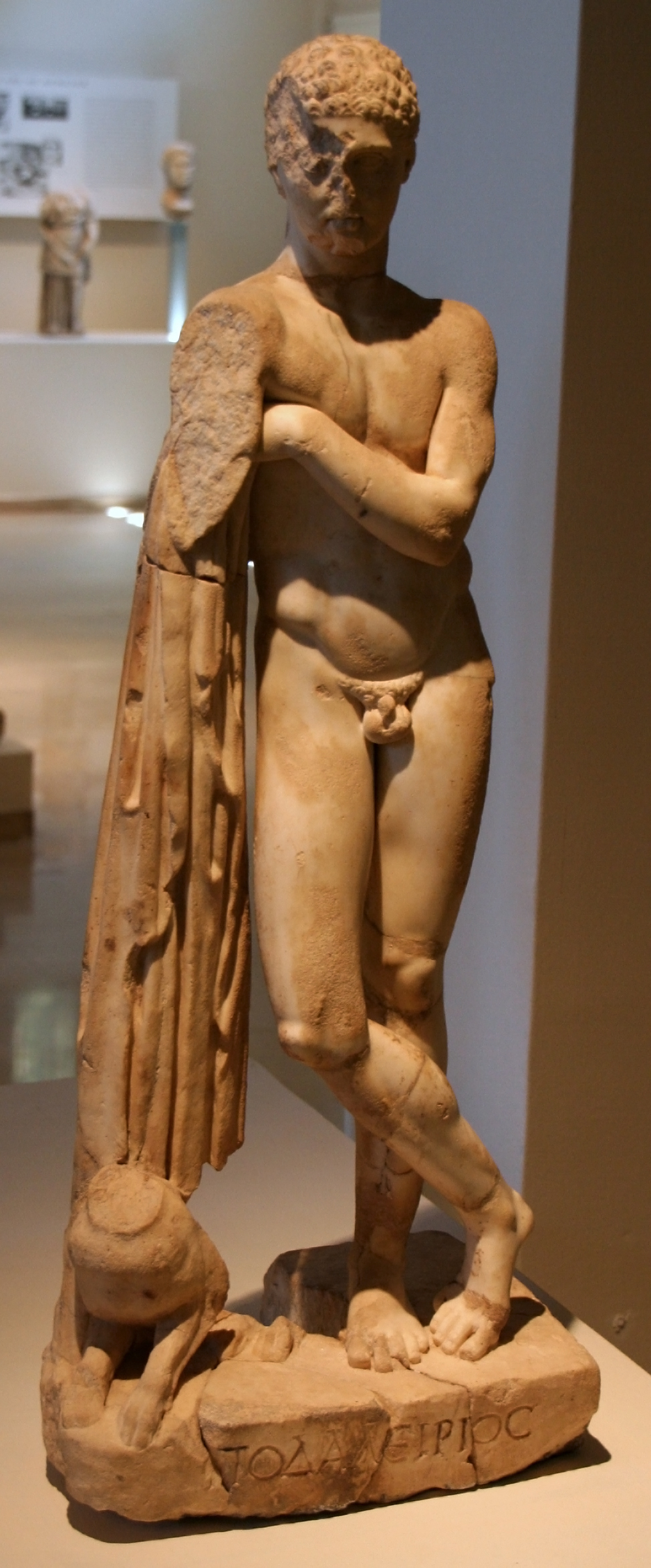
Statue of Podalirius - Archaeological Museum of Dion

In Greek mythology, Podalirius or Podaleirius or Podaleirios (Ancient Greek: Ποδαλείριος) was a son of Asclepius.

== Mythology ==
=== Trojan war ===
With Machaon, his brother, he led thirty ships from Tricca, Thessaly in the Trojan War on the side of the Greeks. Like Machaon, he was a legendary healer. He healed Philoctetes, holder of the bow and arrows of Heracles required to end the war. He was one of those who entered the Trojan Horse. Alongside Amphilochus, Calchas, Leonteus and Polypoetes he traveled to Colophon, where Calchas died.

=== Aftermath ===
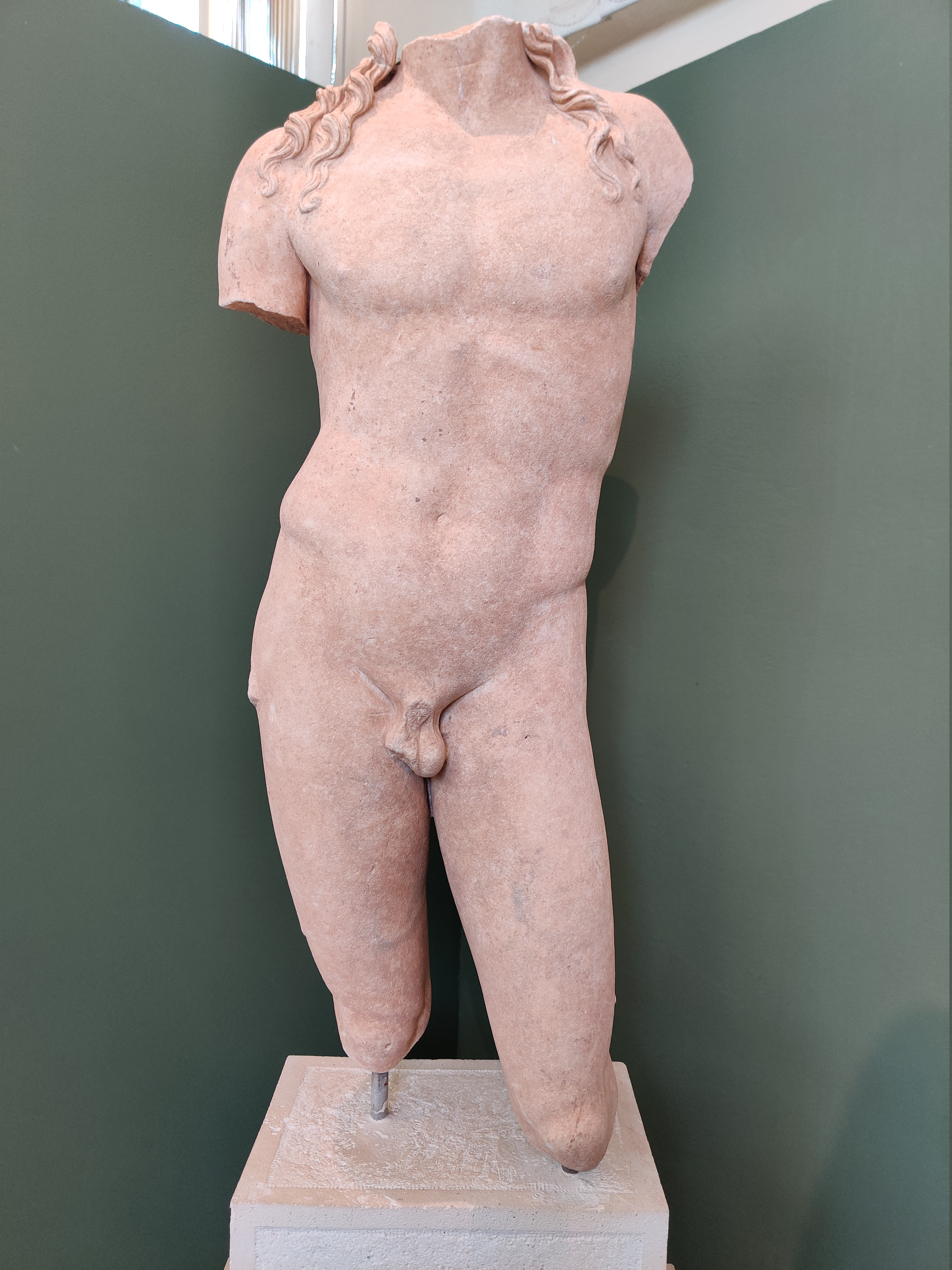
Marble torso from the Asclepieion at the Ancient Messene

Unlike his brother, Podalirius survived the war, and subsequently settled in Caria. Accounts vary as to how he ended up there. According to one version, he returned to Argos after the war but later went on to consult the Delphian oracle about a preferable place for himself to live, and was instructed to stay at a place where he would suffer no harm should the sky fall; thus he chose the Carian peninsula which was surrounded by mountains. Others relate that on the way back from Troy Podalirius' ship was blown off course so he landed in Syrnus, Caria, where he settled. In yet another version, he got shipwrecked near the Carian coast but was rescued by a shepherd named Bybassus, the eponym-to-be of a city in Caria. Podalirus could be the founder of Syrnus, which he became after the following series of events. Podalirius arrived at the court of the Carian king Damaethus and healed the king's daughter Syrna, who had fallen off a roof. In reward, Damaethus gave him Syrna in marriage and handed the power over the peninsula over to him. Podalirus founded two cities, one of which he named Syrnus after his wife and the other Bybassus after the shepherd to whom he owed his life.

According to Strabo, a heroön of Podalirius, and another of Calchas, were located in Daunia, Italy, on a hill known as Drium. By the hero-shrine of Podalirius there flowed a stream believed to cure animals of any diseases. Lycophron writes that Podalirius was buried in Italy near the cenotaph of Calchas, but John Tzetzes accuses him of providing false information and defends the versions cited above.

In the account of Dares the Phrygian, Podalirius is described as "sturdy, strong, haughty, and moody."

== See also ==
- 4086 Podalirius, a Jovian asteroid
- Podalyria, a plant genus in Fabaceae, was named for Podalirius.
- Iphiclides podalirius, the scarce swallowtail butterfly.
