= List of health deities =

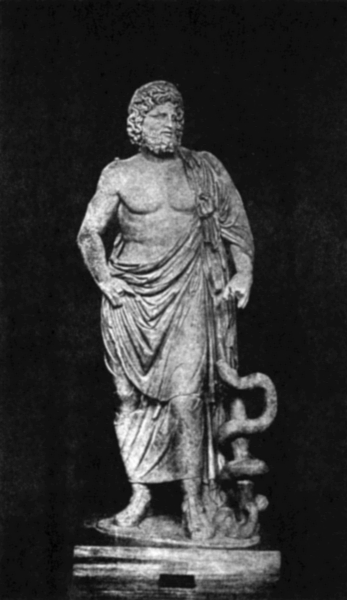
A statue of Asclepius, the Greek god of healing

A health deity is a god or goddess in mythology or religion associated with health, healing and wellbeing. They may also be related to childbirth or Mother Goddesses. They are a common feature of polytheistic religions.

== List of health deities ==
=== African ===
- Jengu, water spirits that bring good fortune and cure disease
- Waaq/Waaqa, sky god that was worshipped by the Somali and Oromo people before Christianity and Islam
- !Xu, sky god of the Bushmen of southern Africa who is invoked in illness
- Sonzwaphi, deity of healing, Zulu mythology

==== Yoruba and Afro-American ====
- Aja, spirit of the forest, the animals within it and herbal healers
- Babalú-Ayé, spirit of illness and disease
- Erinlẹ, spirit of abundance, the healer, and Physician to the Orisha
- Loco, patron of healers and plants
- Mami Wata, a pantheon of water deities associated with healing and fertility
- Ọsanyìn, spirit of herbalism
- Sopona, god of smallpox

=== Albanian ===
- Dielli, the Sun: giver of life, health and energy
- Zjarri, the Fire: purifier, healer, protector, and energizer
- Prende: dawn goddess, goddess of love, beauty, fertility, health and protector of women

=== Armenian ===
- Anahit, goddess of fertility and healing, wisdom and water in Armenian mythology.

=== Aztec ===
- Ixtlilton, god of medicine.
- Patecatl, god of Pulque and healing.

=== Baltic ===
- Aušrinė, Baltic pagan deity of medicine, health and beauty.
- Ragana, witch deity protecting healers and wisdom holders.

=== Buddhist ===
- White Tara, a female Buddha in Vajrayāna Buddhism who is supplicated for longevity.
- Hayagriva, known for curing skin sicknesses particularly skin diseases such as leprosy

=== Celtic ===
- Airmed, Irish goddess associated with healing and resurrection. Daughter of Dian Cecht and sister of Miach.
- Alaunus, Gaulish god of the sun, healing and prophecy associated with Greek god Helios-Apollo
- Atepomarus, Gaulish healing god associated with the Greek god Apollo
- Borvo, Celto-Lusitanian healing god associated with bubbling spring water
- Brigid, Irish goddess associated with healing
- Belenus, Celtic god of fire and healing
- Dian Cecht, Irish god of healing
- Endovelicus, god of public health and safety
- Glanis, Gaulish god associated with a healing spring at the town of Glanum
- Grannus, Gaulish god associated with spas, thermal springs and the sun, regularly identified with Apollo
- Hooded Spirits, hooded deities associated with health and fertility
- Ianuaria, goddess associated with healing
- Iovantucarus, Gaulish healer-god and protector of youth associated with Lenus Mars
- Lenus, Gaulish healing god associated with the Greek god Ares
- Lugh, god of arts, crafts, healing and the Sun. He is associated with Greek god Hermes and Apollo.
- Maponos, god of youth, associated with the Greek god Apollo
- Miach, Irish god associated with healing, herbs, and medicine. Killed by Dian Cecht over jealousy of his superior healing skills.
- Mullo, Gaulish deity associated with the Greek god Ares and said to heal afflictions of the eye
- Nodens, a Roman British god associated with healing, the sea, hunting and dogs
- Sirona, Gallo-Roman and Celto-Germanic goddess associated with healing

=== Chinese ===
- Bao Sheng Da Di, the God of Medicine in Chinese folk religion and Taoism
- Shennong Da Di, one of the Three Sovereigns, also known as the Divine Farmer who acquired and spread knowledge of herbs and medicine
- Hua Tuo (華佗), regarded as "divine physician" in Chinese history and worshipped as a Medicinal Deity
- Taiyi Zhushen, God of Qi
- Taokang Geyan, God of Essence
- Zhang Guolao, one of the Eight Immortals, whose wine was considered to have healing properties
- He Xiangu, one of the Eight Immortals, whose lotus flower improves one's mental and physical health
- Li Tieguai, one of the Eight Immortals, who alleviates the suffering of the poor, sick and needy with special medicine from his gourd
- Wong Tai Sin, a deified Taoist hermit during the Eastern Jin dynasty, known to have the power of healing
- Jiutian Xuannü, goddess of war, sex, and longevity (long life), who is connected to calisthenics, diet, alchemy, neidan (inner alchemy), and physiology

=== Egyptian ===
- Sekhmet, goddess of healing and medicine of Upper Egypt
- Heka, deification of magic, through which Egyptians believed they could gain protection, healing and support
- Serket, goddess of healing stings and bites
- Ta-Bitjet, a scorpion goddess whose blood is a panacea for all poisons
- Isis, goddess of healing, magic, marriage and protection
- Bes, Apotropaic god, represented as a dwarf, particularly important in protecting children and women in childbirth.
- Taweret (Thoeris), Hippopotamus goddess who is often depicted as a protective deity, particularly associated with childbirth, fertility, and motherhood.

=== Etruscan ===
- Fufluns, god of plant life, happiness and health and growth in all things
- Menrva, goddess of war, art, wisdom and healthcare

=== Filipino ===
- Kadaklan: the Itneg deity who is second in rank; taught the people how to pray, harvest their crops, ward off evil spirits, and overcome bad omens and cure sicknesses
- Talanganay: a male Gaddang god-spirit; enters the body of a healer and gives instructions on how to heal the sick while in a trance
- Menalam: a female Gaddang goddess-spirit; enters the body of a healer and gives instructions on how to heal the sick while in a trance
- Cabuyaran: the Ilocano goddess of healing; daughter of Abra and Makiling, the elder; she eloped with Anianihan
- Akasi: the Sambal god of health and sickness; sometimes seen at the same level of power as Malayari
- Lakambini: the Tagalog deity who protects throats and who is invoked to cure throat aches; also called Lakandaytan, as the god of attachment
- Daniw: the Hanunoo Mangyan spirit residing in the stone cared for by the healers
- Hamorawan Lady: the deity of the Hamorawan spring in Borongan, who blesses the waters with healing properties
- Beljan: the Pala'wan spirits of all beljan (shamans); able to travel to the vertical universe, divided into fourteen different layers, in order to heal the world and to re-establish cosmic balance; also referred to as Balyan
- Maguimba: the Batak god in the remotest times, lived among the people, having been summoned by a powerful babaylan (shaman); provided all the necessities of life, as well as all cures for illnesses; has the power to bring the dead back to life
- Ibabasag: the Bukidnon goddess of pregnant women
- Mandarangan: the Bagobo god of warriors married to Darago; resides at Mount Apo's summit; human sacrifices to him are rewarded with health, valor in war, and success in the pursuit of wealth
- Cotabato Healer Monkey: a Maguindanao monkey who lived near a pond outside Cotabato city; it heals those who touch it and those who give it enough offerings
- Pagari: also called Inikadowa, the Maguindanao twin-spirit who is sometimes in the form of a crocodile; if a person is possessed by them, the person will attain the gift of healing

=== Greek ===
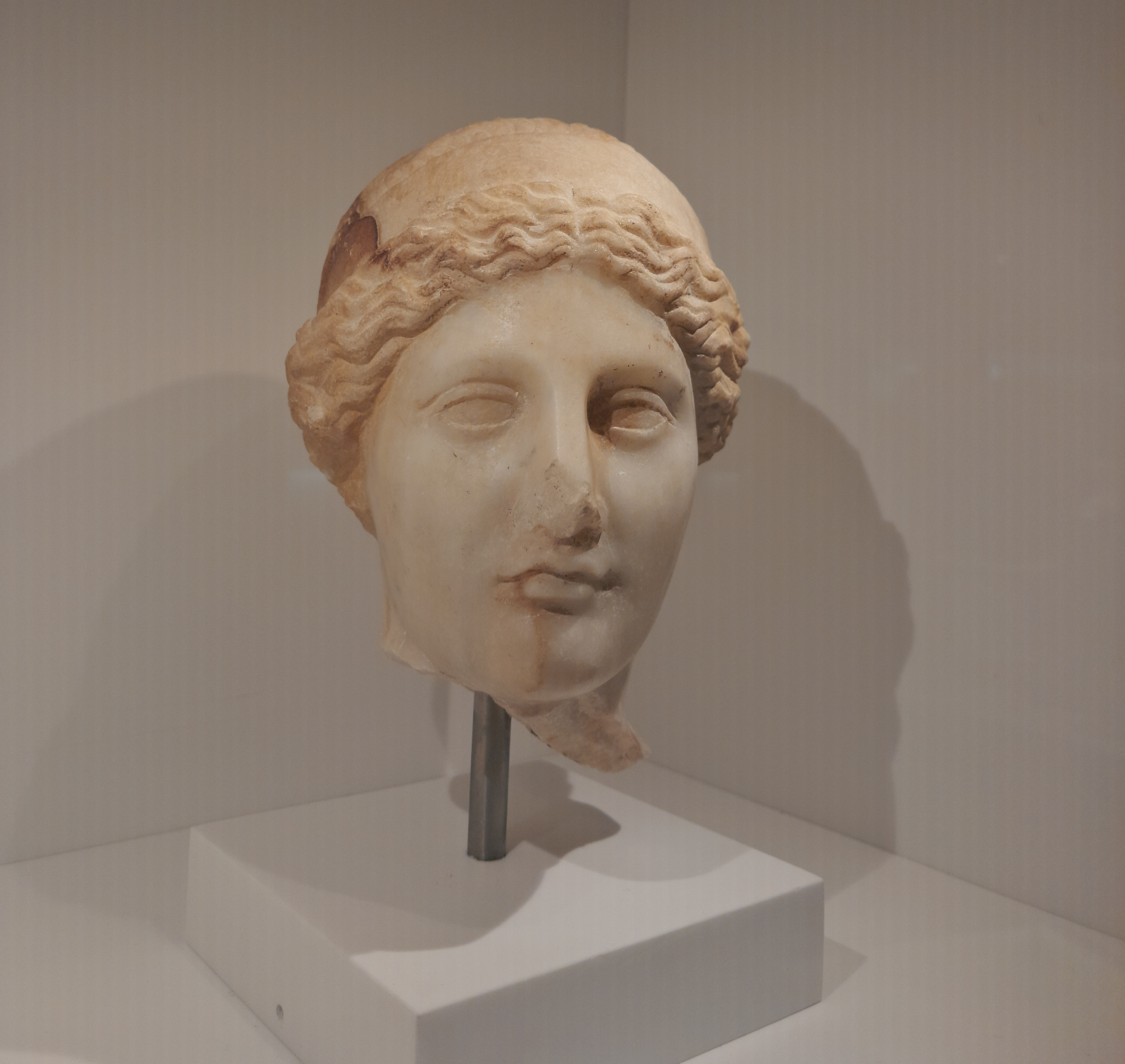
Marble head of Hygieia, c. 50-150 AD, in the Acropolis Museum, Athens.

- Apollo, god of medicine, healing, plagues, diseases and prosperity healing
- Asclepius, god of the medicinal arts
- Artemis, goddess of young women and childbirth
- Chiron, a centaur known for his knowledge and skill in medicinal arts
- Darrhon, a health god worshipped in Macedon
- Eileithyia, goddess of childbirth
- Epione, goddess of the soothing of pain
- Aceso, goddess of curing sickness and healing wounds
- Aegle, goddess of radiant good health
- Hera, goddess of childbirth; she was called upon for women's safety during childbirth and for good health of the infants
- Heracles Apotropaios, god of strength and athletes; he was trained in medicine and called on to avert plagues.
- Hygieia, goddess of cleanliness and sanitation
- Iaso, goddess of cures and remedies
- Paean, physician of the gods, who was later syncretized with Apollo
- Panacea, goddess of the cure by medicines and salves
- Prothyraia, goddess of childbirth, identified with Artemis and Eileithyia
- Telesphorus, demi-god of convalescence

=== Hindu ===
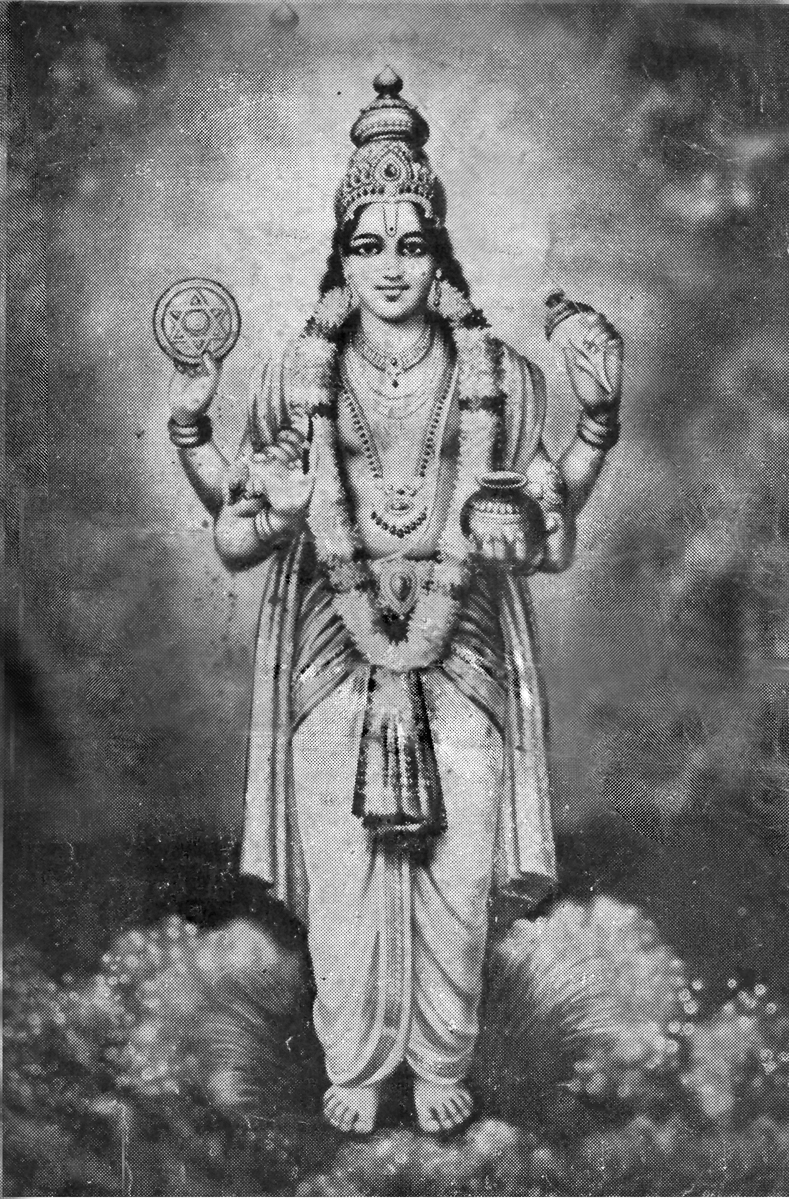
Dhanvantari, the Hindu physician of the gods and god of Ayurveda

- Ashvins, the twin gods of medicine
- Dhanvantari, physician of the gods and god of Ayurvedic medicine
- Vaidhynatha, one of form of shiva for healing
- Bhumi, the goddess of the earth
- Lakshmi, goddess of prosperity
- Mariamman, folk goddess of rain, medicine, and plagues
- Shitala, folk goddess of smallpox and disease
- Jvarasura, the embodiment of fever
- Paranashavari, goddess of diseases

=== Hittite ===
- Kamrusepa, goddess of healing, medicine, and magic

=== Hurrian ===
- Shaushka, goddess of love, war, and healing

=== Igbo ===
- Agwu Nsi, the patron spirit of the dibia (diviner-healer)

=== Inuit ===
- Eeyeekalduk, god of medicine and good health
- Pinga, goddess of the hunt, fertility and medicine

=== Japanese ===
- Ashitekōjin, god of hands and feet
- Sukunahikona, god of medicine, as well as nation building, incantation, agriculture and hot springs
- Dōsojin, gods of boundaries, roads, travellers, villagers, marriage, fertility, procreation, health, defense, guardianship and protection

=== Maya ===
- Ixchel, jaguar goddess of midwifery and medicine
- Maximón, hero god of health

=== Mesopotamian ===
- Namtar, god of death and disease
- Ninazu, god of the underworld and healing
- Ningishzida, god of the underworld and patron of medicine
- Ninti, Sumerian goddess of healing
- Ninisina, divine physician, worshiped in Isin
- Ninkarrak, divine physician, worshiped in Sippar and Terqa
- Nintinugga, divine physician, worshiped in Nippur
- Damu, son and assistant of Ninisina
- Gula, a Mesopotamian goddess of medicine, portrayed as a divine physician and midwife. She is also a goddess of healing and the healing arts.

=== Native American ===
- Kumugwe, Kwakwakaʼwakw underwater god with the power to see into the future, heal the sick and injured, and bestow powers on those whom he favors
- Angak, a Hopi kachina spirit, represents a healing and protective male figure.

=== Norse ===
- Eir, goddess associated with medical skill

=== Ossetian ===
- Alardy, god who heals skin diseases

=== Persian ===
- Haoma, god of health

=== Phoenician ===
- Eshmun, god of healing

=== Roman ===
- Angitia, snake goddess associated with magic and healing
- Apollo, Greco-Roman god of light, music, healing, and the sun
- Bona Dea, goddess of fertility, healing, virginity, and women
- Cardea, goddess of health, thresholds and door hinges and handles
- Carna, goddess who presided over the heart and other organs
- Endovelicus, god of public health and safety
- Febris, goddess who embodied and protected people from fever and malaria
- Feronia, goddess of wildlife, fertility, health, and abundance
- Valetudo, Roman name for the Greek goddess Hygieia, goddess of health, cleanliness, and hygiene
- Vejovis, god of healing
- Verminus, god who protected cattle from disease

=== Sami ===
- Beiwe, goddess of the sun, spring, fertility and sanity, who restored the mental health of those driven mad by the darkness of the winter
- Biejjenniejte, goddess of medicine and healing

=== Slavic ===
- Żywie, goddess of health and healing

=== Sumerian ===
- Gula, a goddess of healing, medicine and healing arts
- Damu, god of healing

=== Thracian ===
- Derzelas, god of abundance and the underworld, health and human spirit's vitality

=== Turkic ===
- Akbugha, god of medicine. He is the god of health and healing in ancient Turkic tradition. He has a white serpent.

== In monotheistic religion ==
=== Christianity and Islam ===
According to the Gospels, Jesus performed miracles during his earthly life as he traveled through Galilee, Judea, and Jerusalem. The miracles performed by Jesus are mentioned in two sections of the Qur'an (Sura 3:49 and 5: 110) in general, with few details or comments. One of the greatest miracles Jesus performed was healing (Blind, Leprous, Paralytic, Epileptic, Healing a Bleeding Woman, etc.), the Gospels provide different amounts of detail for each episode, at other times he uses materials such as spit and mud. In general, they are mentioned in the Synoptic Gospels, but not in the Gospel of John. Luke, one of the apostles, was a physician (Greek for "one who heals").

Jesus endorsed the use of the medical assistance of the time (medicines of oil and wine) when he told the parable of the Good Samaritan (Luke 10:25–37), who "bound up [an injured man's] wounds, pouring on oil and wine" (verse 34) as a physician would. Jesus then told the doubting teacher of the law (who had elicited this parable by his self-justifying question, "And who is my neighbor?" in verse 29) to "go, and do likewise" in loving others with whom he would never ordinarily associate (verse 37).

In 1936, Ludwig Bieler argued that Jesus was stylized in the New Testament in the image of the "divine man" (Greek: theios aner), which was widespread in antiquity. It is said that many of the famous rulers and elders of the time had divine healing powers.

Archangel Raphael, is known to be the primary angel of healing. His name is derived from Hebrew, רָפָאֵל (Rafa'el), which means "God has healed", "God heals" or simply "it is God who has healed". The name is derived from two Hebrew words: רָפָא (rafa'), meaning "to heal," and אֵל ('el), meaning "God". He was first mentioned in the Book of Tobit and in 1 Enoch. He is mentioned throughout various traditions from Judaism, Christianity, and Islam. People would pray to Raphael for healing and guidance. He is the patron of travelers, the blind, those who need healing, and many more.

== See also ==
- List of deities
- God of medicine
- Fertility deity
