= Pudicitia =

Concept in ancient Roman ethic

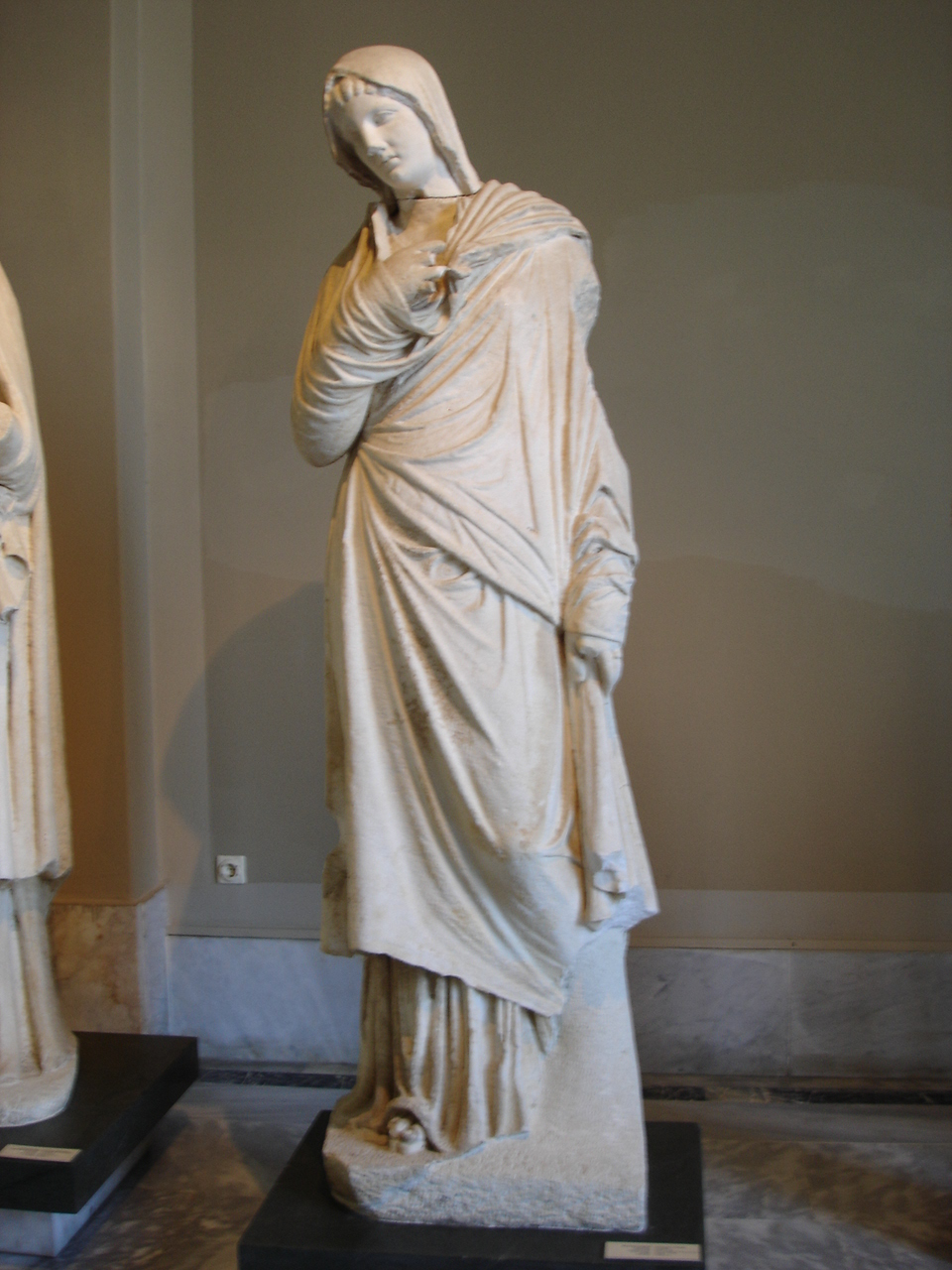
Statue of a woman, perhaps the empress Vibia Sabina, dressed as Pudicitia

In ancient Roman culture and religion, Pudicitia ('modesty' or 'sexual virtue') was a virtue and central concept in Roman sexual ethics. Pudicitia was a defining characteristic of proper female sexuality, and embodied ideals such as modesty and loyalty.

Virtues the Romans believed to be key to the success of the Empire were personified as deities and bestowed with imperial cults, temples, and festivals. The goddess Pudicitia was worshipped as the protectress of women's pudicitia, and had two dedicated temples in Rome: the Temple of Pudicitia Patricia and the Temple of Pudicitia Plebeia.

== Etymology ==
The word pudicitia emerges from the Latin verb pudere ('to be ashamed') and the noun pudor ('shame' or 'modesty'), which ultimately derive from the verb pudet ('it shames'). Pudor was largely employed by authors to refer to those who lived with restraint.

== As virtue ==
Pudicitia was a complex virtue explored by many ancient writers, including Livy, Valerius Maximus, Cicero, Tacitus and Tertullian. The philosopher Seneca wrote that the loveliest beauty and maximum decus ('greatest glory') a woman could have was her pudicitia, and the author Valerius Maximus wrote that it was the principal virtue underpinning the lives of men, women, and Rome itself. Pudicitia was used in different ways, sometimes referring to a moral quality, and sometimes referring to the physical state of sexual purity. Romans idealized the woman who was univira ('one-man woman'), even though divorce was common by the time of Cicero and Julius Caesar. An univira represented good fortune, and embodied what the Romans considered to be the ideal matrona ('married woman').

Married plebeian and patrician women were expected to wholly embody and radiate the virtue both in private and public. It was important that a woman's pudicitia be conspicua ('evident'): easily seen and experienced by others. Multiple authors, including Seneca and Propertius, believed that a woman did not need to do her hair or wear makeup, jewelry, or fancy clothes if she had pudicitia— it alone would be enough to make her beautiful. However, while women had to be publicly recognized for their efforts, they could not attract gossip. Fama ('rumor') was frequently cited as the downfall of a pudicae ('chaste woman'). Women could compete in pudicitia; Valerius Maximus claimed that a corona pudicitiae ('crown of pudicitia') was awarded to women deemed to be outstanding.

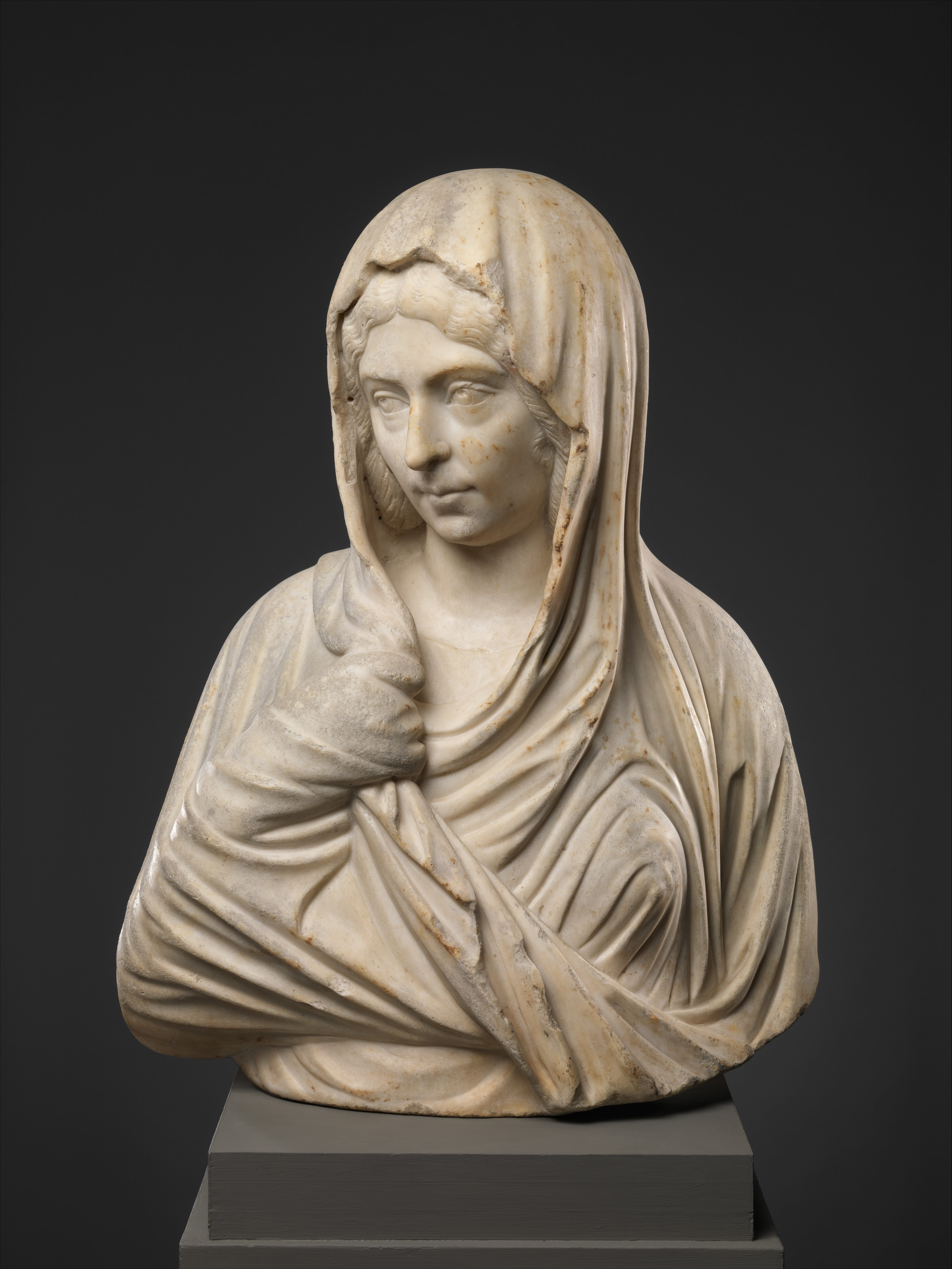
Bust of a modest Roman woman from the Severan Period (193-211 CE). Held at the Metropolitan Museum of Art in New York

Livy described the legendary figure of Lucretia, who stayed loyal to her husband even as she was raped by Tarquin, as the epitome of pudicitia. Ovid held up Quinta Claudia as a beacon of the virtue; she had her reputation unfairly tarnished by gossips, but restored her good standing and made her pudicitia publicly known after bringing Cybele's cult to Rome.

=== Impudicitia ===
While both men and women were beholden to pudicitia, only freemen could violate the pudicitia of others, while freeborn women (ingenua) and boys (ingenui) had pudicitia that could be violated by others. Violated pudicitia— whether by oneself or by others— was impudicitia ('shamelessness' or 'sexual vice'). Women could display impudicitia through both their dress and behavior. Cited examples include dressing immodestly, donning an alluring expression, speaking wittily, and flirting. However, even more minor infractions could stain a woman's pudicitia. Valerius Maximus described a woman who was divorced for leaving the house with her head uncovered, which her husband alleged was to display her beauty to other men; other women were divorced for similar reasons: one for publicly speaking to a woman with a poor reputation, and another for going to the games without her husband's permission.

A famous example of impudicitia was Tarpeia, a Vestal Virgin who betrayed Rome to the Sabines either in exchange for jewelry or due to her illicit love for the Sabine king Titus Tatius.

==== Stuprum ====
A stuprum ('sex crime') was a type of sexual offense in ancient Rome. It generally referred to acts of coerced or illicit sexual activity involving freeborn women, including adultery. Stuprum were considered a form of impudicitia: both the assailant and a male chaperone found guilty of not protecting the victim's pudicitia could be charged under Roman law. It is unclear if a woman's pudicitia and social standing could be fully restored after being victimized, or if her reputation was permanently damaged. Properitus claimed pudicitia as a form of beauty that attracted those who wished to destroy it; resultantly, only women who were victims of sex crimes— such as Lucretia and Verginia— could become exemplum for chaste puella ('girls').

== As goddess ==
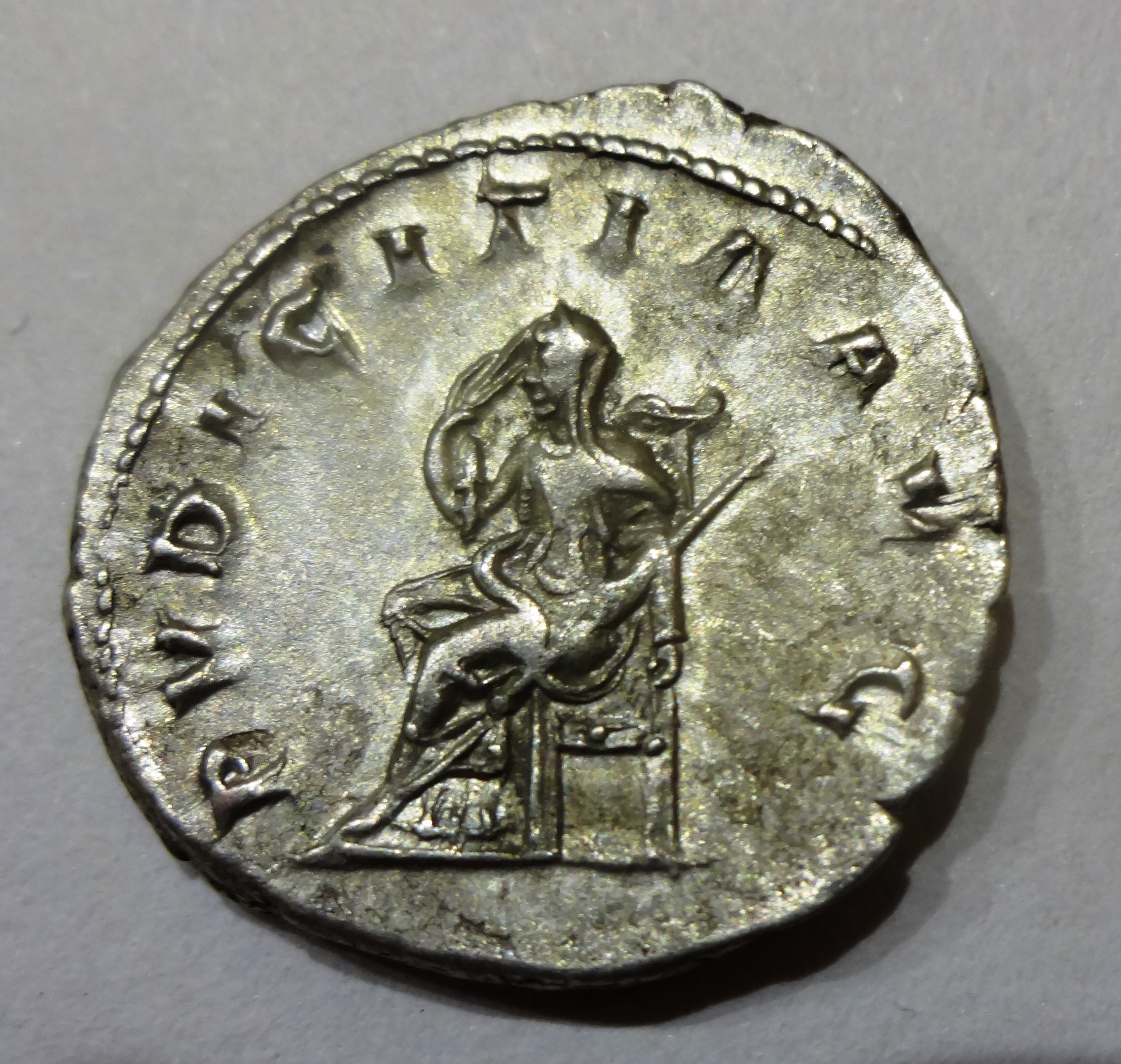
Pudicitia depicted on the reverse of an antoninianus minted in honor of Empress Herennia Etruscilla

Starting in the late 1st century CE, images of a personified Pudicitia began to appear on coins minted by the imperial family. A number of emperors— including Septimus Severus, Volusian, Decius, and Hostilian— issued coins with the goddess on the reverse. Hadrian also issued coins depicting the goddess, but was the only emperor to claim pudicitia as a personal virtue. More commonly, women of the imperial family, primarily empresses, minted coins with Pudicitia on the reverse. This practice was popular, and Pudicitia appeared on coins in honor of Lucilla, Julia Domna, Faustina, and Julia Maesa. By associating themselves with the goddess, the empresses demonstrated the purity of their character to the Roman people.

On coins minted in the 2nd and 3rd centuries CE, Pudicitia was commonly pictured wearing a stola— a garment traditionally worn by married Roman women— and in the action of drawing a veil over her face. An early imperial declaration recommended that matronae dress similarly to protect their pudicitia.

=== Functions ===
The 1st century author Valerius Maximus described her as a goddess who defended children, youths, and married women. However, Pudicitia was not the only deity who presided over pudicitia; the goddesses Juno and Vesta were also considered protectors of women's chastity and upheld strict moral codes. Valerius drew a connection between the three goddesses, and described Pudicitia lying on Juno's sacred couch and residing at Vesta's hearth. Ovid similarly depicted Pudicitia as a guardian; In his Fasti, he described Pudicitia watching over womens' forma ('beauty'), mores ('morality'), and bona fama ('good reputation').

According to Juvenal, at the end of the Iron Age, humanity had grown so cruel and greedy that Pudicitia, along with her sister Astraea, goddess of justice, abandoned the earth and returned to the heavens, leaving humans to deal with their evil unguided.

=== Worship ===
Roman historians Livy and Festus described two separate sacellum ('shrines') dedicated to the goddess in Rome. One was the older Temple of Pudicitia Patricia near the Temple of Hercules in the Forum Boarium, and the second was the Temple of Pudicitia Plebeia along the Vicus Longus. Both authors wrote that only married women in their first marriage (univirae) could participate in the goddess' rituals. However, no written account of the cult or the aforementioned rituals has survived. While univirae were not the only Romans who could cultivate pudicitia, their key role in the goddess' rites suggests that they were believed to have a special relationship with the virtue.

Livy described the origins of the two temples in his Ab Urbe Condita. A dispute arose in 296 BCE after Verginia, a patrician woman who had married a plebeian, was barred by the matronae from participating in the goddess' rites. She then established a small sanctuary dedicated to the goddess along the Vicus Longus where she lived. The new temple carried out the same rites, and was only open to univirae of good pudicitia. Later, the temple was abandoned after women of questionable morals began to worship there and defiled its sacred character.

== See also ==
- Virtus
- Pietas
- Fides
- Salus
- Aidos
