= Febris =

Roman goddess of fever

- Goddess of fevers
- Member of Dii averrunci, Di indigetes
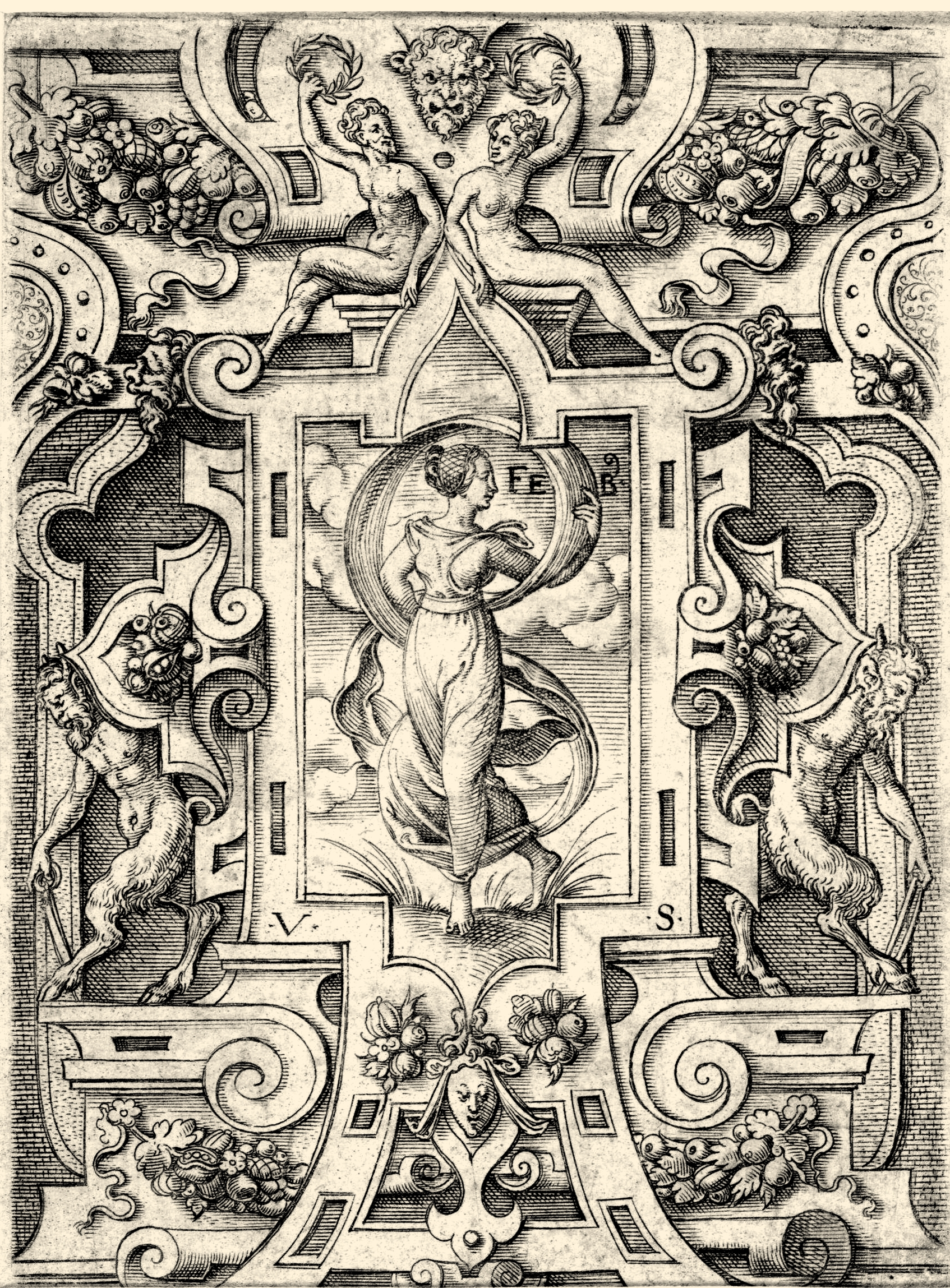
- Febris, print by Virgil Solis, from his Twelve mythological women series
- Other names: Dea Febris
- Major cult center: Rome
- Predecessor: Februus
- Gender: Female
- Region: Ancient Rome
- Ethnic group: Romans
- Offspring: Dea Tertiana; Dea Quartana

Equivalents
- Greek: Pyretos (Note: Pyretos was the Late Greek translation of the goddess, rather than a separate god on his own.)
- Hindu: Jvarasura
- Finnish: Kuume (spirits related to fevers)

Febris (lit. 'fever'), or Dea Febris (lit. 'goddess of fever'), is the Roman goddess of fevers, who embodied, but also protected people from, fever and malaria. Because of this, Febris was a feared goddess whom people wanted the favour of. She does not have a myth of her own nor is she mentioned in a myth. Among her characteristic attributes are "shrewdness" and "honesty", according to Seneca the Younger's Apocolocyntosis.

Febris was accompanied by two daughters or sisters of hers named Dea Tertiana and Dea Quartana, the goddesses of tertian and quartan fever of malaria because the fever would come back in every three or four days. Theodorus Priscianus mentions Saturn as Tertiana and Quartana's father.

The goddess Febris belongs to the apotropaic (turning away) deities (Lat. Dii averrunci) who have power over a specific evil: to impose it or to get rid of it. Romans worshipped Febris so she would not do harm to them. She may have originated from the Etruscan-Roman god of purification, Februus. Unlike some Roman deities, Febris was not derived from a Greek deity.

== Name ==
Febris is the Latin word for fever which the English word "fever" has originated from. The word febris is from Proto-Italic *feɣʷris, from Proto-Indo-European *dʰegʷʰris (which is an extension of the root *dʰegʷʰ- meaning “to burn, warm”). Her name is often translated to English as Fever.

Some of Juno's epithets are spelt similarly to Febris' name, such as Februalis, Februata, Februa which are also of the same etymological root as febris.

== Cult ==
Febris had at least three temples in ancient Rome, of which one was located between the Palatine and Velabrum. The second temple was on the Esquiline and the last on the Vicus Longus. Febris' temples were visited by people with fevers. In those temples, people wore protective amulets against diseases, especially malaria at the time. She was invoked with the formula Febris diva, Febris sancta, Febris magna (Divine Fever, Holy Fever, Great Fever). An inscription, which was later revealed to be a possible forgery, saying Febri Divae, Febri Sanctae, Febri Magnae, Camilla Amata pro filio male affecto was discovered in Transylvania.

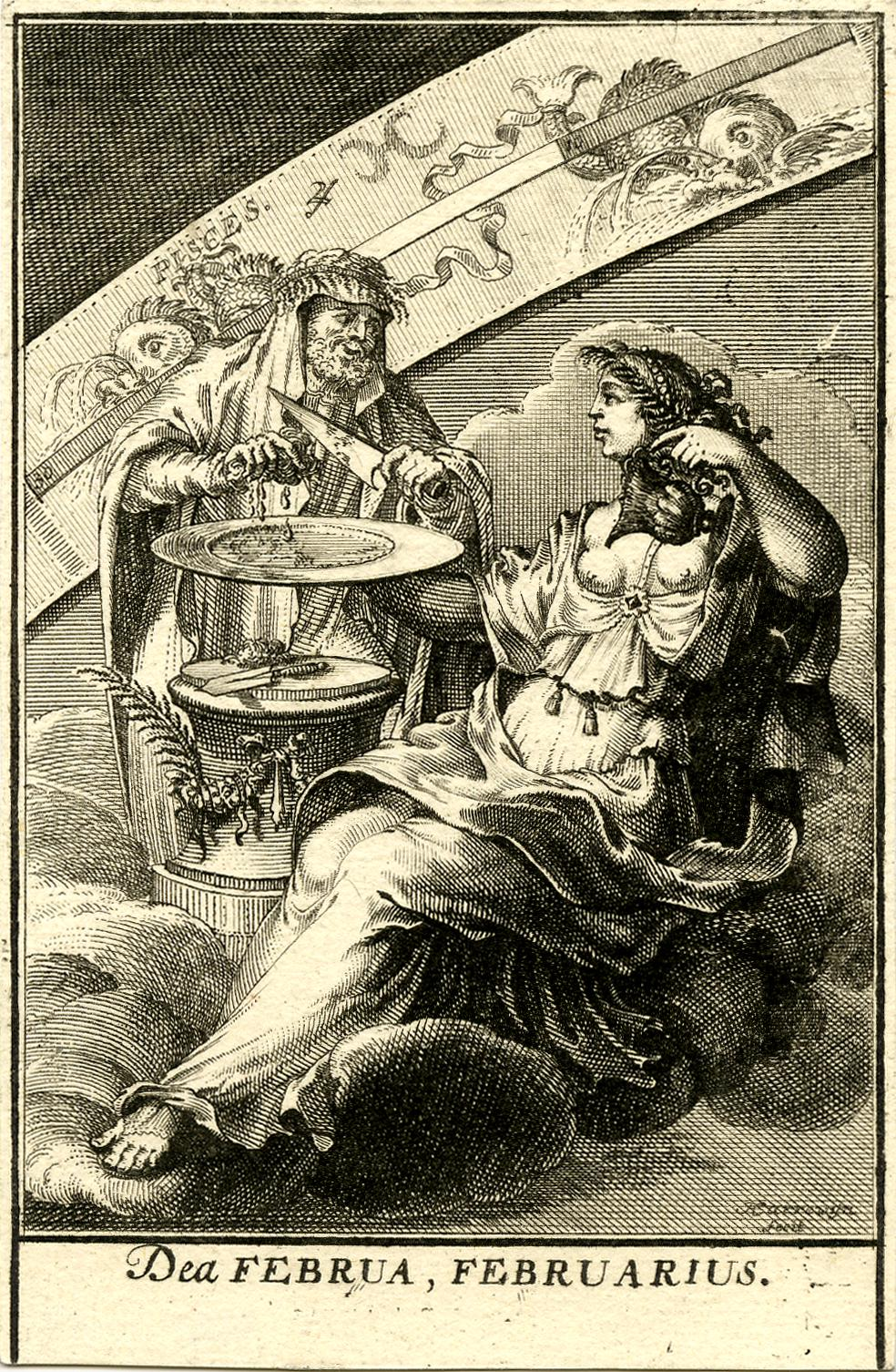
Goddess figure, possibly Febris

An inscription dedicated to Quartana in Nemausus, Gaul, dated to the third century (CIL 12.3129) and another inscription dedicated to Tertiana in Habitancum (Risingham), Northern England (CIL 7.999) were discovered.

The Ancient Greeks under Roman rule may have worshipped a similar fever god named Pyretos (Πυρετός, (Note: Unlike the Latin word for fever febris, which is feminine, the Greek word for fever πυρετός is masculine. This explains why the Greek fever deity would be male.) lit. 'fever'), the analogous translation of the Roman goddess Febris. Febris might have been worshipped in the Medieval-era Christian Rome disguised under the name Madonna delle Febbri (or della Febbre) as one of her temples is known to be converted into a church. The cult of Febris could be as old as the Roman civilisation.

== In literature ==
=== Apocolocyntosis ===
Febris appears with Hercules in the sixth part of Apocolocyntosis. She reveals that Claudius was a "German Gaul" and a liar along with many other things about him when Claudius lied to Jupiter about himself. This made Emperor Claudius angry, Claudius expressed his wrath by shouting unintelligible words that nobody understood, except for the order by a hand gesture for Febris to be beheaded. However, his wish was dismissed.

=== Poliziano's In Albieram Albitiam puellam formosissimam morientem (1473) ===
Febris was included as a character in the Italian poet Angelo Poliziano's Latin work In Albieram Albitiam puellam formosissimam morientem. Poliziano's Febris is his own fictional depiction rather than an actual mythological depiction.

Febris appears to a dying young woman named Albiera degli Albizzi. Despite never being physically described previously, Poliziano depicted Febris holding a torch in one hand and a snowball in the other, in a chariot drawn by monster-like lions which was accompanied by a train of monsters. She was described as looking "gruesome", similar to Erinyes, as opposed to the beauty of Albiera degli Albizzi. She gives a deadly poison to sick Albizzi after saying "those who live sweet, die sweet" and then flies away with the lions.

== See also ==
- Februus
- Jvarasura; god of fever and disease in Hindu mythology
- List of health deities
