= Sheetla Devi Temple =

Hindu temple

- शीतला देवी मंदिर
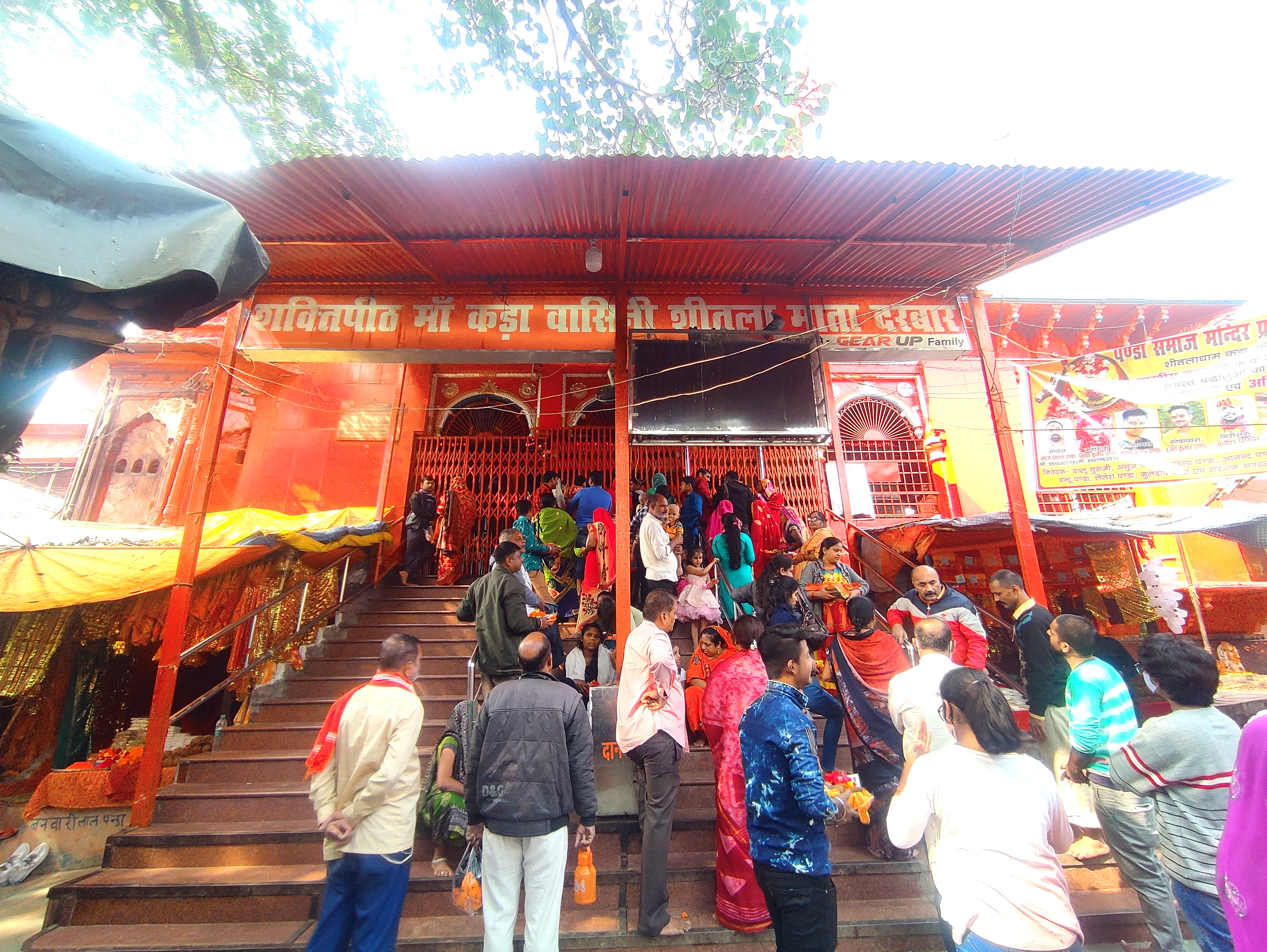
- Sheetla Devi Mandir in Kaushambi, Uttar Pradesh

Religion
- Affiliation: Hinduism
- District: Kaushambi
- Deity: Sheetala
- Festival: Navaratri
- Status: Active

Location
- Location: Kaushambi, Uttar Pradesh
- State: Uttar Pradesh
- Country: India

Sheetla Devi Temple is a Hindu temple dedicated to the mother goddess Sheetla, located in Gurugram, Haryana. It is one of the 51 Shakta pithas in Shaktism denomination of Hinduism. The deity of the temple is regarded as the Kuldevi of gurgaon.

== Mythology ==
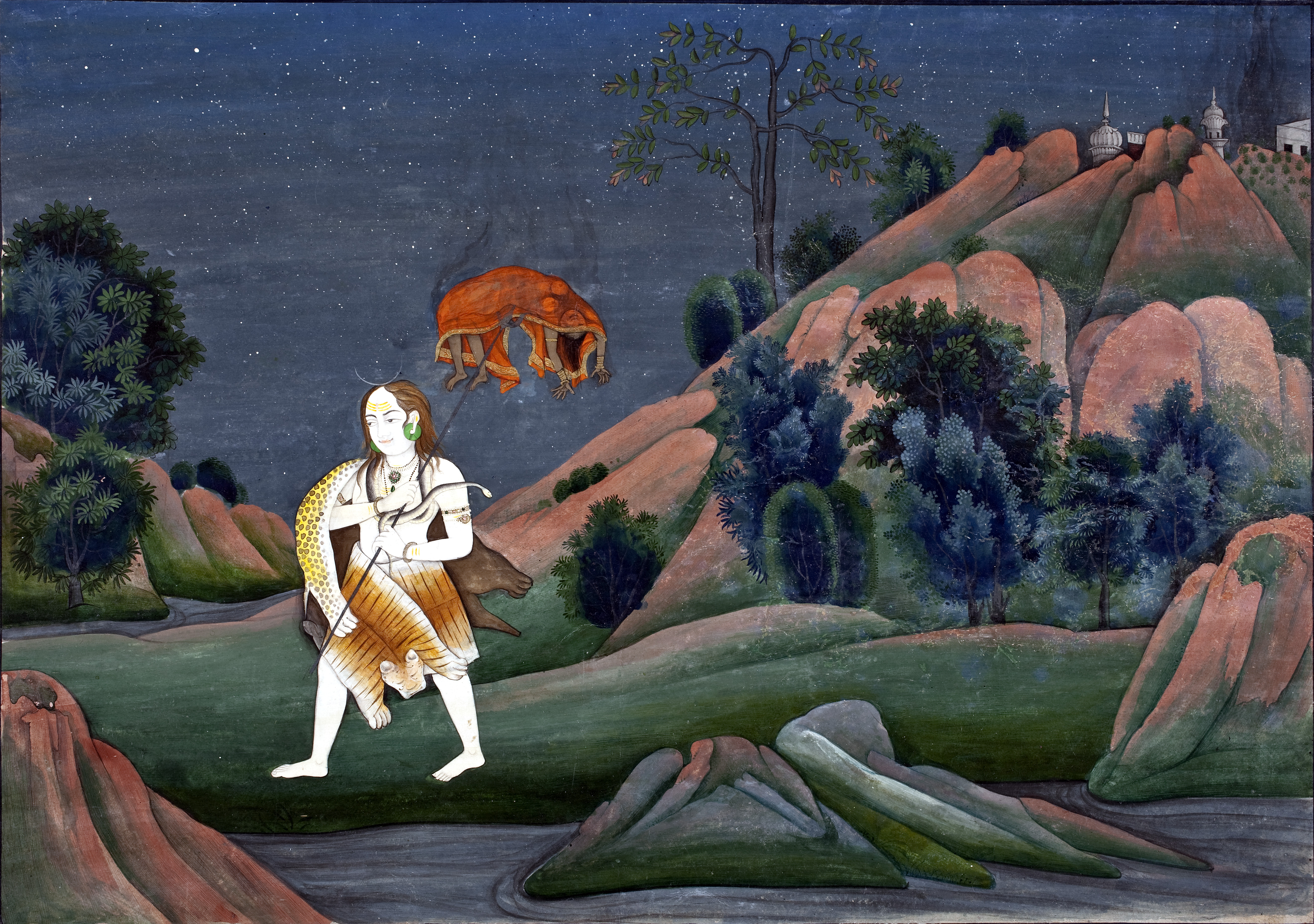
Shiva carrying the corpse of Sati Devi

Sheetla Dham Kadapeeth has been the center of Shakti worshipers for hundreds of years. According to Skanda Purana, when Lord Shiva's wife Sati unable to tolerate the insult by her father Daksha, she jumped into the Yajna Kunda and gave up her life. Lord Shiva, enraged by her separation, started traveling in all the worlds with the dead body of Sati. Seeing Shiva angry, there was a stir in all three worlds. God, humans and all the creatures got scared. Then to avoid the wrath of Shiva, Lord Vishnu cut the dead body of Goddess Sati into 51 pieces with his Sudarshan Chakra. Wherever these pieces of Sati's dead body fell, a Shaktipeeth was established there. Kada Dham is the place where Sati's hand or bangle (Kada) fell.

It is believed that in Dvapara Yuga, Pandu's son Yudhishthira came to visit the temple during his exile. He built the temple of Shitla Devi on the shore of the Ganges and established the Mahakaleshwar Shivling. It is believed that evil forces can be warded off if Goddess Sheetla is worshiped on the Ashtami of Krishna Paksha in the month of Chaitra. This temple was built in 1000 AD.

== Accessibility ==
Kada Dham Sheetla Mata's temple is connected by rail. Sirathu is the main railway station here, from where the distance of the temple is 10 km. Apart from this, you can reach here directly by bus from many cities of Uttar Pradesh. One has to reach Saini by bus, from where the distance of the temple is 8 km. One can get there by taxi or auto from the railway station and Saini. Prayagraj is the nearest airport connected to many cities in India. The temple is located at a distance of 70 km from Prayagraj.

== Tourism ==
This temple of Maa Sheetla is an important attraction for domestic and foreign tourists. The region was ruled by several ruling Hindu dynasties from the medieval era. Tourists also visit the ruins of the fort of Raja Jayachandra, the last ruler of Kannauj. A large number of tourists come to visit this place.

== Fairs and events ==
A seven-day fair is held annually on the Saptami-Ashtami of the month of Ashadha and Sawan. A large number of devotees visit the temple on the occasion of Navaratri. People visit the temple to perform the Mundan rites of their children. Along with this, newly married couples seek the goddess's blessings. A large crowd of devotees visit the temple on Fridays and Mondays throughout the year. A tank is situated in the temple, in which devotees offer water, milk, fruits or dry fruits. They believe that the mother fulfills all their wishes by doing this.

=== Gardabh Mela ===
The two-day Gardabh Mela (donkey fair) is organised annually on the temple premises. The fair facilitates the buying and selling of animals, especially donkeys, mules and horses. The donkeys are believed to be the mount of Sheetala Devi. Hence donkeys are fed delicacies and decorated before being displayed for sale. As per the belief, the worship of Sheetla Devi is considered incomplete until the devotees feed them with milk, grams, green grass and vegetables. It is believed that the donkey will fulfil their desires if satisfied with their services. As per the belief, marriages fixed at this fair are blessed.

== See also ==
- Shakta pithas
