= Shitala Mata Dham =

Hindu Temple in Uttar Pradesh, India

Shitala Mata Dham or Shitala Mata Mandir is located near Mata Pokhara, Mau in Uttar Pradesh state of India. Shitala is an ancient folk deity widely worshipped by many faiths in North India, Nepal, Bangladesh and Pakistan as the Pox Goddess. It is believed that she is the Goddess of sores, ghouls, pustules and diseases.
