= Neria gens =

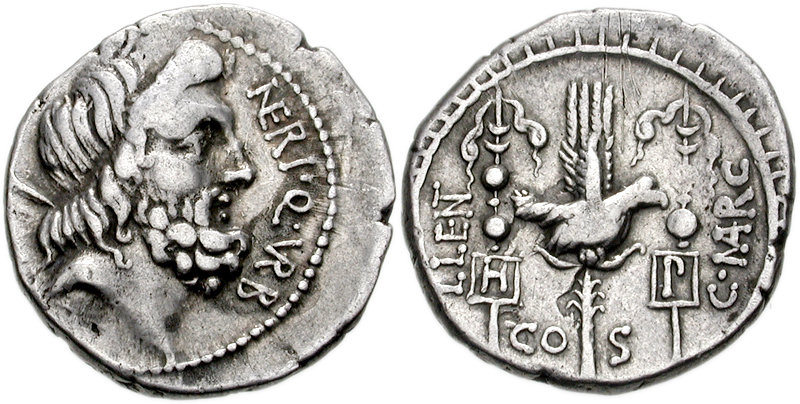
Denarius of Gnaeus Nerius, 49 BC. The obverse depicts Saturn, in whose temple the standards of the legions were kept. The reverse shows an aquila between two standards, inscribed H for Hastati and P for Principes, and the names of the consuls.

The gens Neria was a minor plebeian family at Rome. Members of this gens are first mentioned in the time of Caesar, when Gnaeus Nerius was quaestor, but few if any others are known to have held Roman magistracies. Many Nerii are known from inscriptions. A coin issued by the quaestor Nerius depicts the head of Saturn on the obverse, and standards labeled with the names of the consuls on the reverse, perhaps alluding to Caesar having broken open the treasury, or showing the legitimacy of the Senate to the legions against the rebellion of Caesar.

== Origin ==
The nomen Nerius is identical to, and probably derived from, the Umbrian or Sabine praenomen Nerius or Nero, which was traditionally described as meaning fortis ac strenuus, "strong and sturdy". This would seem to indicate that the Nerii were probably of Umbrian or Sabine origin. Such an origin is supported by an inscription from Capua, mentioning an Ovius Nerius, Ovius being a common Oscan praenomen.

== Praenomina ==
The Nerii used a wide variety of praenomina, such as Lucius, Gaius, Titus, Gnaeus, Publius, Quintus, Marcus, Sextus, and Aulus, all of which were common throughout Roman history. The frequency with which some of these were used may have been increased by the number of freedmen of the gens, since a manumitted slave typically assumed both the praenomen and nomen of his former master. The surviving inscriptions also include one example of Numerius, a less common praenomen, and Ovius, an Oscan praenomen, presumably belonging to a Sabine or Samnite member of the family.

== Members ==
This list includes abbreviated praenomina. For an explanation of this practice, see filiation.

- Gnaeus Nerius, as quaestor urbanus in 49 BC, had charge of the aerarium, the treasury of the Republic, where the standards were kept, as part of the Temple of Saturn. He may be the same Gnaeus Nerius who in 56 BC accused Publius Sestius of bribery; Sestius was successfully defended by Cicero in his oration, Pro Sestio. He supported Pompeius during the Civil War.
- Lucius Nerius Cresces, buried at Satafis in Mauretania Caesariensis, aged thirty.
- Gaius Nerius M. l., a freedman mentioned in an inscription from Delos.
- Lucius Nerius M. l., a freedman mentioned in an inscription from Capua.
- Publius Nerius P. l., a freedman mentioned in an inscription from Capua.
- Gaius Nerius M. l., a freedman mentioned in an inscription from Capua.
- Ovius Nerius, the father of Marcus.
- Marcus Nerius Ovi f., mentioned in an inscription from Capua.
- Titus Nerius T. l. Antigonus, a freedman mentioned in an inscription from Corduba.
- Titus Nerius T. l. Hilarus, a freedman mentioned in an inscription from Corduba.
- Neria T. l. Daphne, a freedwoman, mentioned in an inscription from Corduba.
- Neria T. l. Firma, a freedwoman, daughter of Neria Daphne, mentioned in an inscription from Corduba.
- Titus Nerius T. l. Asiaticus, a freedman, mentioned in an inscription from Corduba.
- Quintus Nerius Fortunatus, mentioned in an inscription from Scupi in Moesia Superior.
- Numerius Nerius Hyginus, named in an inscription from Pompeii.
- Gaius Nerius Pannuchus, probably a freedman, was the husband of Neria Filenis, and the father of Philemon.
- Neria Filenis, probably a freedwoman, was the wife of Gaius Nerius Pannuchus, and the mother of Philemon.
- Gaius Nerius Philemon, son of Gaius Nerius Pannuchus and Neria Filenis, buried at Rome, aged three years, eight months.
- Lucius Nerius, mentioned in an inscription from Rome.
- Marcus Nerius M. l. Quadratus, a freedman named in an inscription from Rome, was a goldsmith along the Vicus Longus.
- Quintus Nerius Capito, erected a monument to his beloved Julia Dynamis at Rome.
- Gaius Nerius Florus, erected a monument to his wife, Plotia Acra, at Rome.
- Nerius Hiero, probably a freedman, buried at Rome.
- Neria Dorothea, probably a freedwoman, buried at Rome.
- Marcus Nerius M. l. Stephanus, named in an inscription from Rome.
- Nerius Aprio, probably a freedman, was the husband of Neria Pallas, and father of Neria.
- Neria Pallas, probably a freedwoman, was the wife of Nerius Aprio, and mother of Neria.
- Neria, the daughter of Nerius Aprio and Neria Pallas, buried at Rome, aged six years, two months.
- Nerius Fortunatus, erected a monument to his wife at Carthage.
- Gaius Nerius C. f. Severus, aedile, quaestor, and flamen, according to a monument erected by his brother, Gaius Nerius Justus, at Peltuinum in Samnium.
- Gaius Nerius C. f. Justus, erected a monument to his brother, Gaius Nerius Severus.
- Sextus Nerius Sex. l. Musa, buried at Brixellum.
- Quintus Nerius C. f., mentioned in an inscription from Clusium.
- Aulus Nerius, buried at Cirta in Numidia, aged eighty-one.

== See also ==
- List of Roman gentes

== Bibliography ==
- Marcus Tullius Cicero, Epistulae ad Quintum Fratrem, Pro Sestio.
- Joseph Hilarius Eckhel, Doctrina Numorum Veterum (The Study of Ancient Coins, 1792–1798).
- Dictionary of Greek and Roman Biography and Mythology, William Smith, ed., Little, Brown and Company, Boston (1849).
- Theodor Mommsen et alii, Corpus Inscriptionum Latinarum (The Body of Latin Inscriptions, abbreviated CIL), Berlin-Brandenburgische Akademie der Wissenschaften (1853–present).
- Ernest Babelon, Monnaies de la Republique Romaine (Coinage of the Roman Republic). 2 Vols. Paris, 1885.
- René Cagnat et alii, L'Année épigraphique (The Year in Epigraphy, abbreviated AE), Presses Universitaires de France (1888–present).
- George Davis Chase, "The Origin of Roman Praenomina", in Harvard Studies in Classical Philology, vol. VIII (1897).
- Stéphane Gsell, Inscriptions Latines de L'Algérie (Latin Inscriptions from Algeria, abbreviated ILAlg), Edouard Champion, Paris (1922–present).
- T. Robert S. Broughton, The Magistrates of the Roman Republic, American Philological Association (1952).
- Michael Crawford, Roman Republican Coinage, Cambridge University Press (1974, 2001).
