= Dian Cecht =

Irish mythological god of healing

Dian Cécht God of healing
- Member of the Tuatha Dé Danann

Genealogy
- Parents: Esarg or the Dagda
- Children: Cu, Cethen, Cian, Miach, Airmed, Étaín, Ochtriullach

In Irish mythology, Dian Cécht (Old Irish pronunciation: [d̠ʲiːa̯n ˈkʲeːxt̪]; also known as Cainte or Canta) was the god of healing, the healer for the Tuatha Dé Danann, and son of the Dagda according to the Dindsenchas.

He was the father of Cu, Cethen and Cian. His other children were Miach, Airmed, Étaín the poet and Ochtriullach (Octriuil). Through Cian, he is also Lugh's paternal grandfather.

== Etymology ==
The name Dian Cecht may be a combination of the Old Irish common words dían 'swift' and cécht, glossed as 'power', hence the literal meaning may be literally "swift power". (Note: See "2 cécht", eDIL, usage includes the instance from Cóir Anmann, so Cormac's Glossary is not the sole attestation as Williams (2018), pp. 113–114 note 126 suggests.) The Cóir Anmann refers to him as the "god of power", with cécht glossed as "power" (Old Irish: cumachtae).

In Old Irish, there is also the word cécht meaning 'plough-beam' (or less accurately 'ploughshare'), but this makes "little sense in the light of his activities", and this lexical meaning is "presumably not relevant".

Linguistic knowledge about regular sound changes in Celtic languages (McCone, 1996) and analysis of the University of Wales’ Proto-Celtic lexicon and of Julius Pokorny’s Indogermanisches etymologisches Wörterbuch permit *Deino-kwekwto- ‘swift concoction’ as a plausible Proto-Celtic reconstruction for this theonym, hence the original name of the deity may have signified 'swift potion' or, by extrapolation even 'He-who-is-Swift-with-Healing-Remedies'. However this suggestion is problematic since the root is not attested in Old Irish, but only in the Brythonic cousin languages.

== Genealogy ==
Dian Cécht is described as a son of the Dagda in the Dindsenchas. His children varied according to source.

Dian Cécht had fours sons, Cu, Cethen, Cian (the father of Lugh), and Miach according to a tract in the Book of Invasions (Lebor Gabála Érenn), although the same tract states that the fourth son, Miach the physician, was often not reckoned. Cu, Cethen and Cian were called the "three sons of Cainté" in the late modern narrative Aided Chlainne Tuirenn. Dian Cécht was grandfather to Lugh, since Cían son of Dían Cécht is the father of Lugh, by Ethne daughter of Balor.

Dian Cécht had yet another son, Octriuil, who was also a physician: Dían Cécht's two sons Octriuil (Irish: Ochttríuil) and Míach, and his daughter Airmed chanted over the healing well named Sláine (cf. § Curative well below).

Dian Cécht's daughters were Airmed the she-leech (female physician) and Étan the poet according to the aforementioned Book of Invasions tract.

== Curative well ==
Dian Cécht ministered to the injured by soaking them in "Slainge's Well" (Old Irish: Tiprait Slainge) (Note: Also given as "the spring of Slange" in the metrical version.) or rather the "well of healing" (Tipra Sláíne) (Note: Translated as "a well named Slaíne" by Gray or "well named Slane" by Stokes in the Cath Maige Tuired, but Gray appends "Tipra Sláíne" in glossary.) when the Second Battle of Magh Tuireadh (Cath Maige Tuired) was fought.

The well was located at Achad Abla ('Field of the Apple Tree'), northwest of Magh Tuireadh (Moytura). He also ground medicinal herbs nearby on Lusmag "Herb-plain", or else, he chanted spells over the well together with his two sons Miach and Octriuil and daughter Airmed.

Dian Cécht, when questioned on his ability, boasted to be able mend anyone but those who have been decapitated (or whose brain or spinal cord have been severely damaged); this he presumably accomplished using the Tipra Sláíne. (Note: Mackillop (2006) glosses this as "spring of life". See also § Genealogy.)

== Boiling of the River Barrow ==
It was Dian Cecht who once saved Ireland, and was indirectly the cause of the name of the River Barrow. The Morrígú, the Dagda's fierce wife, had borne a son of such terrible aspect that the physician of the gods, foreseeing danger, counselled that he should be destroyed in his infancy.

When this was done, Dian Cecht opened the infant's heart, and found within it three serpents, capable, when they grew to full size, of depopulating Ireland. He lost no time in destroying these serpents also, and burning them into ashes, to avoid the evil which even their dead bodies might do. More than this, he flung the ashes into the nearest river, for he feared that there might be danger even in them. So venomous were they that the river boiled up and slew every living creature in it, and therefore it has been called the River Barrow, the ‘Boiling’ ever since.

According to the Metrical Dindsenchas:

No motion it made
The ashes of Meichi the strongly smitten:
The stream made sodden and silent past recovery
The fell filth of the old serpent.

Three turns the serpent made;
It sought the soldier to consume him;
It would have wasted by its doing the kine;
The fell filth of the old serpent.

Therefore Diancecht slew it;
There rude reason for clean destroying it,
For preventing it from wasting
Worse than any wolf pack, from consuming utterly.

Known to me is the grave where he cast it,
A tomb without walls or roof-tree;
Its ashes, evil without loveliness or innocence
Found silent burial in noble Barrow.

This tale in the Dindsenchas indicates that the being slain by Diancecht was a serpent named Meichi. Elsewhere the figure named as the slayer of Meichi is Mac Cecht.

== Dian Cecht’s Envy ==
Dian Cecht made King Nuada a silver arm which could move and function as a normal arm. Later his son, Miach, replaced the silver arm with an arm of flesh and blood, and Dian Cecht killed him out of professional envy.

Miach's sister, Airmed, mourned over her brother's grave. As her tears fell, all the healing herbs of the world grew from the grave. Airmed arranged and catalogued the herbs, but then Dian Cécht again reacted with anger and jealousy and scattered the herbs, destroying his daughter's work as well as his son's. For this reason, it is said that no human now knows the healing properties of all the herbs.

== Additional appearances ==
In Tochmarc Étaíne, Dian Cecht healed Mider after the latter lost an eye when struck with a twig of hazel.

In the St. Gall incantations, there is a spell that mentions Dian Cécht:

I save the dead-alive. Against eructation, against spear-thong (amentum), against sudden tumour, against bleeding caused by iron, against... which fire burns, against.... which a dog eats, ...that withers: three nuts that... three sinews that weave (?). I strike its disease, I vanquish blood...: let it not be a chronic tumour. Whole be that whereon it (Diancecht's salve) goes. I put my trust in the salve which Diancecht left with his family that whole may be that whereon it goes.

This is laid always in thy palm full of water when washing, and thou puttest it into thy mouth, and thou insertest the two fingers that are next the little-finger into thy mouth, each of them apart.

Dian Cécht's harper and poet was named Corand. According to the Dindsenchas, Corand is implied to be the son of Dian Cecht and summoned a swine called Caelcheis from the Dagda's harp, which the champions of Connacht chased to Magh Coraind.

An early Irish legal text on the law of illegal injury, Bretha Déin Chécht ("Judgements of Dian Cécht"), is attributed to Dian Cécht. A late-historical preface to the Senchas Már details the codification and Christianization of Irish law by Saint Patrick and his commissioners. Dian Cecht is explicitly listed as among the pre-Christian authors whose judgements were accepted because they did not contradict Christian teaching.

== See also ==
- Borvo
- Healing
- List of health deities
