= Februus =

Roman god of purification

- God of purification and the Underworld
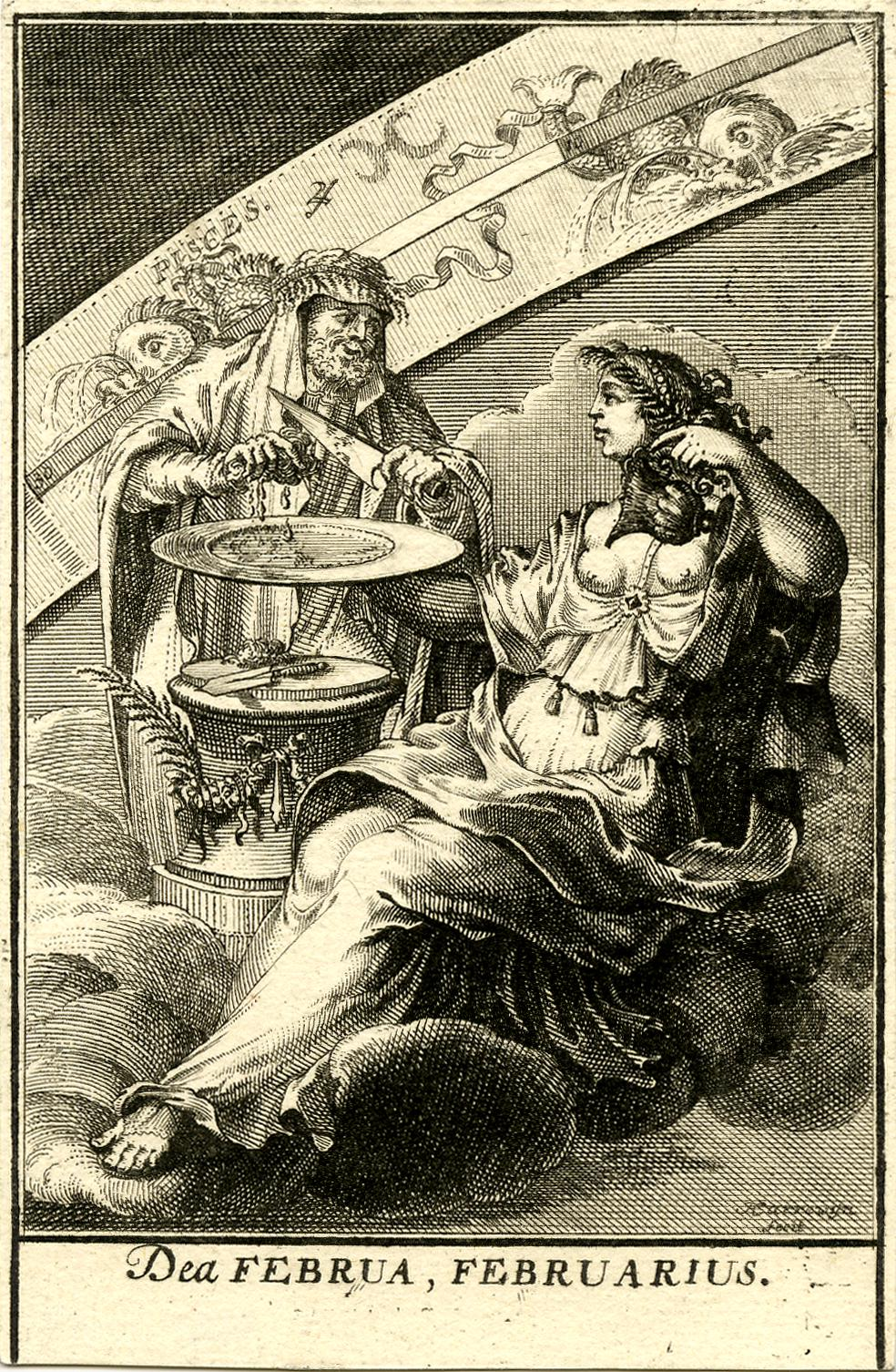
- Februus and Febris, representing the month of February
- Major cult center: Ancient Italy
- Successor: Febris (assumed)
- Gender: Male
- Ethnic group: Etruscans and Romans
- Festivals: Februalia

Equivalents
- Greek: Hades/Pluto

Februus is an ancient Italic god of purifications, who was worshipped by both the Romans and Etruscans. He was also worshipped as the god of the underworld by the Etruscans. For them, Februus was also the god of riches (money and gold) and death, both connected loosely to the underworld in the same natural manner as with the better-known Roman god Pluto. Februus' name could mean "the underground [one]" in the Etruscan language.

Februus may have become the Roman Febris, goddess of fever (febris in Latin means fever). These are possibly connected with the sweating of fevers, which was considered a purgative, washing, and purification process.

Februus is possibly named in honor of the more ancient Februa, also Februalia, festival of washing and purification. Februus' holy month was Februarius (of Februa), hence the English ′′February′′, a month named for the Februa/Februalia purification festival which occurred on the 15th of that month. These purification activities occurred at about the same time as Lupercalia, a Roman festival in honor of Faunus and also the wolf who nursed Romulus and Remus, during which expiatory sacrifices and ritual purifications were also performed. Because of this coincidence, the two gods Faunus and Februus were often considered the same entity.

== See also ==
- Deities and personifications of seasons
- List of death deities
