= Badi Mata =

Badi Mata/Chamariya Mata is a Hindu goddess of disease, one of a group of seven sister goddesses with similar associations. Chamariya Mata/Badi Mata is doubtless allied to Chamars. Badi Mata is worshipped by some tribes in India, such as the Saharia, Chamar and the Kamar. Her worshippers believe that her wrath causes people to suffer from smallpox. The worshippers sacrifice goats to appease her.

Badi Mata's sisters were Sitala Mata, Phul Mata, Pansahi Mata, Gusulia Mata, Kankar Mata, and Malbal. She was also associated with Choti Mata, who is associated with chicken pox, and Sendri Mata who is associated with measles.
