= Phul Mata =

Hindu deity

Phul Mata is a Hindu goddess of disease, one of a group of seven sister goddesses with similar associations. Her sisters were Sitala Mata, Badi Mata, Pansahi Mata, Gusulia Mata, Kankar Mata, and Malbal. Another tradition names the sisters as Sitala Mata, Chamariya mata, Durga Kali, Maha Kali, Bhadra kali and Kalika Bhavani. As a group, they were well known in northern India, and were often represented by balls of clay. Phul Mata was specifically associated with typhoid fever.

Phul Mata is mentioned in epic and Puranic Hindu literature. She may have originally been perceived as a shakti, a personification of divine power, but in Hinduism gradually became associated with evil intent and illness. She was said to inflict sickness on children under seven years of age.
