= Shitala Ashtami =

Hindu festival honoring the goddess Sheetala

Sheetala Ashtami
- Observed by: Hindus
- Type: Hindu
- Celebrations: Worshipping
- Date: Chaitra māsa Ashtami tithi
- Frequency: Annual

Sheetala Ashtami or Sheetalasthami is a Hindu festival in honor of the goddess Shitala or Sheetala, celebrated on the eighth day (ashtami) or the third quarter of the Lunar Cycle in the month of Chaitra after the festival of colors, Holi.

Sheetala Ashtami is celebrated on the eighth day of Krishna Paksha (the waning moon) in the Hindu month of Chaitra, and thus falls eight days after Holi.

The festival falls at the start of the summer season; Shitala is worshipped to ward off heat-borne diseases, such as smallpox, and also to bring prosperity. Observances of the day involve offering to the goddess and consuming only food prepared one or two days before. For this reason, Sheetala Ashtami is referred to in some parts of India as Basora or Basoda, meaning "previous night". Khadi, panchkuta, khichiya, and sweetened rice are foods traditionally offered and consumed. After this day, stale food is not to be eaten.
