= Eeyeekalduk =

Inuit deity

In Inuit mythology, Eeyeekalduk was the god of medicine and good health.
