= Averruncus =

Roman god of averting harm

In ancient Roman religion, Averruncus or Auruncus is a god of averting harm. Aulus Gellius says that he is one of the potentially malignant deities who must be propitiated for their power to both inflict and withhold disaster from people and the harvests.

Although the etymology of the name is often connected to the Latin verb āvertō, "to turn away," a more probable origin lies in āverruncō, "to ward off," perhaps with a reference to magical sweeping. Varro asserts that the infinitive verb āverruncāre shares its etymology with the god whose primary function is averting. Averruncus may be among the indigitamenta pertaining to another god such as Apollo or Mars, that is, it may be a name to be used in a prayer formulary to fix the local action of the invoked deity. Precise naming, in connection with concealing a deity's true name to monopolize its power, was a crucial part of prayer in antiquity, as evidenced not only in the traditional religions of Greece and Rome and syncretistic Hellenistic religion and mystery cult, but also in Judaism and ancient Egyptian religion.

Averruncus may have also been an aspect of Jupiter or another deity invoked specifically in a protective manner.
