= Ashtami =

Eighth day of the lunar fortnight in the Hindu calendar

Ashtami (अष्टमी aṣṭamī) is the eighth day (Tithi) of Hindu lunar calendar.

== Festivals ==
=== Krishna Janmashtami ===
Krishna Janmashtami or Gokul Ashtami is a Hindu festival celebrating the birth of Lord Krishna, an avatar of Hindu deity Vishnu.

Krishna Janmashtami is observed on the Ashtami tithi, the eighth day of the dark half or Krishna Paksha of the month of Bhaadra in the Hindu calendar, when the Rohini Nakshatra is ascendant. Rasa lila or dramatic enactments of the life of Krishna are a special feature in regions of Mathura, and Vrindavan, Nalbari and regions following Vaishnavism in Manipur.

=== Radhashtami ===
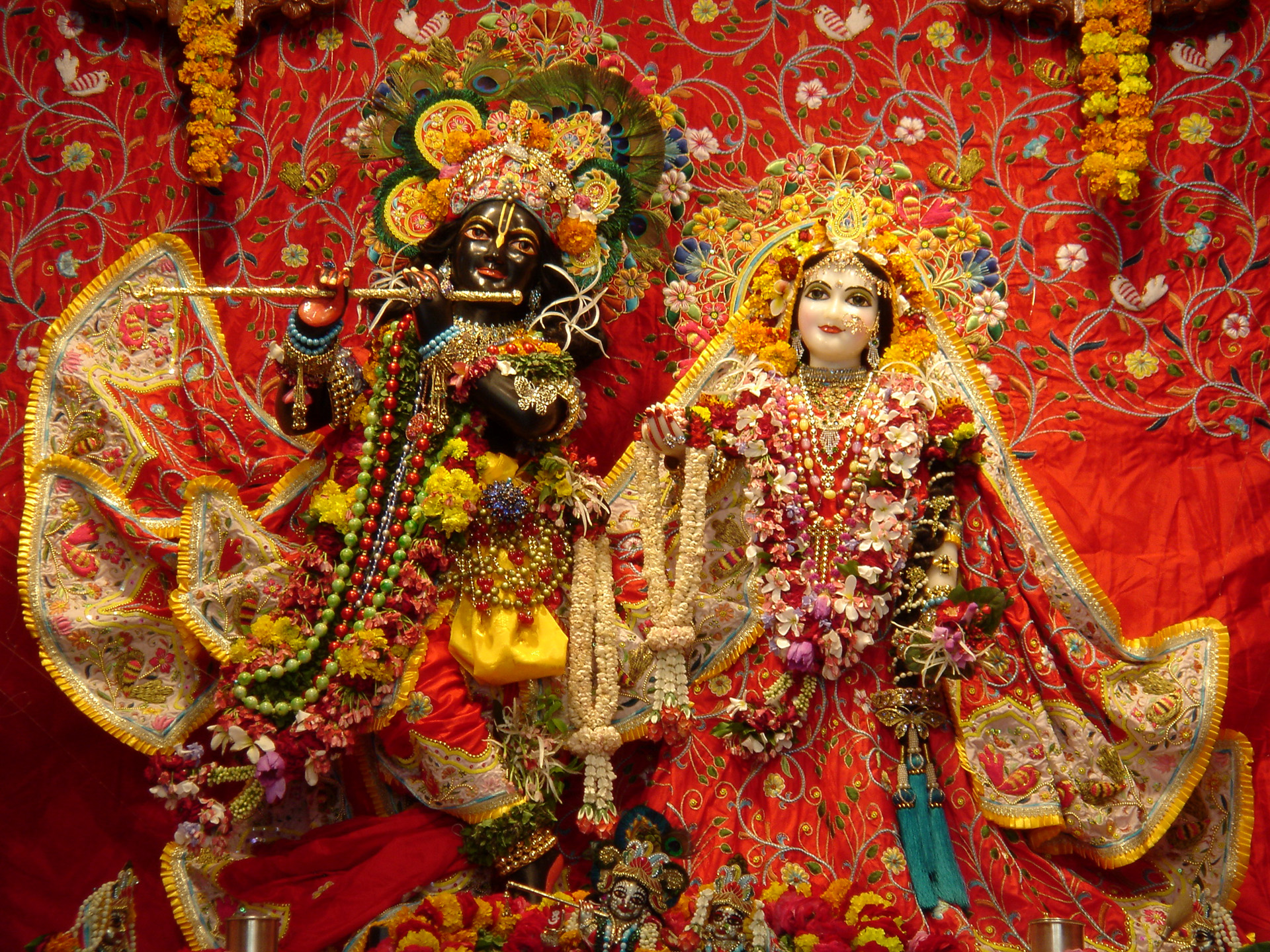
Radha Krishna on Radhashtami

Radhashtami or Radha Jayanti is the Hindu festival celebrating the appearance day of Goddess Radha, avatar of Lakshmi. The festival is celebrated annually on the eighth day of Bhadra month of bright moon. On this day, devotees keep fast, sing glories, dance and enact the divine pastimes of Goddess Radha.

=== Trilochan Ashtami ===
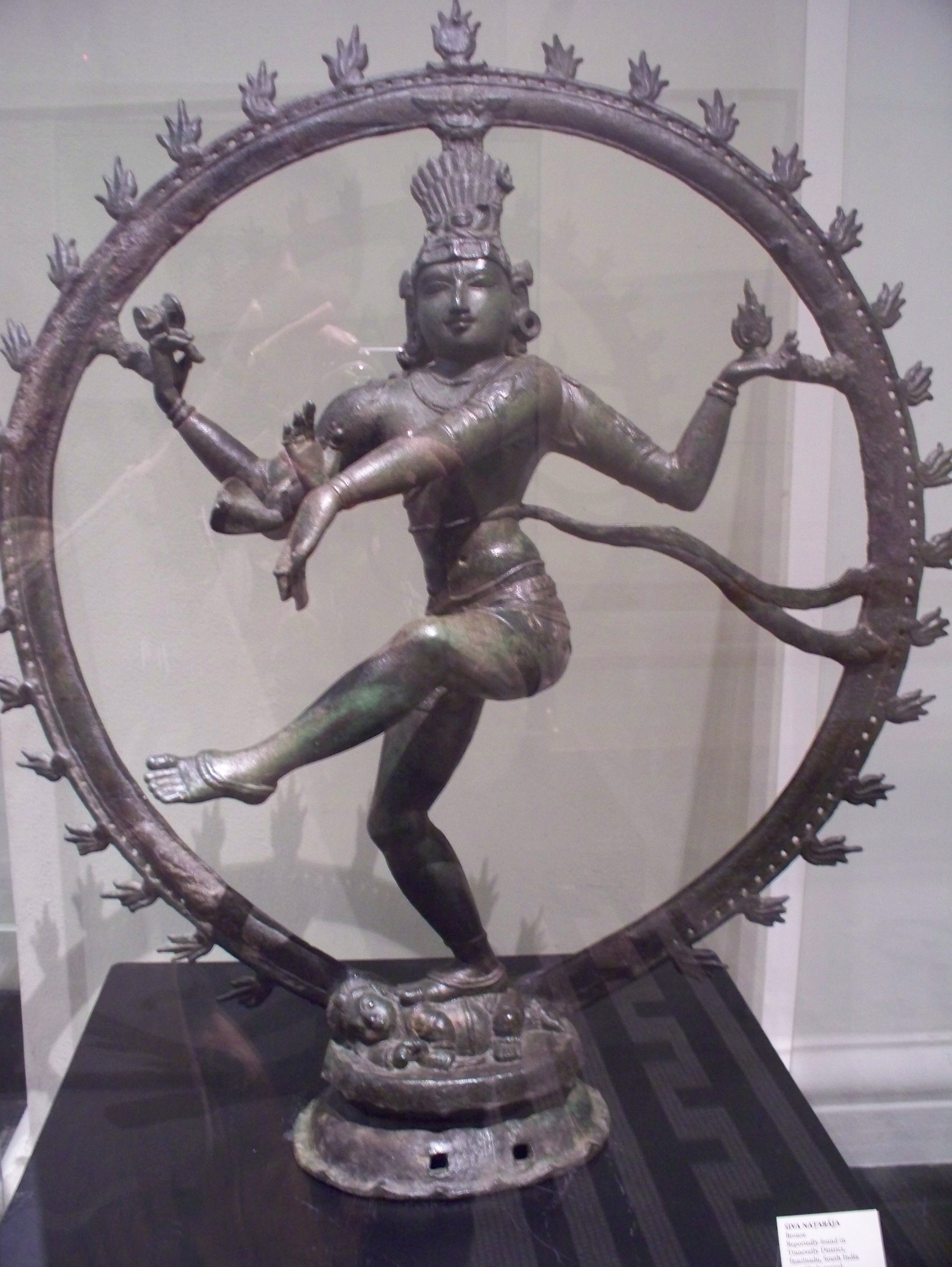
Three-eyed, Trilochana (त्रिलोचन) Nataraj Image of Shiva

Trilochana Ashtami or Trilochanashtami (त्रिलोचन अष्टमी), is a Hindu auspicious day dedicated to Lord Shiva and Goddess Parvati celebrated in Odisha and different parts of India.

Tri(त्रि) means Three and lochan(लोचन) means Eye. Hence one who having three eyes is called as Trilochan (त्रिलोचन) literally means to Shiva, three-eyed, that is, indication of the present, past and future.

=== Bhairava Ashtami ===
Bhairava Ashtami or Kalabhairava Ashtami commemorating the day Kal Bhairav, a fierce manifestation of Shiva, appeared on earth, is celebrated on Krishna paksha Ashtami of the Margashirsha month with a day special prayers and rituals.

=== Sheetala Ashtami ===
Sheetala Ashtami is dedicated to the goddess Shitala or Sheetala.
