= Airmed =

Goddess in Irish mythology

- Herbalism
- Member of Tuatha Dé Danann
- Other names: Airmid, Airmedh
- Region: Ireland

Genealogy
- Parents: Dian Cecht
- Siblings: Miach

In Irish mythology, the goddess Airmed (also given as Airmid) was one of the Tuatha Dé Danann. With her father Dian Cecht and brother Miach, she healed those injured in the Second Battle of Magh Tuiredh.

After their Dian Cecht replaced the king Nuada Airgetlám's missing hand with a silver prosthesis, Airmed and her brother Miach made flesh glow over the silver, making it as if Nuada had never lost use of his hand at all and allowing him to continue his rule. Dian Cecht was furious at being upstaged, and killed Miach as revenge.

After her jealous father slew her brother, Miach, Airmed wept over her brother's grave. Watered by her tears, all the healing herbs of the world (365 in number - according to the number of Miach's joints and veins) sprung from the earth over Miach's body, and Airmed collected and organized them all, spreading them on her cloak. As she was categorizing them, her father snuck up behind her and, after waiting for her to finish, scattered the herbs. For this reason, no living human knows all the secrets of herbalism. Only Airmed remembers. The ancient Irish believed that this loss of knowledge greatly increased humanity's suffering.

Along with Dian Cecht, Ochtriullach, and Miach, Airmed was one of the enchanters whose incantation sung over the well of Sláine and was able to resurrect the dead.

Airmed has multiple siblings: A sister named Etan, and six brothers, Cethan, Cian, Cu, Miach, Ochtriuil, and Ormiach.
