= Temple of Pudicitia Patricia =

Ancient Roman shrine

The Temple of Pudicitia Patricia (patrician chastity) was a small shrine in ancient Rome, located in the Forum Boarium. It was described as being next to the Temple of Hercules Victor.

According to Livy (10.23.3-5), it was in conflict with the Temple of Pudicitia Plebea on the Quirinal Hill and contained a statue and an altar. However, some argue that Livy created the temple or confused it with the Temple of Fortuna in order to provide a patrician counterpoint to the Temple of Pudicitia Plebea, whose founder Virginia was banished from the Temple of Pudicitia Patricia for her second marriage to the future consul Lucius Volumnius, since only women who had only married once were allowed inside. It is also mentioned by Festus (282L).

== See also ==
- List of Ancient Roman temples
