= Jvarasura =

Hindu personification of fever

Jvara
- Personification of Fever
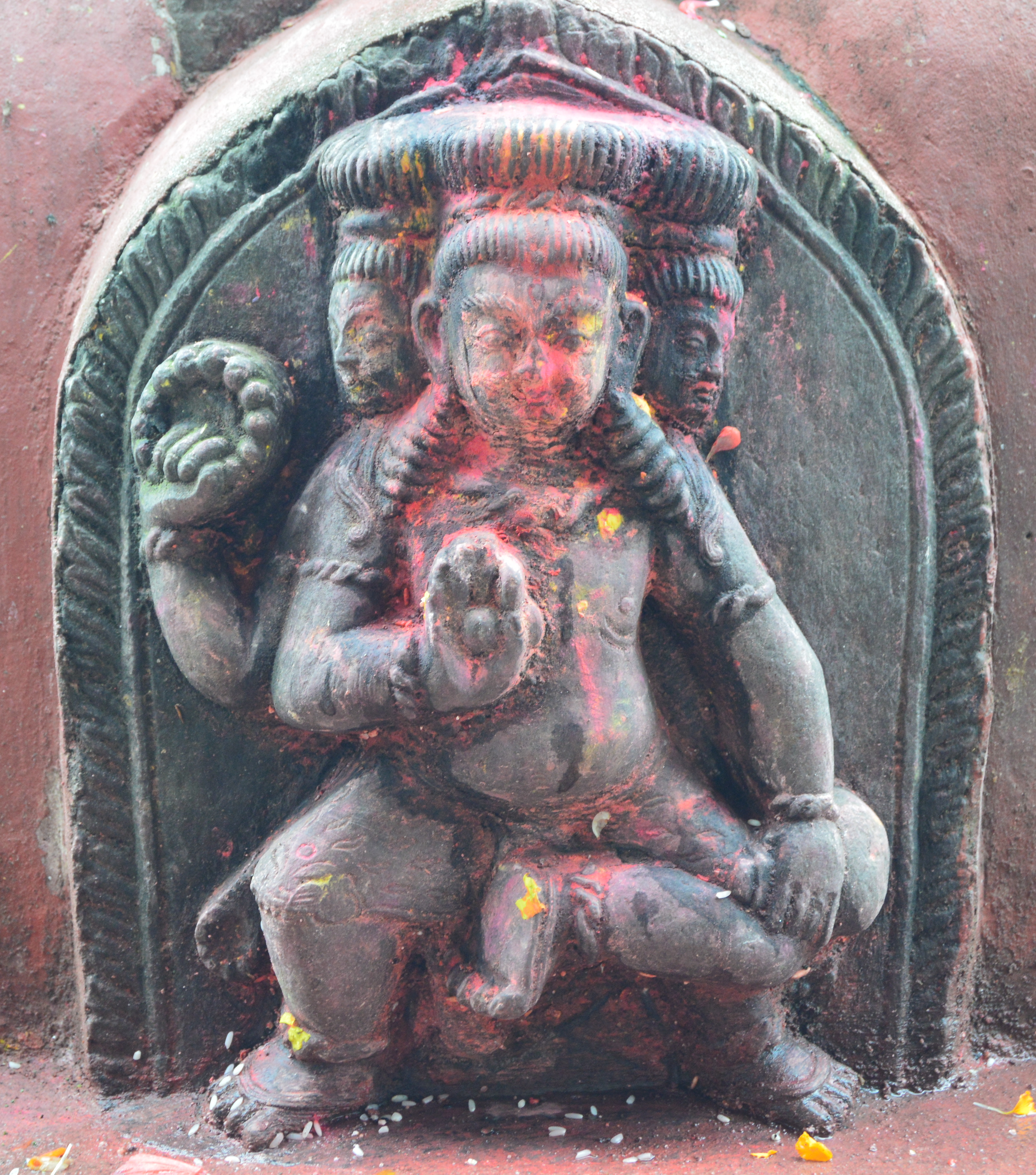
- Jwarhareshwor Statue at Gokarneshwor Mahadev Temple premises in Kathmandu
- Devanagari: ज्वारासुर
- Bengali: জ্বরাসুর
- Affiliation: Asura

Equivalents
- Roman: Febris

Jvara (Sanskrit: ज्वर, romanized: Jvara, lit. 'fever'), also called Jvarasura, is the personification of fever in Hindu tradition. He is the servant, and sometimes the attendant, of the pox-goddess, Shitala.

The cult of Shitala-Jvarasura is popular in rural Bengal and North India, prayed to for protection against pox and fever.

== Nomenclature ==
Jvarasura is a compound of two Sanskrit terms: jvara (meaning 'fever') and asura (a class of beings, often translated as 'demon'). Thus, the name translates to "the demon of fever". Forms of the word jvara mean fever in several modern Indian languages, including Bengali, Odia, Kannada, and Hindi.

== Hinduism ==
When Shiva was not invited to Daksha's yajna, his wife, Sati, was swept by sorrow. Observing the unease of his wife, Shiva's third eye issued a drop of sweat, and a fearful creature emerged out of the sweat, gleaming like a flame. The creature was dwarfish, with penetrating eyes, donning a green moustache, with hair standing erect on his head and body, looking like hybrid of a hawk and an owl, jet-black in hue, and was dressed in a blood-coloured cloth. He named the creature Jvara, and the creature proceeded to cause a fever to all the devas.

Once, Vishnu was inflicted with the fever of Jvarasura, while in his avatar of Hayagriva. He then killed the fever-demon by cutting him into three pieces using his discus, the Sudarshana Chakra. However, Jvarasura was later revived by Brahma, who joined the three parts. But, by that time, each three parts had grown a head and a limb. Thus, Jvarasura is depicted as having three faces, three feet, and a remarkable ability to move in all directions at once. He was later selected as the servant of the pox-goddess, Shitala.

== Buddhism ==
In Buddhist tradition, Jvarasura is depicted sometimes as consort of Paranashavari, the Buddhist goddess of diseases. In some images, these deities are shown as flying away with Shitala, to escape from wrath of Parnashvari.

== See also ==
- Febris; goddess of fever in Roman mythology
