= Miach =

Character in Irish mythology

In Irish mythology, Miach (Irish pronunciation: [ˈmʲiəx]) was a son of Dian Cecht of the Tuatha Dé Danann. He replaced the silver arm his father made for Nuada with an arm of flesh and blood; Dian Cecht killed him out of jealousy for being able to do so when he himself could not. Dian Cecht killed him by chopping Miach's head four times with his sword. The first strike only cut Miach's skin and Miach healed it. The second blow broke Miach's skull but Miach also healed that. The third cut grazed Miach's brain yet Miach could even heal this. Dian Cecht's fourth attack cut his son's brain in half and finally killed Miach. This resulted in 365 herbs growing from his grave, which his sister Airmid arranged, but which their father scattered. In any case, however, Miach is later seen in the story continuing to heal the Tuatha Dé by his father's and sister's side, so apparently there were no hard feelings.

In The Fate of the Children of Tuireann Miach makes an appearance with his brother Oirmiach at the beginning of the story. In the story, they replace the missing eye of Nuada's doorkeeper with the eye of a cat. Then they draw a devil out of Nuada's blackened arm and kill it. Finally, they find a replacement arm for Nuada, and Oirmiach sets the arm while Miach retrieves herbs to complete the healing.

== Etymology ==
Miach is often translated as 'bushel', but has a meaning of an agreed upon amount of grain; Irish law texts also use miach in reference to an amount of malted grain, and in Munster there is reference to a fleith in méich or 'Feast of Miach'.

== Significance ==
Grandsons of the Dagda, Miach and his brother Oirmiach are hypothesized to be the vestiges of the Celtic Divine Twins. The alliterative names are a hallmark of twinning, indicating that the two brothers were in origin twins. They are the physicians of the Tuatha De Danann and upon arriving at Nuadu's court are described as "handsome, young, and of good stature;" beauty is one of the signatures of twin gods of the third function. When Miach (or in alternative accounts both Miach and Oirmiach) is killed by his father Dian Cecht, 365 herbs grow from his grave - the same number of days in a solar year, which may signify totality. Finally, Miach's healing of Nuadu's arm takes thrice nine days or 27 days total - the same as a lunar month.
