= Parnashavari =

Buddhist goddess of disease

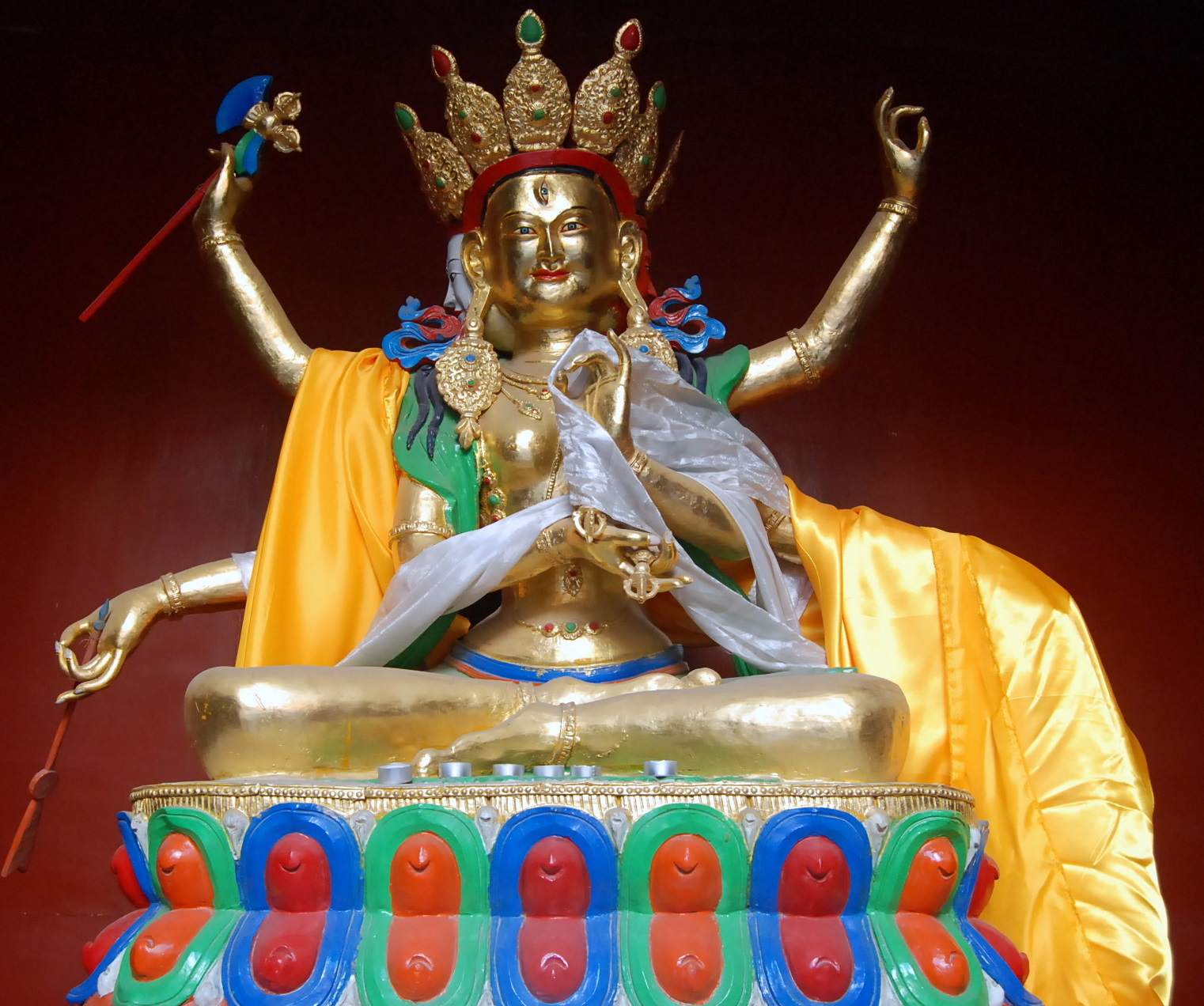
Statue of Parnashavari

Parnashavari (IAST: Parṇaśabarī, Tibetan: Lomagyuma Sanskrit: पर्णशबरी), also spelt as Paranasavari or Parnasabari, is a Hindu-Buddhist deity of diseases, the worship of whom is believed to offer effective protection against out-breaks of epidemics.

Parnashavari is also depicted in some images of the Pala period found in Dhaka, as a main goddess and escorted by the Hindu deities Jvarasura and Shitala. Both of these escorts are disease related Hindu deities. In India, the Kurkihar hoard contains seven bronze images of Parnashavari belonging to 10th–12th century AD.

In Buddhism, Parnashavari is depicted as an attendant of the mother goddess Tara. Some say that the term Parnashavari is an attempt to connect the deity with Vindya region, as Sabaras held a stronghold over the region.
