= Vicus Longus =

Former street in ancient Rome

The vicus Longus was a street in Regio VI of ancient Rome, linking the Suburra to the summit of the Quirinal Hill along the valley between the Quirinal Hill and the Viminal Hill.

Livy (X.23.6.) mentions it in relation to the dedication of an altar to Pudicitia Plebeia in 296 BC - he reports that there were shrines on it to Febris and Fortuna. Its name is confirmed by two imperial-era inscriptions (CIL VI, 9736, CIL VI 10023). A long stretch of the street's end was destroyed to build the Baths of Diocletian.

== Bibliography ==
- L Richardson Junior, A New Topographical Dictionary of Ancient Rome, p 425
