= Temple of Pudicitia Plebeia =

Ancient Roman temple

The Temple of Pudicitia Plebeia was an ancient Roman temple on the Quirinal Hill, along the Vicus Longus, on what is now via Nazionale. It was dedicated to 'plebeian chastity' and built in 296 BC by Virginia, wife of the future consul Lucius Volumnius, in a section of her own house.

According to Livy, (10.23.6-10), it was built in opposition to a shrine or temple to Pudicitia Patricia (whose existence is not definite and may be a conflation with the Temple of Fortuna) after the patrician-born Virginia was excluded from the latter after her marriage to a plebeian. Livy states that the cult declined and was forgotten due to women's extreme openness and opposition to the concept of chastity, though Festus in the 2nd century AD stated that its cult was still active.

== See also ==
- List of Ancient Roman temples

== Bibliography ==
- Filippo Coarelli, Guida archeologica di Roma, Verona, Arnoldo Mondadori Editore, 1984
- Lawrence Richardson, Jr., A New Topographical Dictionary of Ancient Rome, JHU Press.
