= Shitala =

Hindu goddess

- Ailments
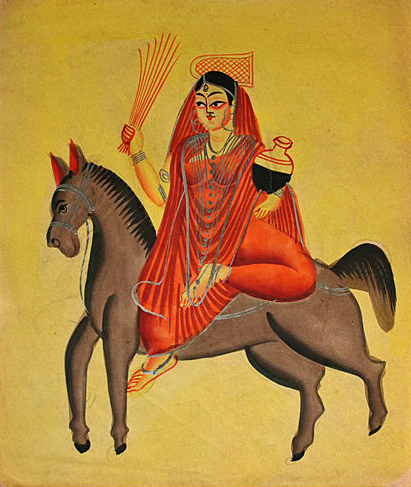
- Shitala on Jvarasura
- Affiliation: Devi; Parvati
- Weapon: Broom, hand fan, water pot (medicinal water for cure for diseases)
- Mount: Jvarasura (donkey)
- Festivals: Shitala Ashtami
- Consort: Shiva

Shitala (Sanskrit: शीतला, IAST: śītalā, lit. 'coolness'; also spelled as Sheetala, Śītalā and Seetla) is a Hindu goddess venerated primarily in North India. She is regarded as an incarnation of Parvati and is believed to cure poxes, sores, ghouls, pustules, and diseases, and most directly linked with the disease smallpox. Shitala is worshipped on Tuesday, Saptami and Ashtami (the seventh and eighth day of a Hindu month), especially after Holi during the month of Chaitra. The celebration of Shitala on the seventh and eighth day of the Hindu month is referred to as the Shitala Saptami and Shitala Ashtami, respectively.

== Name and variants ==
She is mentioned in Tantric and Puranic literature, and her later appearance in vernacular texts - such as the 17th-century Bengali-language Shitala Mangal-Kāvya (lit. 'auspicious poetry of Shitala') by Manikram Gangopadhyay - has contributed to popularising her worship.

In addition to being addressed as 'Mother', Shitala is also revered with honorific titles such as Thakurani, Jagrani (Queen of the World), Karunamayi (She Who Is Full of Mercy), Mangala (The Auspicious One), Bhagavati (The Revered Goddess), Dayamayi (She Who Is Compassionate, Full of Grace, and Kindness).

== Mythology ==
The deity is typically depicted as a mother who defends children from paediatric ailments, such as exanthemata and smallpox. She provides coolness to feverish patients and also serves as a fertility goddess that assists women in finding good husbands and conceiving healthy children. Her auspicious presence promises the welfare of the family and is considered to protect the devotee's sources of livelihood. Shitala is also summoned to ensure refreshing rainfall and the prevention of famines, droughts, and cattle diseases.

Some 16th-century copies of the Skanda Purana's Kāśī Khaṇḍa section on Varanasi describe Shitala curing ailments like smallpox pustules:

For the sake of quelling boils and blisters (of smallpox) and for the sake of the children, a devotee takes Masūra lentils by measures and grinds them. Due to the power of Śītalā, children become free from the disease.

— Skanda Purana, Chapter 12

The earliest Bengali language poems on Shitala were composed in Saptagram in 1690. 18th-century compositions from Midnapore, West Bengal led to Shitala's increasing prominence in religious worship. During this period, conflicts between the Maratha Empire and British East India Company led to famines that increased the mortality of smallpox cases.

Shitala is traditionally identified as an aspect of Parvati (or Durga), the divine consort of Shiva and is often seen as a form of Katyayani (the sixth form of Durga). According to the Devi Mahatmyam, when an asura named Jvarasura gave bacterial fever to all the children, Katyayani arrived in her avatar of Shitala to purify the children's blood by ridding them of the fever-causing bacteria, and vanquishing the evil Jvarasura. In Sanskrit jvara means 'fever', and shītala means 'coolness'. In Bengal, other deities often worshiped alongside Shitala include Ghentu-devata, the god of skin diseases; Raktavati, the goddess of blood infections and the sixty-four epidemics; and Oladevi, a cholera-associated disease goddess.

Shitala is sometimes also depicted as having six sisters, and at other times as the eldest of eight sisters, all of whom cause pustular diseases and are venerated for recovery. The sisters are: Masani, Basanti, Maha Mai, Polamde, Lamkaria, and Agwani. Another tradition names the sisters as Phulmati Mata, Chamariya Mata, Durga-Kali, Maha Kali, Bhadra Kali, and Kalika Bhavani. Shitala and her sisters are said reside in the trees of the neem (Azadirachta indica), kikar (Acacia arabica) or jand (Prosopis cineraria).

Shitala is historically understood as causing smallpox among non-believers, providing them an opportunity for reflection. Based on her religious role of healing those that make offerings to others recovering from illness, the World Health Organization's efforts to distribute smallpox vaccines initially faced resistance as local people saw vaccination as an attempt by Western science to circumvent Hindu religious order. To combat this perception, the international Smallpox Eradication Program (SEP) produced posters depicting Shitala with a vaccination needle to reinterpret immunization as derived from Shitala's power.

== Shitala Puja ==
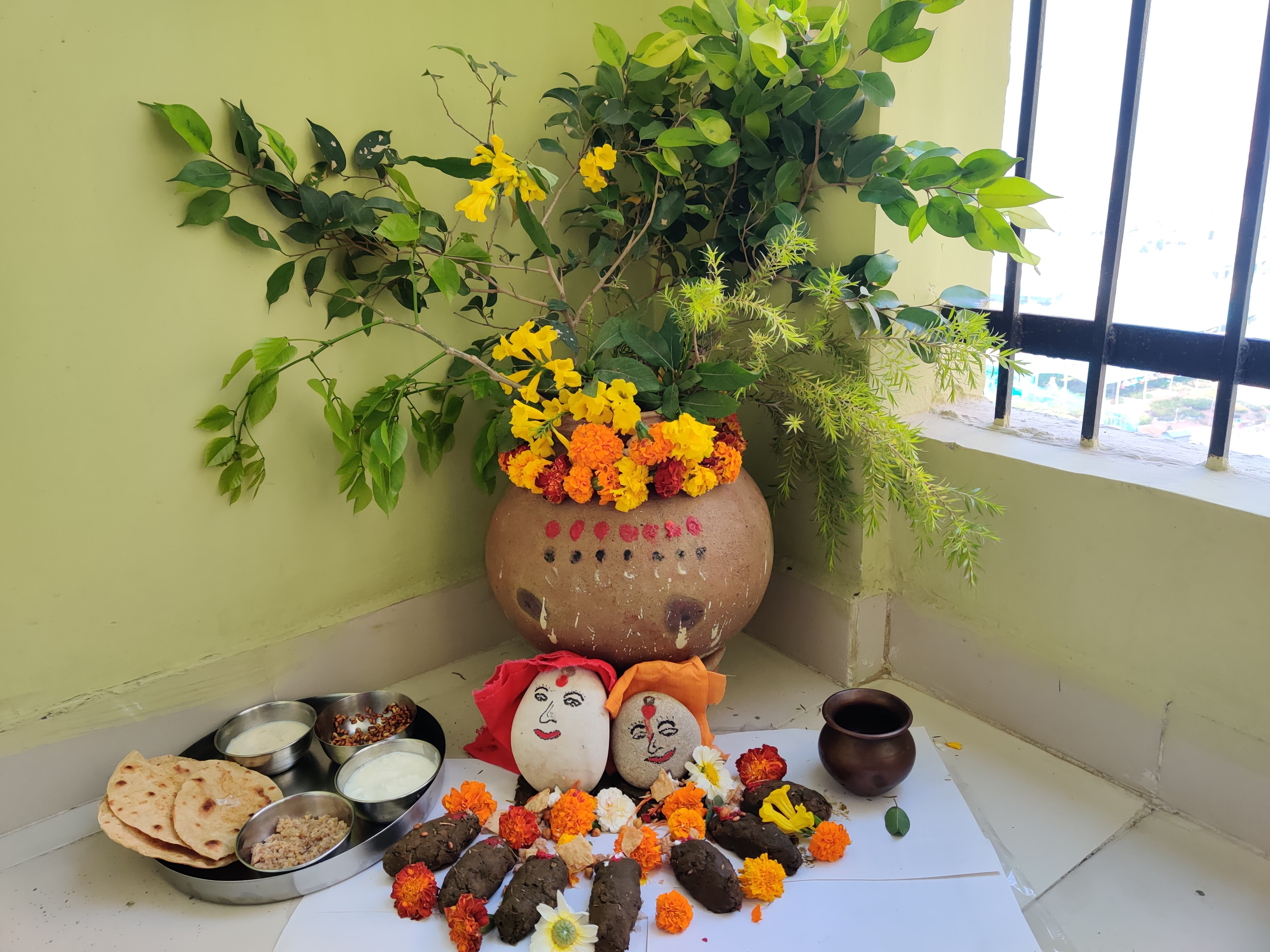
Shitala puja

Shitala may be worshiped at any time of the year. However, the annual period of worship is the month of Chaitra (March–April as per the Hindu calendar) on Shitala Ashtami as established by Raghunandana because the long, dry nights are associated with deaths from smallpox. Generally, she is worshiped early in the mornings of Monday, Tuesday and Wednesday. The month of Chaitra is important as it is the season in which wheat ripens. Also, the season is of Basant (spring). One of Shitala's name is Basanti and therefore, she represents the negative side of Basant and is therefore worshiped.

According to common belief, many families do not light their stoves on the Ashtami/Saptami day, and all devotees cheerfully eat cold food (cooked the previous night) in the form of prasada. The idea behind this is that as spring fades and summer approaches, cold food should be avoided.

== Iconography and symbolism ==
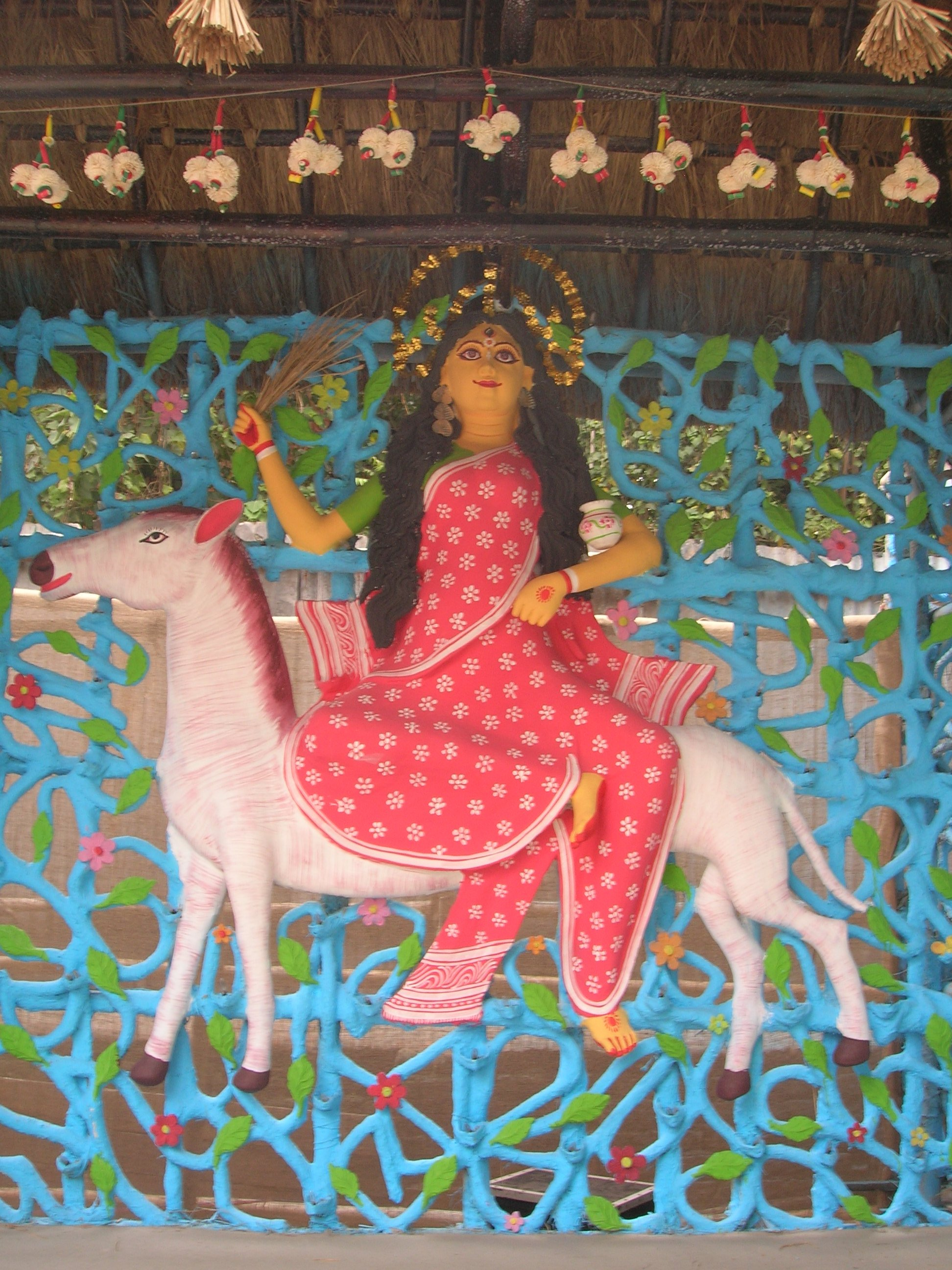
Image of Shitala

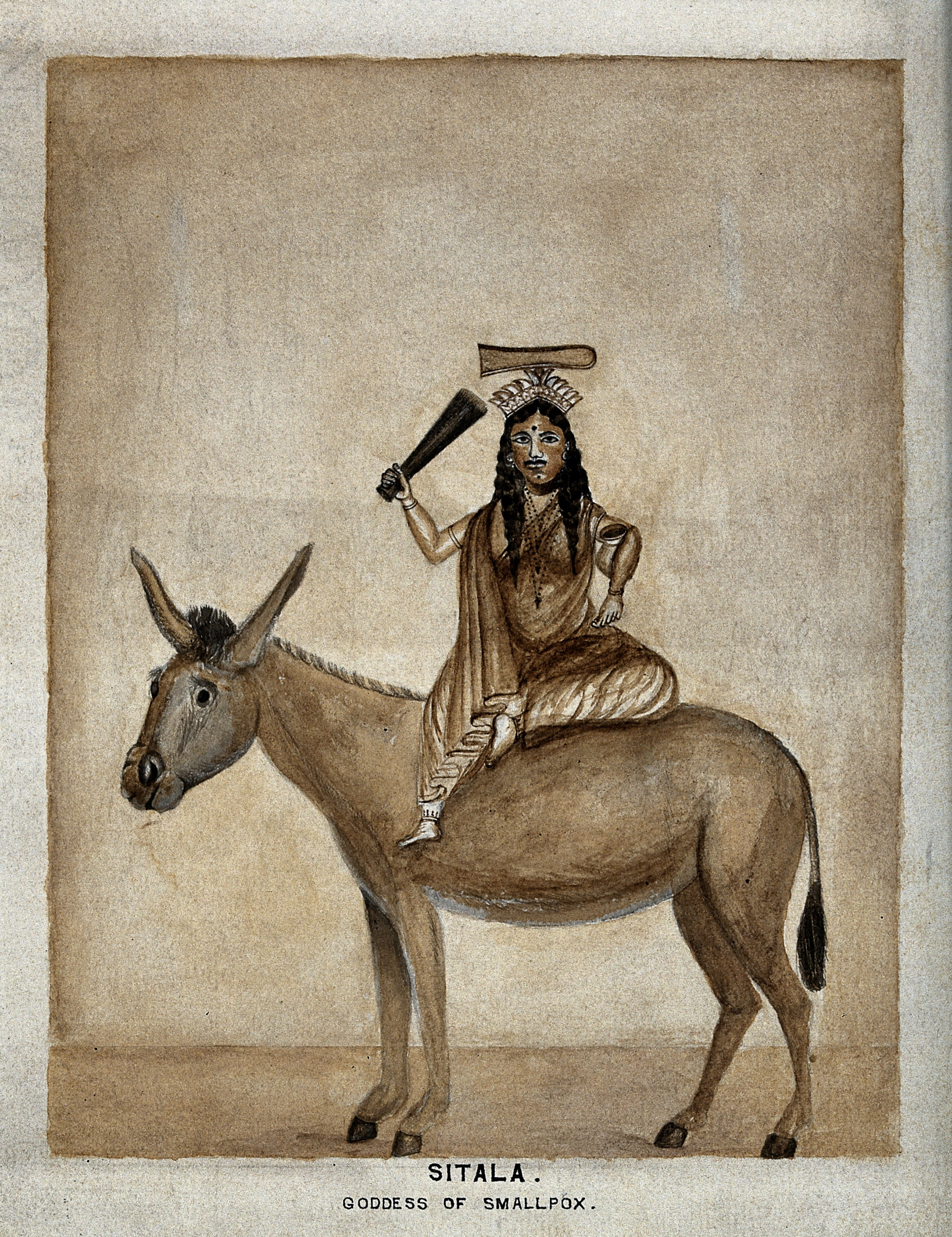
Shitala on a donkey

References to neem leaves are common in Shitala's liturgy and also appear in her iconography, suggesting an early understanding of neem as a medicinal plant. Moreover, neem leaves are extensively mentioned in the Sushruta Samhita, where it is listed as an effective antipyretic, as well as a remedy for certain inflammatory skin conditions.

== Buddhism ==
In Buddhist legends, Jvarasura and Shitala are depicted sometimes as companions of Paranasabari, the Buddhist goddess of diseases. Jvarasura and Shitala are shown escorting her to her right and left side, respectively.

== Temples and shrines in India ==
At the Sheetla Mata Mandir Gurgaon in Gurgaon, Haryana, she is worshipped as the Kripi (the wife of Drona).

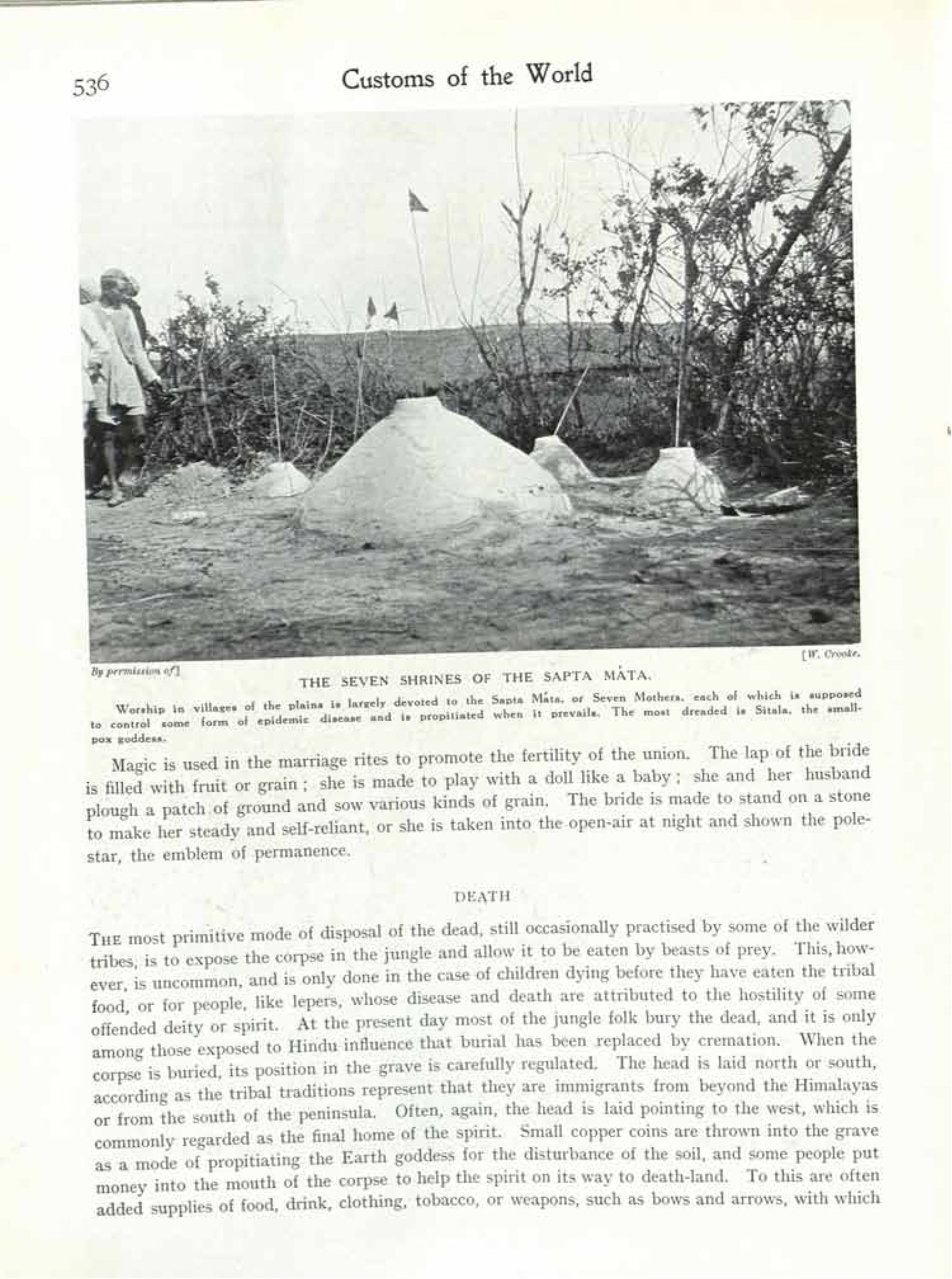
Photograph of the seven shrines of the Sapta Matas, including Shitala, printed in 'Customs of the World' (1913)

In Punjab, the shrines of the sisters of Shitla are called "matya". There shrines cluster around the central shrine of Shitala. One of them is called Paharwali or of the mountain.

In Uttar Pradesh, Shitala Devi's worship is especially popular among Chamar and Jatav communities.

Other temples include Sheetala Chaukiya Dham, Jaunpur, Uttar Pradesh and Sheetla Mata Mandir, Gurgaon, Haryana

== See also ==
- Lakshmi
- Vishnu
- Ashvins
- Sita
- Dhanvantari
- Mariamman, South Indian deity to ward off smallpox

== Notes ==
- Arnold, D. (1993) Colonizing the Body: State Medicine and Epidemic Disease in Nineteenth-Century India, Berkeley, University of California Press.
- Auboyer, J. and M.T. de Mallmann (1950). ‘Śītalā-la-froide: déesse indienne de la petite vérole’, Artibus Asiae, 13(3): 207–227.
- Bang, B.G. (1973). 'Current concepts of the smallpox goddess Śītalā in West Bengal', Man in India, 53(1):79–104.
- Kinsley, D. Hindu Goddesses: Visions of the Divine Feminine in the Hindu Religious Tradition
- Dimock, E.C. Jr. (1982) 'A Theology of the Repulsive: The Myth of the Goddess Śītalā', in J.S. Hawley and D.M. Wulff (eds), The Divine Consort: Rādhā and the Goddesses of India, Berkeley, University of California Press, 184–203
- Ferrari, Fabrizio M. (2009). "Old rituals for new threats. The post-smallpox career of Sitala, the cold mother of Bengal". In Brosius, C. & U. Hüsken (eds.), Ritual Matters, London & New York, Routledge, pp. 144–171.
- Ferrari, Fabrizio M. (2015). Religion, Devotion and Medicine in North India. The Healing Power of Śītalā. London: Bloomsbury.
- Inhorn, M.C. and P.J. Brown (eds) (2005). The Anthropology of Infectious Disease. International Health Perspectives, Amsterdam, Routledge.
- Junghare, I.Y. (1975) 'Songs of the Goddess Shitala: Religio-cultural and Linguistic Features', Man in India, 55(4): 298–316.
- Katyal, A.; N. Kishore (2001) 'Performing the goddess: sacred ritual into professional performance', The Drama Review, 45(1), 96–117.
- Kolenda, P. (1982) 'Pox and the Terror of Childlessness: Images and Ideas of the Smallpox Goddess in a North Indian Village', in J.J. Preston (ed.), Mother Worship, Chapel Hill, University of North Carolina Press, 227–250
- Mukhopadhyay, S.K. (1994) Cult of Goddess Śītalā in Bengal: An Enquiry into Folk Culture, Calcutta, Firma KLM.
- Nicholas, R. (2003). Fruits of Worship. Practical Religion in Bengal, Chronicle Books, New Delhi.
- Stewart, T.K. (1995) 'Encountering the Smallpox Goddess: The Auspicious Song of Śītalā', in D.S. Lopez, Jr. (ed.), Religious of India in Practice, Princeton, Princeton University Press, 389–397.
- Wadley, S.S. (1980), 'Śītalā: The Cool One', Asian Folklore Studies, 39: 33–62.
