= Saesara =

Eleusinian princess and daughter of King Celeus

In Greek mythology, Saesara (Ancient Greek: Σαισάρα, romanized: Saisára, lit. 'the grinning one') was an Eleusinian princess as the daughter of King Celeus and possibly Metaneira, and thus probably the sister of Callidice, Demo, Cleisidice, Callithoe, Diogeneia, Pammerope, Demophon, and Triptolemus. She married Crocon and became the mother of Meganeira, wife of Arcas, son of Zeus and Callisto.
