= Eleusis (mythology) =

Son of Hermes and the Oceanid Daeira

- Eponym of Eleusis
- Other names: Eleusinus
- Abode: Eleusis
- Parents: Hermes and Daeira, or Ogygus
- Consort: Cothonea
- Offspring: Triptolemus

In Greek mythology, Eleusis (/ɪˈljuːsɪs/ ih-LEW-siss) or Eleusinus (Ancient Greek: Ἐλευσίς, romanized: Eleusís) was the eponymous hero of the town of Eleusis.

== Family ==
Eleusis was a son of Hermes and the Oceanid Daeira, or of Ogygus. Panyassis wrote of him as father of Triptolemus, adding that "Demeter came to him"; this version of the myth is found in the works of Hyginus and Servius. In other accounts, Eleusis had no offspring.

== Mythology ==
King Eleusis and Cothonea (Cyntinia), parents of Triptolemus, are visited by Demeter, who rears their son, feeding him divine milk by day and placing him into the fire at night, which makes Triptolemus grow faster than mortal children normally do. She eventually kills Eleusis for intervening when the fire ritual is performed. The myth is closely parallel with the one that deals with Demeter visiting Celeus and Metaneira (also possible parents of Triptolemus) and nursing their son Demophon.

In other accounts, Eleusis appears as a female character.

== See also ==
- List of Greek deities
