= Rarus =

Son of Cranaus, eponym of the Rharian Field

In Greek mythology, Rarus (Ancient Greek: Ρ̓ᾶρος, Râros) or Rar (Ρ̓ᾶρ, Râr) was a son of Cranaus, eponym of the Rarian Field near Eleusis, and a possible father of Triptolemus by an unnamed daughter of Amphictyon. According to Suda, Rarus was the father of Celeus and through him grandfather of Triptolemus. He received Demeter hospitably as she was searching for her daughter Persephone, and the goddess, in reward, taught his grandson the art of cultivating crops.
