= Crocon =

Greek mythological character

In Greek mythology, Crocon (Ancient Greek: Κρόκωνος, romanized: Krókōn, lit. 'saffron' or 'saffron-yellow') was the husband of Saesara, daughter of Celeus of Eleusis. This couple became the parents of Meganeira, mother of Apheidas and Elatus by Arcas, son of Zeus and Callisto.
