= Rarian Field =

Place in Eleusis, Greece, associated with the Eleusinian Mysteries

The Rarian Field or Rarian Plain (Ancient Greek: Ρ̓άριον Πεδίον, Rárion Pedíon, [rá.ri.on pe.dí.on]) was located in Eleusis in Greece and was supposedly where the first plot of grain was grown after Demeter (through Triptolemus) taught humanity agriculture. It was associated with the Eleusinian Mysteries.

Demeter was often given the epithet Rarias (Ρ̓αριάς) after the field, or after its mythical eponym Rarus.
