= Cleisidice =

In Greek mythology, Cleisidice or Clisidice (Ancient Greek: Κλεισιδίκη, romanized: Kleisidíkē, lit. 'she who locks/ holds justice' or 'the key to justice') was an Eleusinian princess as the daughter of King Celeus and Metaneira. Her name was often associated with the root kleis (key, or "she who locks/ holds") and dike (justice).

== Mythology ==
Together with her sisters Demo, Callidice and Callithoe, Clisidice met the goddess Demeter at the virgin well Callichoros in Eleusis, who was resting there in the form of an old woman in search of her daughter Persephone, who was stolen by Hades, and invited her to her father's house.

== Reference ==
- The Homeric Hymns and Homerica with an English Translation by Hugh G. Evelyn-White. Homeric Hymns. Cambridge, MA.,Harvard University Press; London, William Heinemann Ltd. 1914. Online version at the Perseus Digital Library. Greek text available from the same website.
