= Demo (mythology) =

In Greek mythology, Demo (Ancient Greek: Δημώ, lit. 'the people' or 'the populace') may refer to the following person:

- Demo, an Eleusinian princess as the daughter of King Celeus and Metaneira. Together with her sisters Callidike, Cleisidike and Callithoe, she met the goddess Demeter at the virgin well Callichoros in Eleusis, who was resting there in the form of an old woman in search of her daughter Persephone, who was stolen by Hades, and invited her to her father's house.
- Demo, a Cumaean Sibyl whose oracles were unpreserved. A stone urn in the sanctuary of Apollo kept her bones. She could have been the Sibyl that led Aeneas.
- Demo, a name of Demeter.
