= Callithoe (mythology) =

Daughter of Celeus in Greek mythology

In Greek mythology, Callithoe or Kallithoe (Ancient Greek: Καλλιθόη, romanized: Kallithóē, lit. 'beautiful runner' or 'good runner') was an Eleusinian princess as the eldest daughter of King Celeus and Metaneira. Her name derives from the Greek roots kallos (beauty) and theo (to run).

== Mythology ==
Together with her sisters Demo, Callidice and Cleisidice, Callithoe encountered the goddess Demeter at the virgin well Callichoros in Eleusis, who was resting there in the disguise of an old woman (Doso) in search of her daughter Persephone, who was stolen by Hades, and invited her to her father's house.

== Reference ==
- The Homeric Hymns and Homerica with an English Translation by Hugh G. Evelyn-White. Homeric Hymns. Cambridge, MA.,Harvard University Press; London, William Heinemann Ltd. 1914. Online version at the Perseus Digital Library. Greek text available from the same website.
