= Triptolemus =

Greek mythological character

- Patron of the Eleusinian Mysteries; Founder of Agriculture; Judge of the Afterlife
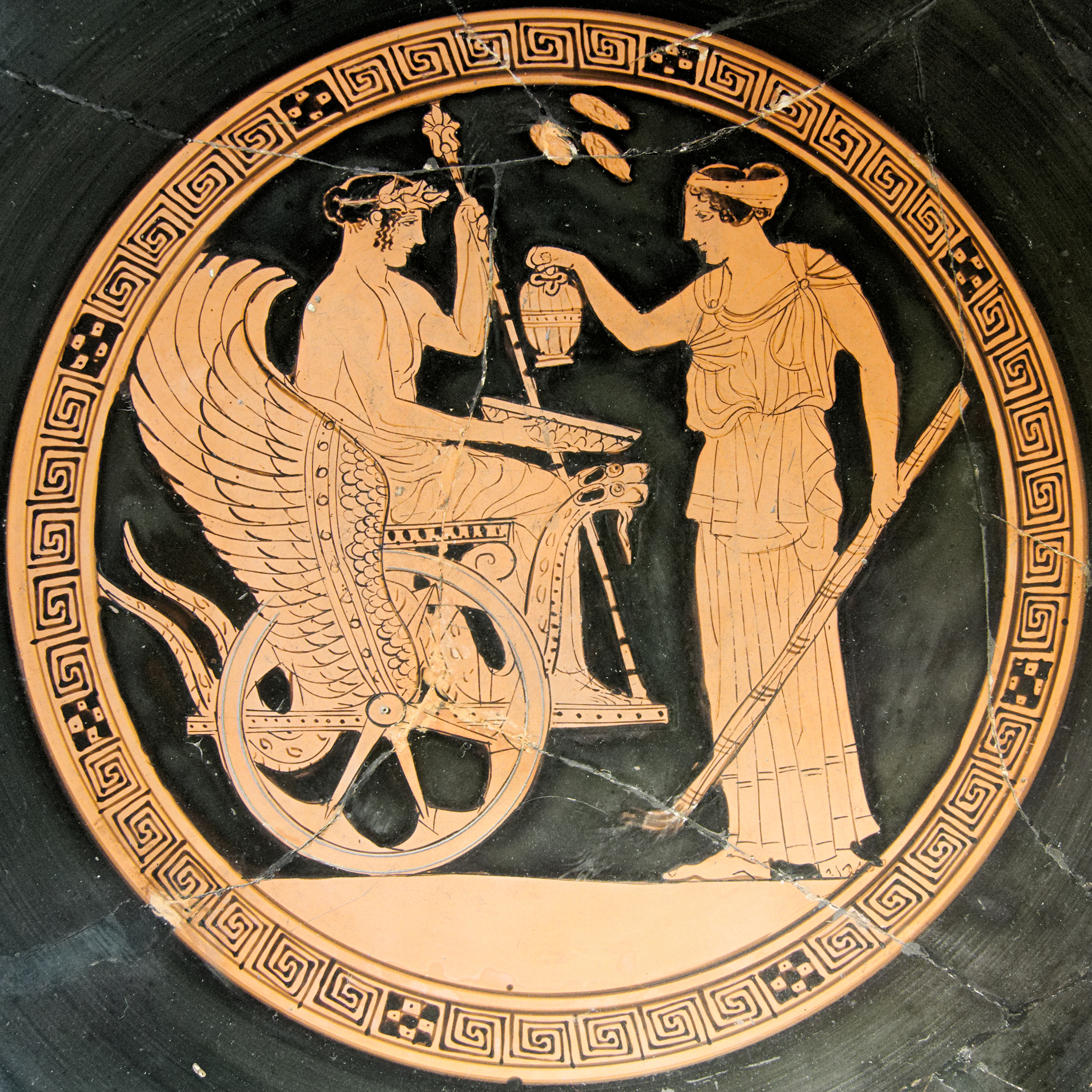
- Triptolemus and Persephone, tondo of a red-figure Attic cup, ca. 470 BC–460 BC
- Abode: Eleusis, Elysium, Hades
- Mount: Dragon-drawn chariot
- Parents: Oceanus and Gaia, or Celeus and Metanira

Triptolemus /ˌtrɪpˈtɒlɪməs/ (Ancient Greek: Τριπτόλεμος, romanized: Triptólemos, lit. 'Tripartite warrior'), also known as Buzyges (Ancient Greek: Βουζύγης, romanized: Bouzýgēs, lit. 'Bull-hitcher'), was a hero of Eleusis in Greek mythology, central to the Eleusinian Mysteries and is worshipped as the inventor and patron of agriculture. Triptolemus is credited with being the first to sow seed for cultivation after being taught by Demeter and is credited for the use of oxen and the plough. Xenophon claims that Peloponnesus was the first place Triptolemus shared Demeter's agricultural gift while Pausanias claims the Rharium plane near Eleusis was the first place to be sown for crops.

Triptolemus is depicted as a young man with a branch or diadem placed in his hair, usually sitting on his chariot, adorned with serpents. His attributes include a plate of grain, a pair of wheat or barley ears and a scepter.

== Mythology ==
=== Origin of Triptolemus' Agricultural Gifts ===
Triptolemus' first introduction to Demeter is during Demeter's search for her daughter following the abduction of Persephone. While Demeter, in the guise of an old woman named Doso, was searching for her daughter Persephone (Kore), who had been abducted by Hades (Pluto), she received a hospitable welcome from Celeus, the King of Eleusis. He asked her to nurse Demophon ("killer of men", a counterpart to Triptolemus) and Triptolemus, his sons by Metanira.

Demeter saw Triptolemus was sick and fed him her breast milk and placed him under the hot coals of a fire. Not only did this recover his strength but he grew instantly into manhood. As a gift to Celeus, in gratitude for his hospitality, Demeter secretly planned to make Demophon immortal by placing him in the flames of the hearth to strip him of his mortal flesh. With each day Demophon grew but she was unable to complete the ritual because she was discovered burying the babe in the fire.

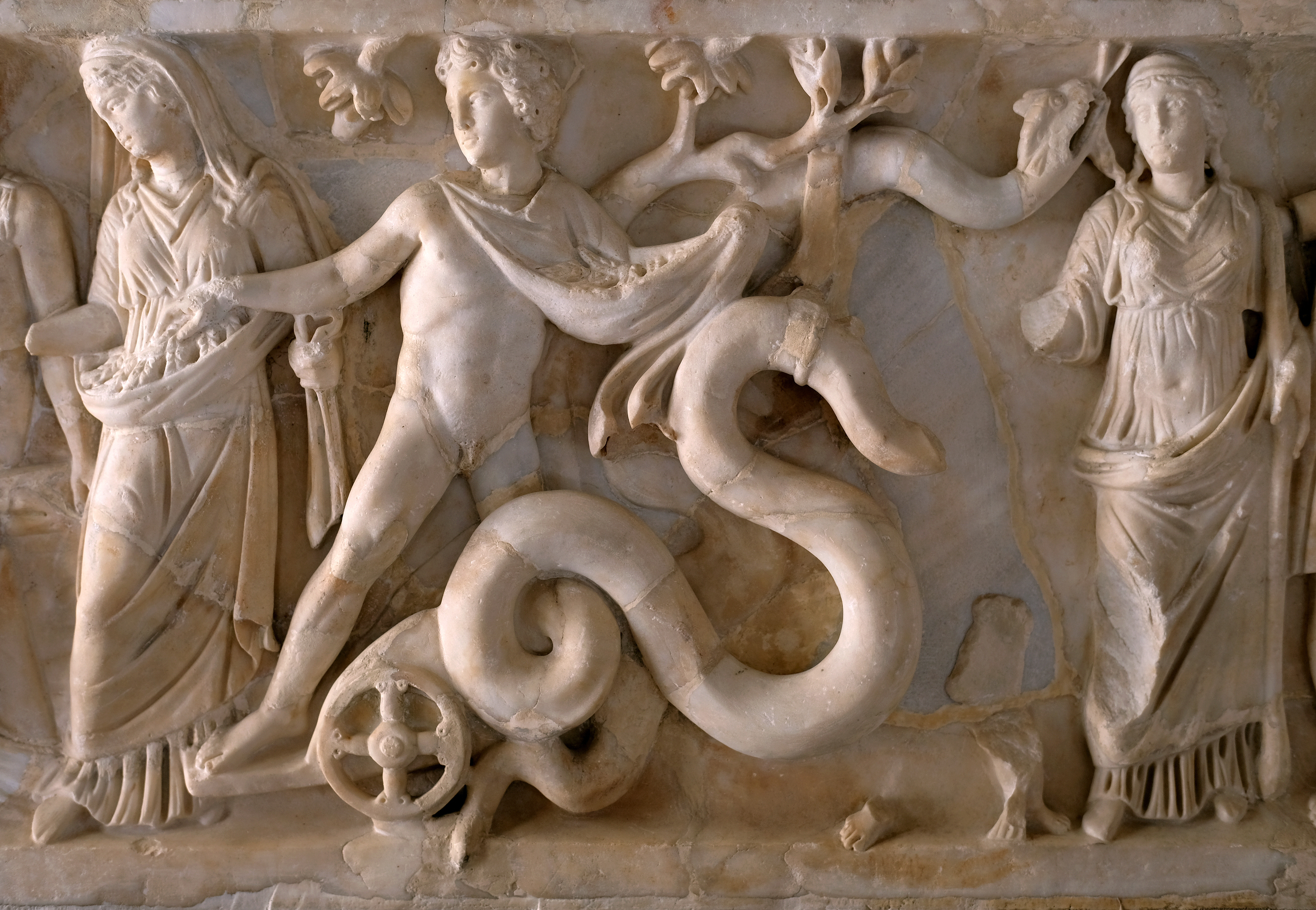
Triptolemus on a 2nd-century Roman sarcophagus (Louvre Museum).

Instead, Demeter gifted Triptolemus a chariot drawn by winged dragons or serpents and wheat, representative of the gift of agriculture. Demeter taught Triptolemus the art of agriculture and shared with him how to conduct her rites and taught him her mysteries. From Triptolemus, the rest of Greece learned to plant and reap crops as he flew across the land on his chariot wafting the wheat through the air to sow crops across the inhabitied earth. Demeter and Persephone, once restored to her mother, cared for him, and helped him complete his mission of educating the whole world in the art of agriculture.

In the Homeric Hymn to Demeter, Triptolemus is not a son of Celeus and Metanira but rather known as a king of Eleusis who served justice, and Demeter is asked to nurse their only son Demophon. Rather than nurse Demophon, Demeter anoints him with ambrosia, the food of the gods, breathes on him gently while holding him to her chest, and places him within the flames of fire during the night, all in an effort to make him immortal. Demeter is foiled in her plan in this retelling as well.

Triptolemus was equally associated with the bestowal of hope for the afterlife associated with the expansion of the Eleusinian Mysteries.

=== Spreading the Art of Agriculture ===
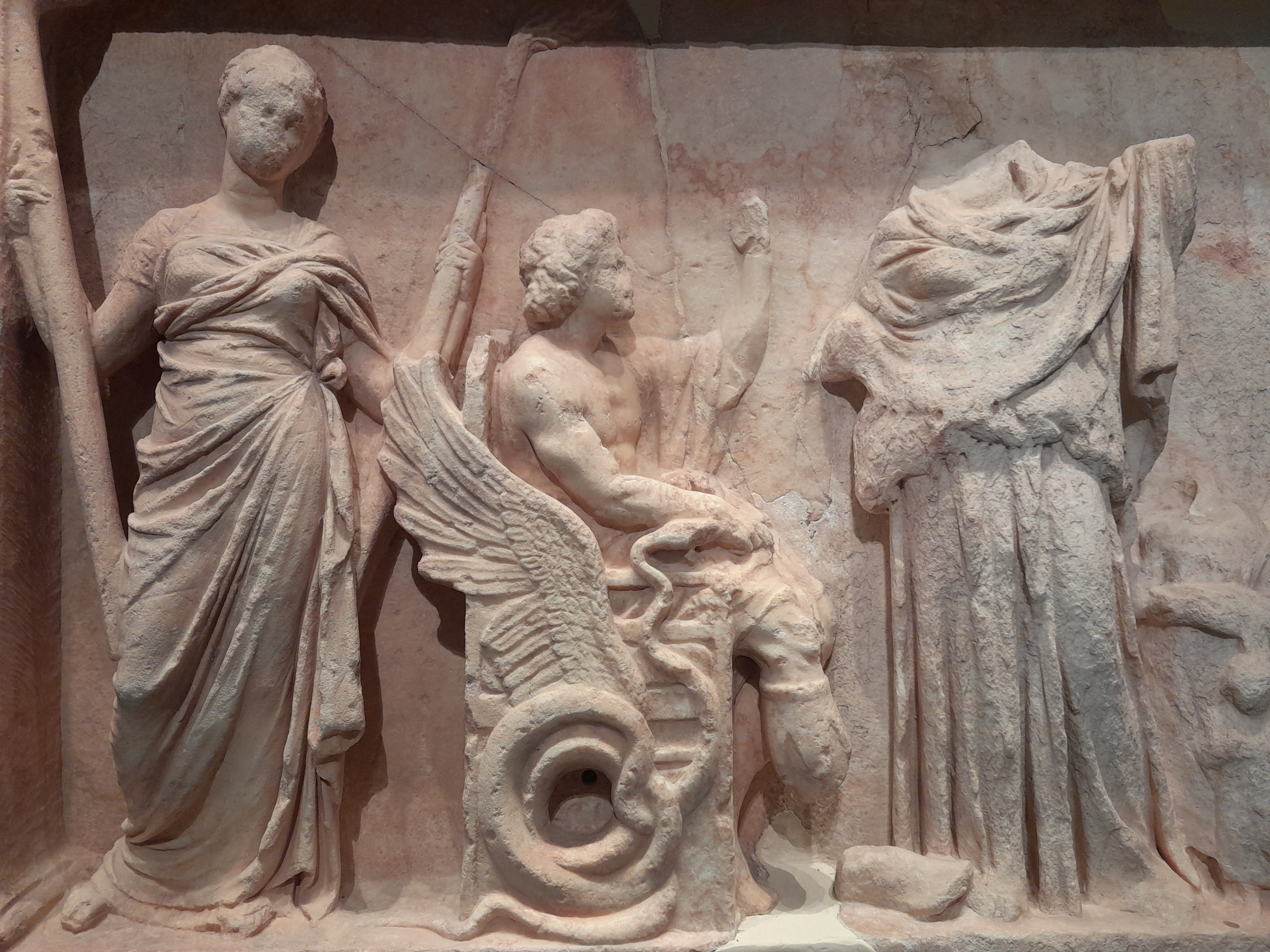
Marble relief of Triptolemus, Demeter, and Persephone at the Archaeological Museum of Eleusis, Greece

Triptolemus traveled to Scythia on his dragon drawn chariot to teach King Lyncus and the Scythians the art of agriculture. Bearing the gifts of Demeter, he scattered seeds across Scythia so the realm may yield a large harvest of good food. Lyncus grew envious of Triptolemus and his gift of agriculture, so he planned to murder Triptolemus while he slept, hoping that he could receive the praise for the harvest instead. Before Lyncus could enact his plan he was thwarted by Demeter who turned him into a lynx as punishment and sent Triptolemus back into the sky in her chariot.

Triptolemus also traveled to the kingdom of Getae where he intended to continue to spread the art of agriculture and share grain with the people. The king of Getae, Charnabon (also spelt Carnabon) made an attempt at Triptolemus' life, seizing him and ordering one of the chariot dragons to be killed to keep Triptolemus from escaping. Again Demeter came to Triptolemus' rescue, returning the chariot to him and replacing the lost dragon.

Traveling from Attica, Triptolemus went to the city of Patrae located near the river Peirus and the river Glaucus. The land was ruled by Eumelus, who was said to be indigenous to the land, and he was king over few subjects. Triptolemus shared with him cultivated corn and taught him how to found a city, which Eumelus named Aroe from the tilling of soil or fertile land. The son of Eumelus, Antheias, attempted to sow the seed of agriculture himself by using the dragon drawn chariot while Triptolemus slept, but Antheias fell from the car and was killed. Eumelus and Triptolemus then founded another nearby city and named it Antheia for his lost son.

Triptolemus is credited with teaching the cultivation of crops to the Pelasgian later known as the Arcadians. He taught Arcas, the son of Callisto and the King of Pelasgia (later Arcadia) following the death of Nyctimus.

=== Eleusinian Mysteries ===
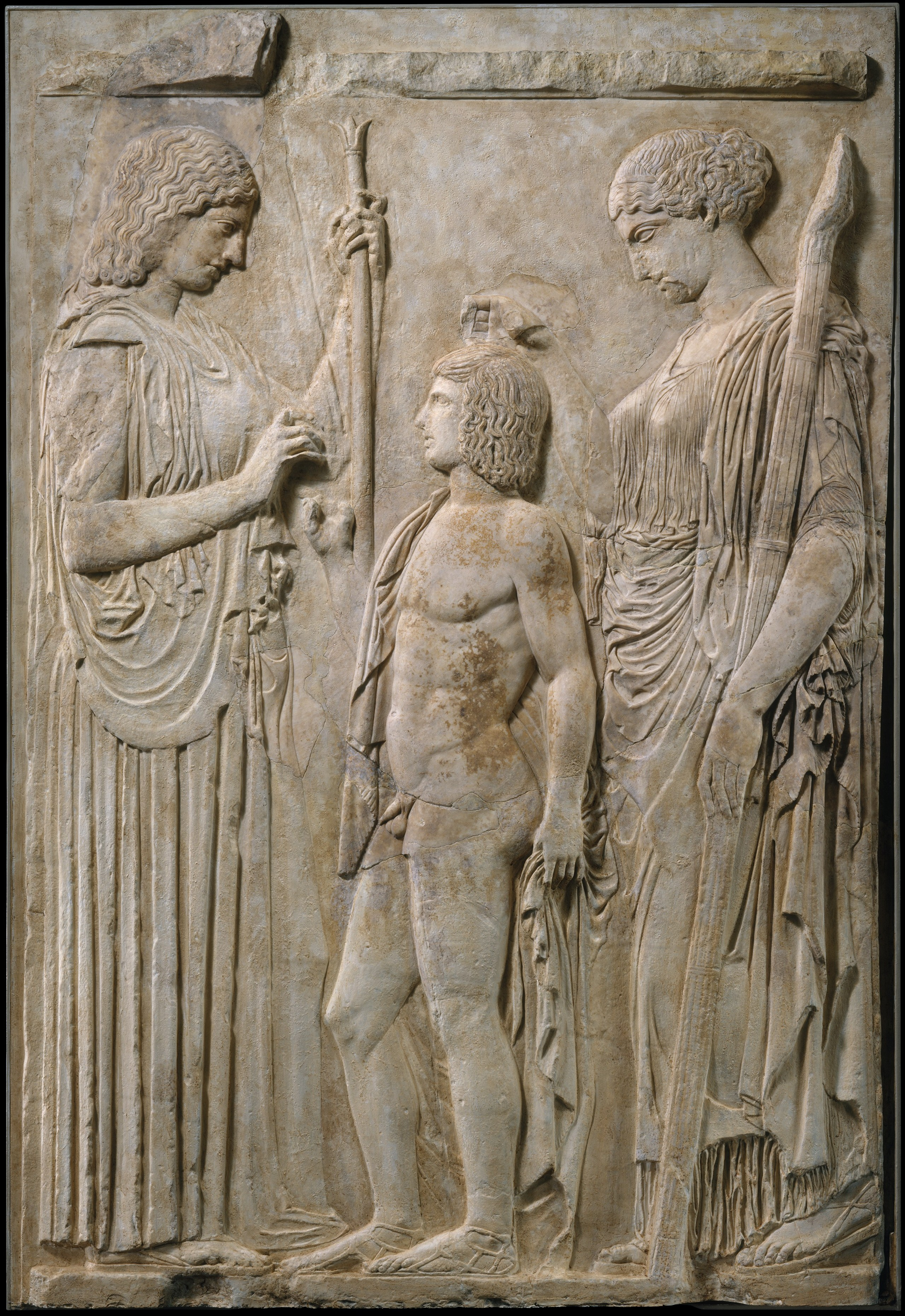
Roman copy of the Great Eleusinian Relief depicting a scene of young Triptolemus standing between Demeter and Persephone. Demeter is handing Triptolemus ears of grain (now lost), Metropolitan Museum of Art.

The Eleusinian Mysteries were initiations held every year for the cult of Demeter and Persephone based at the Panhellenic Sanctuary of Eleusis in ancient Greece. They are considered the "most famous of the secret religious rites of ancient Greece".

In the archaic Homeric Hymn to Demeter, Triptolemus is briefly mentioned as one of the original priests of Demeter, one of the first men to learn the secret rites and mysteries of Eleusinian Mysteries: Diocles driver of horses, the mighty Eumolpos, Celeus leader of peoples, and Polyxeinus were the others mentioned as some of the first priests. According to Xenophon, Triptolemus first shares the rites of Demeter and Persephone with Heracles, the traditional ancestor of the Spartan kings, and the Dioscuri, twin deities Castor and Pollux. Celeus or the peasant Dysaules may be substituted for Triptolemus as the primordial Eleusinian recipient of the first gifts of the Mysteries.

Triptolemus' role at Eleusis is unique as he was one of the first men to learn the mystic rites and was a pupil of Demeter who was charged with bringing agriculture to humankind. Separate from the Mysteries, Triptolemus was thought to have a cult of his own as he had a temples dedicated to him in Athens and Eleusis. It is said that temples and alters were erected in his honor because he gave the people food by cultivation and shared with them the way to not only live but to live well. In the 5th-century bas-relief in the National Museum, Athens (illustration), which probably came from his temple, the boy Triptolemus stands between the two Goddesses, Demeter and the Kore, and receives from Demeter a golden ear of grain (now lost).

Triptolemus was given three commandments to living a simple and pious life: "Honor your parents", "Honor the gods with fruits"—for the Greeks, this includes grains—and "Spare the animals".

=== Judge of the Afterlife ===
Socrates names Triptolemus as one of the judges in the afterlife along with three sons of Zeus, Minos, Rhadamanthus, and Aeacus. Each of the judges had their own roles in the afterlife: Aeacus was the doorkeeper and judged the deceased of Europe, Rhadamanthus was the Lord of Elysium and judged the deceased of Asia, and Minos was to be the deal breaker if any indeceasion was reached. Triptolemus was said to have rule over the deceased who were initiated into the mysteries.

=== Parentage ===
Triptolemus' parentage is highly debated across sources: He was either a mortal prince and the eldest son of King Celeus of Eleusis and Metanira or according to Pseudo-Apollodorus, Panyasis believed he was the son of Eleusis, while Pherecydes believed he was the son of the divine son of Gaia and Oceanus (Ocean and Earth). Multiple other parentage combinations have been mentioned by other authors as seen in the comparative table. Triptolemus was said to be the ancestor to a royal priestly caste of the Eleusinian Mysteries, who claimed to be Buzygae (Βουζύγαι), that taught agriculture and performed secret rites and rituals, of which Pericles was its most famous descendant.

Comparative Table of Triptolemus' Parentage and Siblings According to Different Sources
| Relation | Names | | Sources | | | | | | | | | | | |
|---|---|---|---|---|---|---|---|---|---|---|---|---|---|---|
| Relation | Names | Schol. on Hesiod | Orphic Fragment | Pherecydes of Athens | Musaeus of Athens | Choerilus | Panyasis | Ovid | Sch. on Statius | Pseudo-Apollodorus | Hyginus | Pausanias | Servius | Athenians |
| Parentage | Cheimarrhoos and Polymnia | ✓ | | | | | | | | | | | | |
| Parentage | Dysaules | | ✓ | | | | | | | | | ✓ | | |
| Parentage | Oceanus and Gaia | | | ✓ | ✓ | | | | | ✓ | | ✓ | | |
| Parentage | Rarus and daughter of Amphictyon | | | | | ✓ | | | | | | ✓ | | |
| Parentage | Celeus | | | | | | | | | | | ✓ | | ✓ |
| Parentage | Celeus and Metanira | | | | | | | ✓ | | ✓ | | ✓ | | |
| Parentage | Celeus and Polymnia | | | | | | | | | | | | | |
| Parentage | Eleusis | | | | | | ✓ | | | ✓ | | | | |
| Parentage | Eleusis and Hyona | | | | | | | | ✓ | | | | | |
| Parentage | Eleusis and Cothonea | | | | | | | | | | ✓ | | | |
| Parentage | Eleusis and Cyntinea | | | | | | | | | | | | ✓ | |
| Parentage | Trochilus and Eleusinian woman | | | | | | | | | | | ✓ | | |
| Siblings | Eubuleus | | ✓ | | | | | | | | | ✓ | | |
| Siblings | Cercyon (half-brother) | | | | | ✓ | | | | | | ✓ | | |
| Siblings | Diogeneia | | | | | | | | | | | ✓ | | |
| Siblings | Pammerope | | | | | | | | | | | ✓ | | |
| Siblings | Saesara | | | | | | | | | | | ✓ | | |

== See also ==
- Indra
- Eleusinsian Mysteries
- Eleusis
