= Amarynceus =

Ancient Greek mythological figure

Amarynceus (Ancient Greek: Ἀμαρυγκεύς) was in Greek mythology, a chief of the Eleans.

== Family ==
Amarynceus was the son of Onesimachus or of Acetor (Alector) and Diogeneia. In some accounts, his father was the Thessalian immigrant Pyttius.

Mnesimache, daughter of Dexamenus of Olenus, was the mother of his son Diores while the other son Hippostratus was said have seduced Periboea, daughter of Hipponous.

== Mythology ==
According to Hyginus, Amarynceus himself joined the expedition against Troy with nineteen ships. Homer, on the other hand, only mentions Amarynceus' son Diores (also known by the patronymic Amarynceides) as partaking in the Trojan War.

When Amarynceus died, his sons celebrated funeral games in his honor, in which Nestor took part. According to Pausanias, Amarynceus had been of great service to Augeas against Heracles, in return for which Augeas shared his throne with him.
