= Charnabon =

King of the Getae in Greek mythology

In Greek mythology, Charnabon (Ancient Greek "Χαρναβών", gen. "Χαρναβώντος") was a king of the Getae, mentioned in Sophocles' tragedy Triptolemos as ruling the Getae, without a precise geographical location of his kingdom.

== Mythology ==
Although the play survived only in brief fragments, the myth of Charnabon and Triptolemus is preserved in the Poetical Astronomy by Hyginus (who refers to the king as "Carnabon"), and runs as follows:

When Triptolemus, while on his mission to introduce agriculture in various parts of the world, came to Thrace, he was at first hospitably received by Carnabon; but then the king treacherously seized his guest and was about to kill him. Triptolemus could not escape, as Carnabon had killed one of the dragons that pulled his chariot. He was rescued by Demeter, who restored the chariot to him and substituted another dragon. She punished Carnabon for having mistreated Triptolemus so harshly that the rest of his life was made unbearable. After his death, he was placed among the stars as the constellation Ophiuchus, which reminds the observer of a man holding a serpent as if to kill it, in remembrance of his crime and punishment.

== See also ==
- List of Greek deities
