= Aeschylia Festival =

Artistic festival in Elefsina, Greece

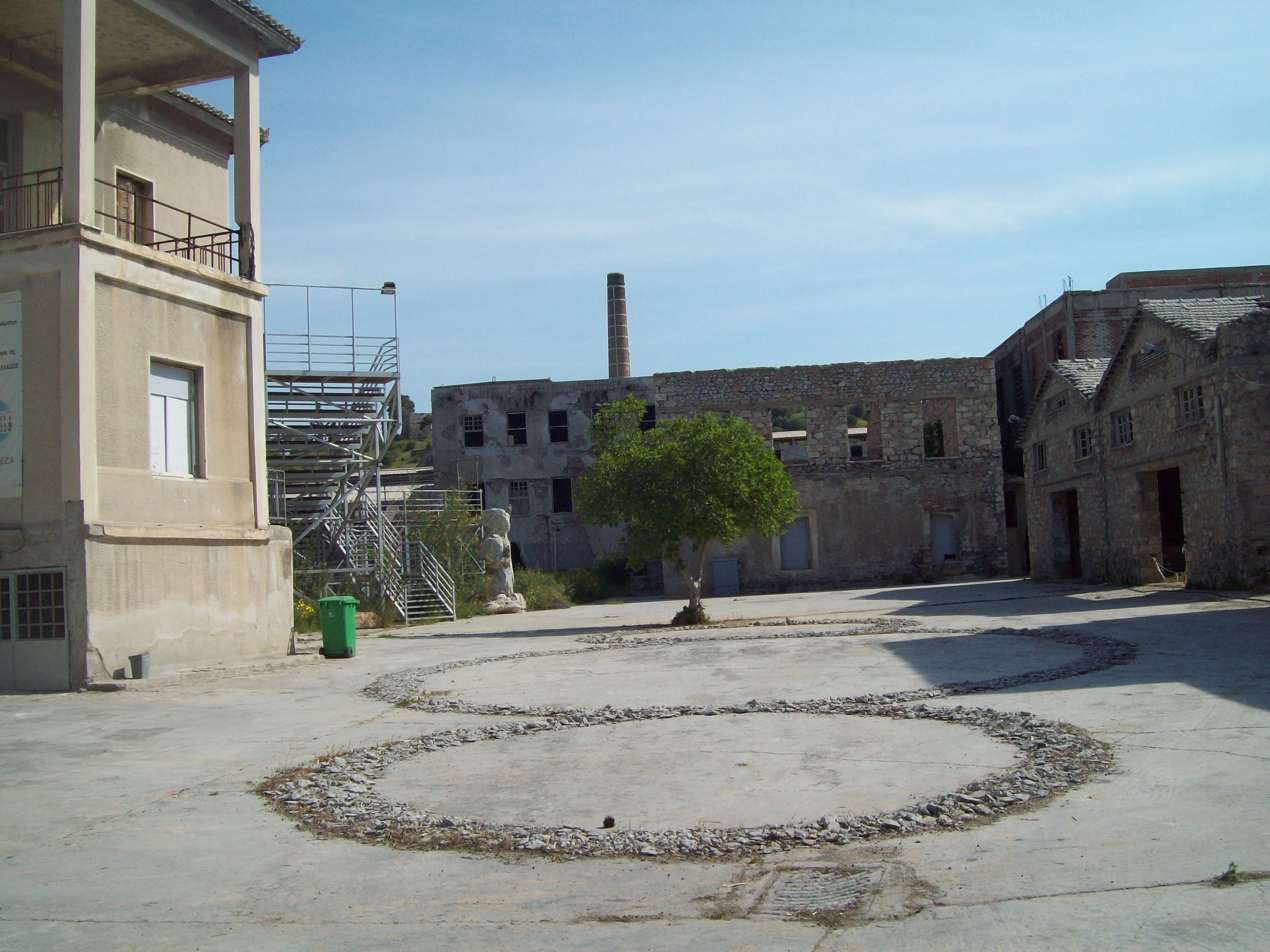
The location where the event takes place, mainly the theatre plays.

Aeschylia Festival is the annual artistic festival of the city of Elefsina in West Attica, Greece.

== Creation ==
The institution of the artistic events that take place in Elefsina was established in 1975 and owes its name to the ancient Greek tragedian Aeschylus, who originated from the city. The responsibility of the organizing lies with the municipality of Elefsina and a large number of volunteers.

== Art events ==
This annual artistic event takes place at the end of Summer and at the beginning of Autumn (usually beginning at the end of August and lasting until early September). The main program contains a large number of diverse events such as theatre plays, music concerts, dances, visual art exhibitions and installations, cinema projections and others. With the passage of time the program is being enriched and now it constitutes a very important cultural event, not only for the town of Elefsina but for the wider region of Attica.

== Location ==
The vast majority of the events take place at an abandoned industrial factory (formerly a soap factory that had been built in 1875) near the beach of Elefsina, with the exclusion of the first concert that takes place at the archeological site of the town, the location emphasizes the relation of the town with the modern industrial activity of Greece. The theatre plays are performed at a prefabricated metal and wooden theatre while the surrounding buildings are used for art installations and other artistic activities of the festival.

== Other activities ==
In addition to the main program of the Aeschylia festival, each year a plethora of other events take place that are connected with it. For example, the most notable event is the Semi-marathon "On the Traces of Iera Odos" of 21 km (Athens- Elefsina) which also is held annually.
