= Lyncus =

Scythian king in Greek mythology

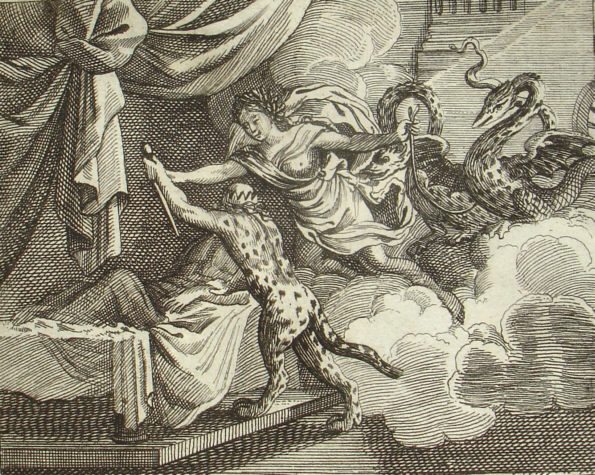
Demeter transforms Lyncus into a lynx

In Greek mythology, King Lyncus (Greek: Λύγκος, pronounced [ˈlyŋkos]) of the Scythians was taught the arts of agriculture by Triptolemus but he refused to teach it to his people and then tried to kill Triptolemus. Demeter turned him into a lynx as punishment.

== Mythology ==
The myth is not known from any extant Greek sources, but it is found in Ovid's Metamorphoses 5.648-661

Now the youth [i.e. Triptolemus] was carried high over Europe and Asia. He turned his face towards Scythia where Lyncus was king. He stood before the king's household gods. He was asked how he had come there, and the reason for his journey, his name, and his country. He said 'Athens, the famous city, is my home, Triptolemus, my name. I came not by ship, on the sea, or by foot, overland. The clear air parted for me. I bring you the gifts of Ceres. If you scatter them through the wide fields, they will give you back fruitful harvests, and ripening crops.' The barbarian was jealous. So that he might be the author, of so great a gift, he received him like a guest, but attacked Triptolemus, with a sword, while he was in deep sleep. As he attempted to pierce the youth's breast, Ceres turned the king into a lynx, then ordered the Athenian youth to drive the sacred yoke back through the air.
