= Diogeneia =

Greek Mythological Woman

In Greek mythology, Diogeneia or Diogenia (/daɪoʊˈdʒiːniə/; Ancient Greek: Διογένεια or Διογενία, lit. 'divine born' or 'descendant of the gods') may refer to three women in Greek mythology:

- Diogeneia, daughter of the river god Cephissus and the wife of Phrasimus by whom she became the mother of Praxithea, wife of King Erechtheus.
- Diogeneia, an Eleusinian princess as one of the daughters of King Celeus and Metanira.
- Diogeneia, daughter of Phorbas, from Olenus in Achaea, and possibly Hyrmina, thus sister to Augeas, Actor and Tiphys. She was the wife of King Alector of Elis and mother of Amarynceus. Otherwise, the latter was called the son of Onesimachus
