= Callidice =

Name in Greek mythology

In Greek mythology, Callidice (/kəˈlɪdɪsiː/; Ancient Greek: Καλλιδίκη, romanized: Kallidíkē, lit. 'beautiful justice') is a feminine name attributed to several individuals.

- Callidice, an Eleusinian princess as one of the daughters of King Celeus and Metaneira, sister of Cleisidice, Demo and Callithoe.
- Callidice, one of the Danaids. She married (and killed) Pandion, son of Aegyptus
- Callidice, queen of Thesprotia and wife of Odysseus. She and Odysseus had a son Polypoetes. According to the Telegony, Odysseus was sent on another voyage by the gods after killing all of Penelope's suitors. When Callidice died, Odysseus returned home to Ithaca, leaving their son to rule.

== See also ==
- Thesprotians
- Telegony
