= Demophon (son of Celeus) =

Eleusinian prince in Greek mythology

In Greek mythology, Demophon or Demophöon (Ancient Greek: Δημοφῶν or Δημοφόων), was an Eleusinian prince as the son of King Celeus and Queen Metanira.

== Mythology ==
While Demeter, having taken the form of an old woman called Doso, searched for her lost daughter Persephone, she received a hospitable welcome from Celeus, the King of Eleusis in Attica. He asked her to nurse Demophon – his son by Metanira.

As a gift to Celeus, because of his hospitality, Demeter planned to make Demophon a god by anointing and coating him with ambrosia, breathing gently upon him while holding him in her arms and bosom, and making him immortal by burning his mortal spirit away in the family's hearth every night. She put him in the fire at night like a firebrand or ember – without the knowledge of his parents:

And thus it came to pass that the splendid son of bright-minded Keleos,
Dêmophôn, who was born to well-girded Metaneira,
was nourished in the palace, and he grew up like a daimôn,
not eating grain, not sucking from the breast. But Demeter
used to anoint him with ambrosia, as if he had been born of the goddess,
and she would breathe down her sweet breath on him as she held him to her bosom.
At nights she would conceal him within the menos of fire, as if he were a smoldering log,
and his philoi parents were kept unaware. But they marveled
at how full in bloom he came to be, and to look at him was like looking at the gods.

Demeter failed to complete the ritual because Demophon's mother Metanira walked in, saw her son in the fire, and screamed in fright; this angered Demeter, who lamented that foolish mortals do not understand the concept and ritual. Demophon would never obtain a life free from death, but Demeter's actions, in fact, prepared and destined him to become immortalized as a recipient of a hero cult.

The bungled immortalization becomes the cause of his death, and funeral games in his honor were established at Eleusis under the guise of a ritual mock-battle, a quasi-athletic event known as the Ballêtus, which took place on a seasonal basis to compensate for the death of the baby cult-hero Demophon. This mock-battle seems to have been the ritual kernel of a whole complex of events known as the Eleusinian Games:

But now there is no way for him to avoid death and doom.
Still, he will have a tîmê that is unwilting, for all time, because he had once sat
on my knees and slept in my arms.
At the right hôrâ, every year,
the sons of the Eleusinians will have a war, a terrible battle
among each other. They will do so for all days to come.

Forestalled in making Demophon immortal, Demeter chose to teach Triptolemus (Demophon's elder brother) the art of agriculture; from him the rest of Greece learned to plant and reap crops. He flew across the land on a dragon-drawn chariot while Demeter and Persephone cared for him and helped him complete his mission of educating the whole of Greece in the art of agriculture.
