= Celeus =

Mythical king at Eleusis

Celeus in mantle with sceptre. Attic red-figure bell-krater c. 460 BC by the Niobid Painter, found in Umbria, Italy.

Celeus (Ancient Greek: Κελεός, romanized: Keleós, pronounced /ˈsiːliəs/, SEE-lee-əs) or Keleos (pronounced /ke.le.ós/, keh-leh-OSS; ) was the king of Eleusis in Greek mythology, husband of Metaneira and father of several daughters, who are called Callidice, Demo, Cleisidice and Callithoe in the Homeric Hymn to Demeter, and Diogeneia, Pammerope and Saesara by Pausanias.

== Etymology ==
Celeus' name was derived from Greek κελεύω (keleuō) which can mean "to command, to order" as well as "to urge (on), to drive on". Robert Graves suggested that Celeus' name can mean ‘burner’ as well as ‘woodpecker’ or ‘sorcerer’.

== Mythology ==
In the Homeric Hymn to Demeter, Celeus was one of the original priests of Demeter, one of the first people to learn the secret rites and mysteries of Demeter's cult the Eleusinian Mysteries. Diocles, Eumolpos, Triptolemus and Polyxeinus were the others of the first priests.

While Demeter was searching for her daughter, having taken the form of an old woman called Doso, she received a hospitable welcome from Celeus, the king of Eleusis in Attica. He asked her to nurse Demophon, his youngest son by Metaneira. As a gift to Celeus, because of his hospitality, Demeter planned to make Demophon immortal by burning his mortal spirit away in the family hearth every night. She was unable to complete the ritual because Metaneira walked in on her one night and interfered with the process. Instead, Demeter chose to teach Triptolemus, the other son of Celeus (though he was ascribed different parentages as well), the art of agriculture and, from him, the rest of Greece learned to plant and reap crops. He flew across the land on a winged chariot while Demeter and Persephone cared for him, and helped him complete his mission of educating the whole of Greece on the art of agriculture.

Celeus was killed by Erichthonius in a war with Athens. His mourning daughters were afterwards transformed into doves by Demeter.
