= Metanira =

Character from Greek mythology

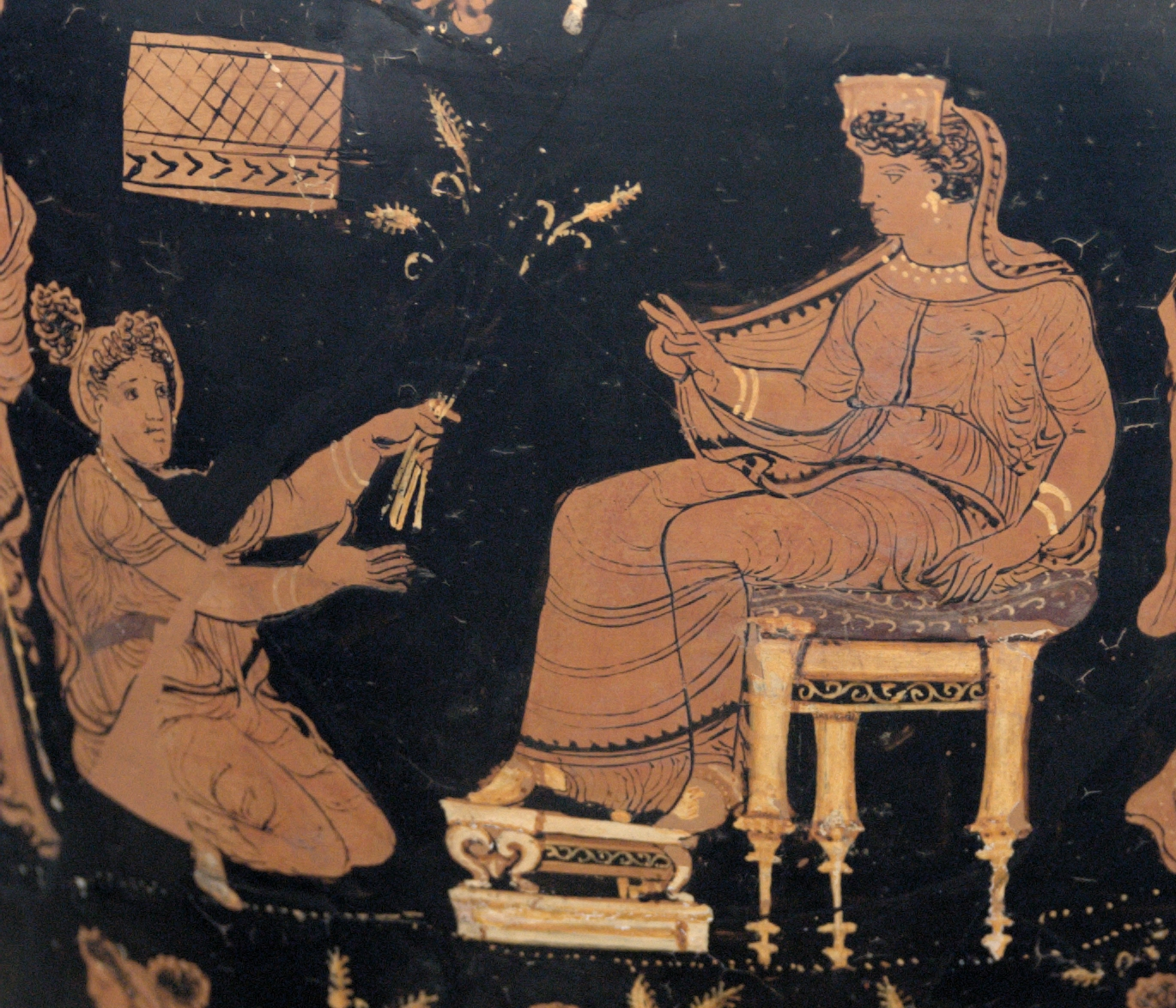
Demeter and Metanira, detail of an Apulian red-figure hydria, Antikensammlung Berlin (1984.46)

In Greek mythology, Metanira (Ancient Greek: Μετάνειρα, romanized: Metáneira; pronounced /ˌmɛtəˈnaɪrə/, meh-tah-NEE-rah) or Meganira was a queen of Eleusis as wife of King Celeus. She was the daughter of Amphictyon, the king of Athens.

The Greek name Metanira translates roughly to "she who changes/ shifts her fate/ mind" or "after-fate / of later design," derived from the elements meta- (denoting change, after, or trans-) and oneiros/ aitho/ neira roots, or more specifically linked to ara (prayer/ ruin) / anira (man or husband) variants which otherwise translates broadly to "she who is among men" or "she who changes with men". Classical etymological breakdown connects it contextually to her mythological persona as a queen touched by divine intervention.

== Mythology ==
While Demeter was searching for her daughter, having taken the form of an old woman called Doso, she received a hospitable welcome from Celeus, the King of Eleusis in Attica. He asked her to nurse Demophoon, his son by Metanira. As a gift to Celeus, because of his hospitality, Demeter planned to make Demophoon immortal by burning his mortal spirit away in the family hearth every night. She was unable to complete the ritual because Metanira walked in on her one night and screamed at seeing her child in flames, which distracted the goddess. Some theories suggested that Demophoon, as a result, was destroyed by the flames, but in other sources he suffered no harm.

In Ovid's Fasti, the baby was Triptolemus and not Demophoon, although in most other versions he was an adult by the time; some sources state that even his parentage was different. However, all versions agree that Demeter chose to teach Triptolemus the art of agriculture and, from him, the rest of Greece learned to plant and reap crops. He flew across the land on a winged chariot while Demeter and Persephone cared for him, and helped him complete his mission of educating the whole of Greece on the art of agriculture. Some mythological traditions tell that Metanira's son Abas mocked Demeter and as punishment was turned into a lizard; others, however, relate this of Ascalabus, son of Misme.
