= Great Eleusinian Relief =

Relief in the National Archaeological Museum, Athens

- Ανάγλυφο Ελευσινίων Μυστηρίων (Greek)
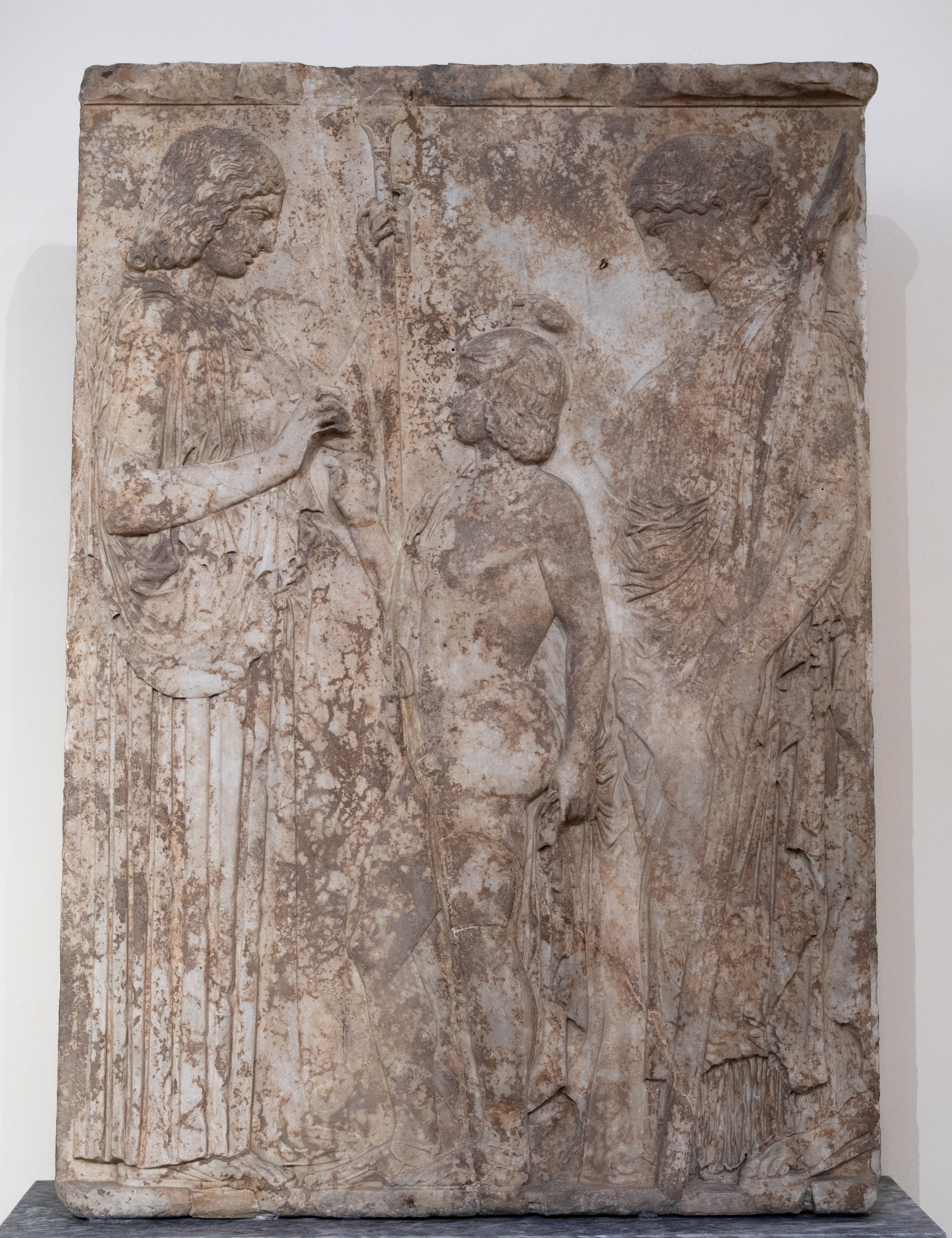
- The marble relief in the NAMA
- Completion date: c. 430-420 BC
- Catalogue: No 126
- Medium: Marble
- Movement: Early Classical
- Subject: Demeter and Persephone bless Triptolemus
- Dimensions: 220 cm × 152 cm (87 in × 60 in)
- Condition: Intact
- Location: National Archaeological Museum, Athens
- Owner: Greece
- Website: https://www.namuseum.gr

The Great Eleusinian Relief (Greek: Μεγάλο Ανάγλυφο Ελευσινίων Μυστηρίων) is a large marble relief kept in the National Archaeological Museum, Athens in Greece. It depicts a scene of the Eleusinian Mysteries with the principal deities, Demeter, Persephone and the hero Triptolemus. The large relief was unearthed in the town of Eleusis, which was an important center for the worship of Demeter and Persephone, in 1859.

== History ==
The relief has been dated to mid-fifth century BC, around 430-420 BC, and it was made for religious use, rather than votive as evidenced from the numerous Roman copies created during the Roman period. It was discovered in Eleusis in 1859 at the sanctuary of Demeter, near a church dedicated to Saint Zacharias. The discovery of the relief greatly rekindled the interest of both Greek and foreign scholars in Eleusis and its archaeological site, and led to more excavation work being undertaken during the 1860s.

== Description ==
The relief is made of Pentelic marble, and it is 2,20 m. tall, 1,52 m. wide, and 15 cm thick. It depicts the three most important figures of the Eleusianian Mysteries; the goddess of agriculture and abundance Demeter, her daughter Persephone queen of the Underworld and the Eleusinian hero Triptolemus, the son of Queen Metanira, in what appears to be a rite. Triptolemus stands in the center, the two goddesses surrounding him on the left and right.

The goddess on the left is dressed in a leg-length sleeveless chiton and himation (a type of cloak), holds a sceptre in her left hand, while with her right one she hands Triptolemus some unidentified object either made of a separate piece of copper or perhaps painted on originally, commonly agreed now to have been sheaves of wheat.

The child Triptolemus reaches to receive the goddess's gift with his right hand, while holding his robe with his left. The goddess on the right rests her weight her right leg, and wears a foot-long chiton and a rich pleated himation. In her left hand she holds a large torch reaching the ground, while with her right she touches the head of Triptolemus, perhaps originally holding some sort of wreath, or blessing the boy.

It is generally accepted that the goddess on the left is Demeter and the one in the right is Persephone, but arguments for the opposite have also been expressed. Namely, it has been noted that the right figure is dressed more lightly like a maiden, whereas the right figure sports the rich garments suitable for an older woman.

== Copies ==
The original relief had several copies made of it during Roman times, many of which survive; a copy of it is kept at the Metropolitan Museum of Art in New York City, embedded from ten Roman fragments of the first century BC and the first century AD. A modern copy made of plaster is also exhibited in the Archaeological Museum of Eleusis in Eleusis, the town near Athens where the original was excavated.

In 2017, Charles Ray made a copy of the Metropolitan Museum of Art's Roman copy in machined aluminum.

A very similar scene is also depicted on a skyphos from Boeotia, with a rich-dressed Demeter handing the laurel-wreathed Triptolemus some wheat, while Persephone stands behind him holding two torches.

== Gallery ==
Great Eleusinian Relief

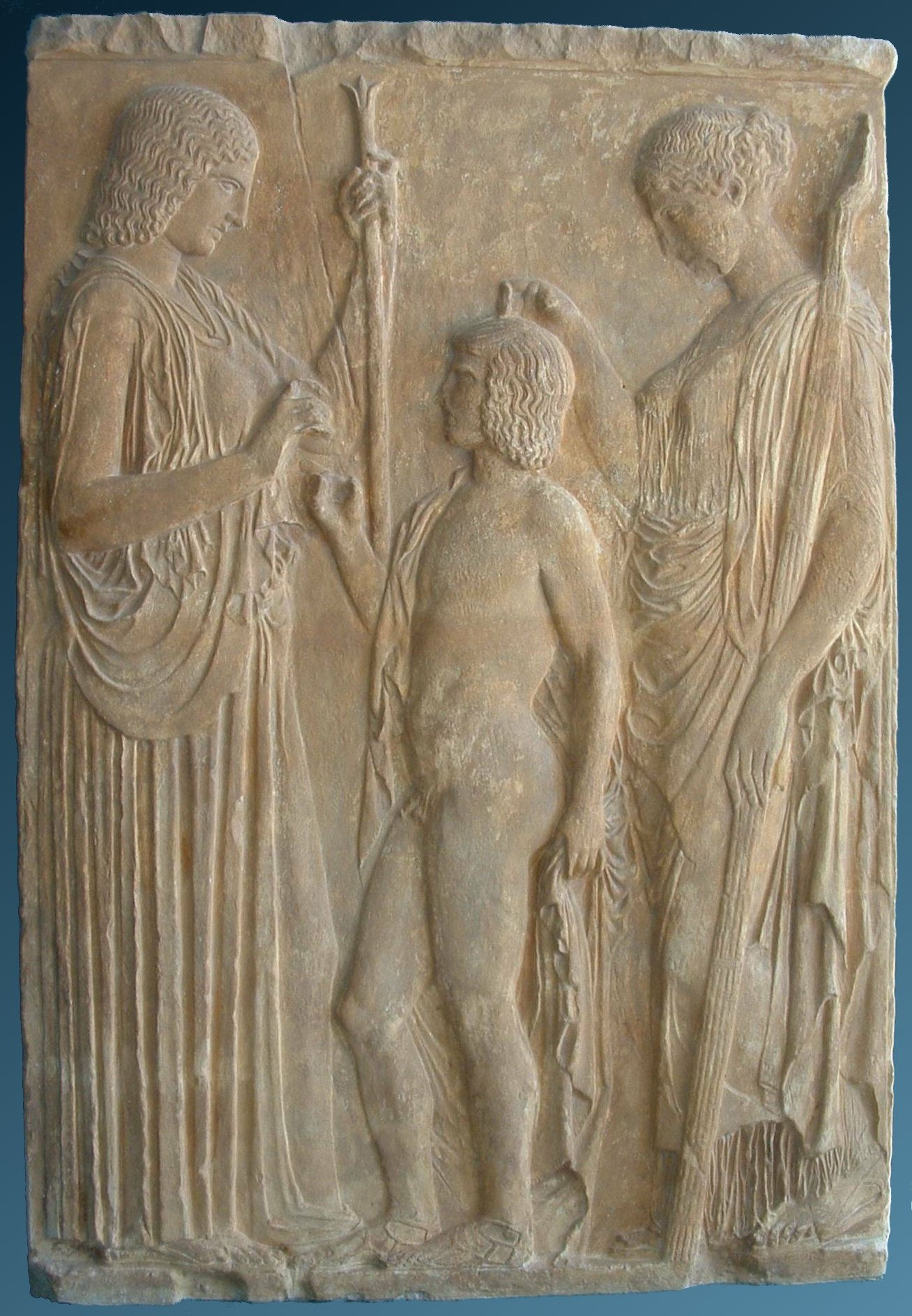
Roman copy in the MET.

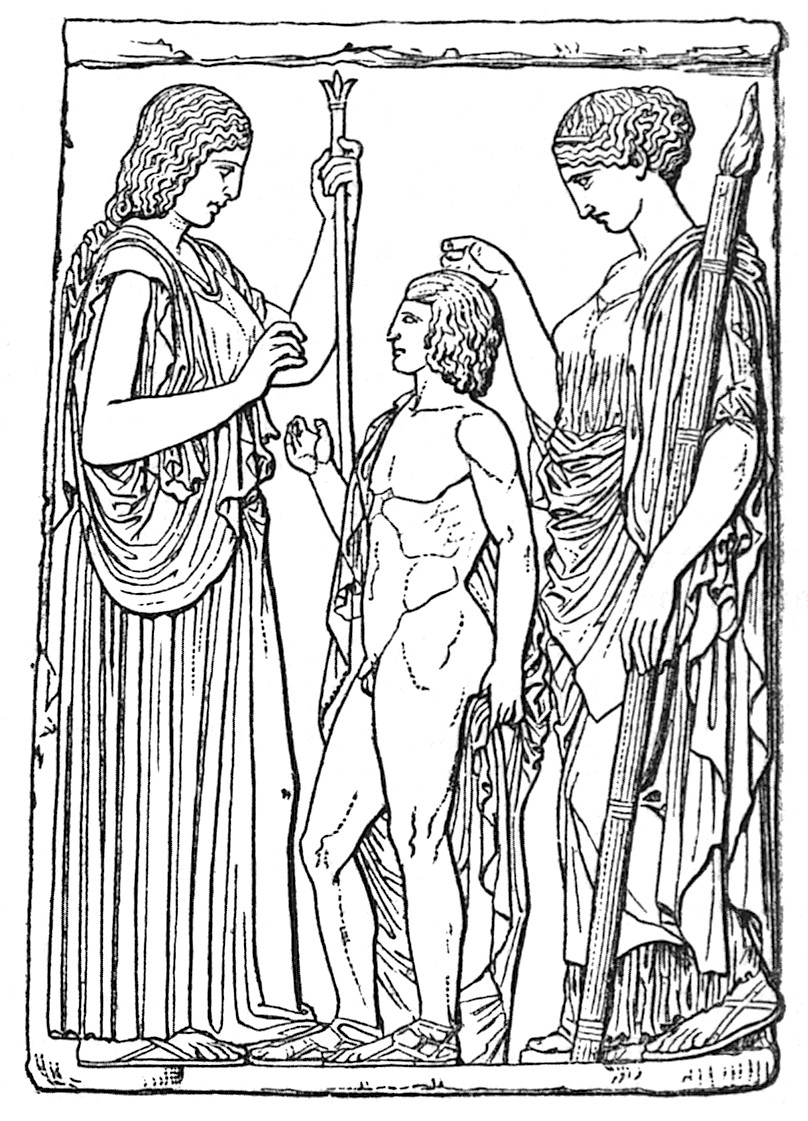
Engraving of the relief.

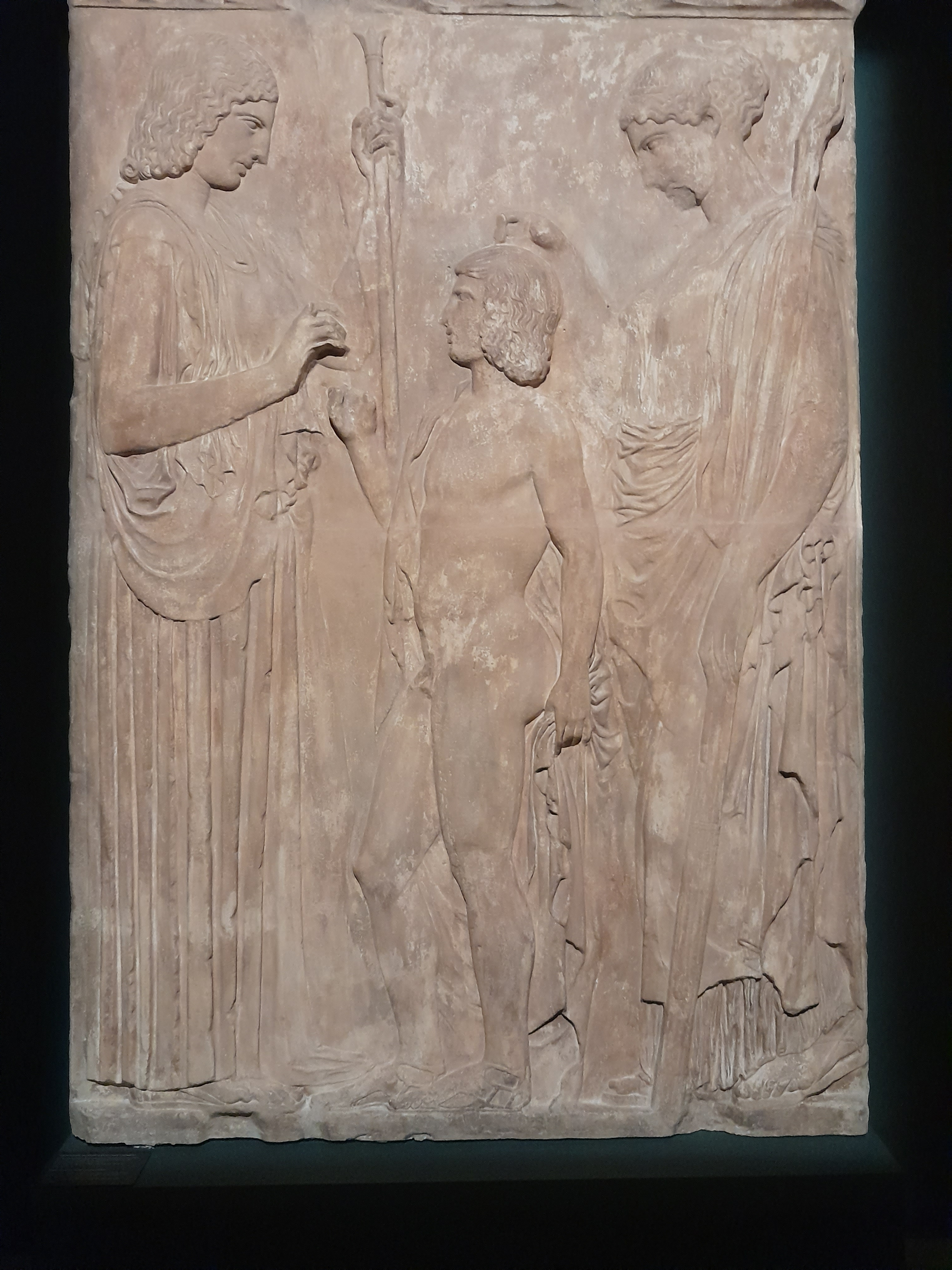
Replica in Eleusis.

== See also ==
- Saint Demetra, Caryatid from Eleusis worshipped as a Christian saint
- Poseidon of Melos
- Diadumenos
- Votive relief to Isis-Demeter, Dion
- Lacrateides Relief, another notable Eleusinian votive relief

== Bibliography ==
- Kavvadias, Panagiotis (1890). Γλυπτά του Εθνικού Μουσείου [Sculptures of the National Museum] (in Greek). Athens, Greece: S. K. Vlastos.
- Kaltsas, Nikolaos (2007). Εθνικό Αρχαιολογικό Μουσείο [National Archaeological Museum] (PDF) (in Greek). Athens, Greece: OLKOS. ISBN 978-960-89339-1-0.
- Papangeli, Kalliope (2002). Ελευσίνα: Ο αρχαιολογικός χώρος και το μουσείο [Eleusis: The archaeological site and the museum] (PDF) (in Greek). Athens, Greece: Latsis Foundation. ISBN 960-86743-2-8.
- Rubensohn, Otto (1899). Mitteilungen des Deutschen Archäologischen Instituts, Athenische Abteilung (in German). Vol. 24. Barth & von Hirst.
