= Votive relief to Isis-Demeter, Dion =

Relief of Isis-Demeter from Dion

Votive relief to Isis-Demeter
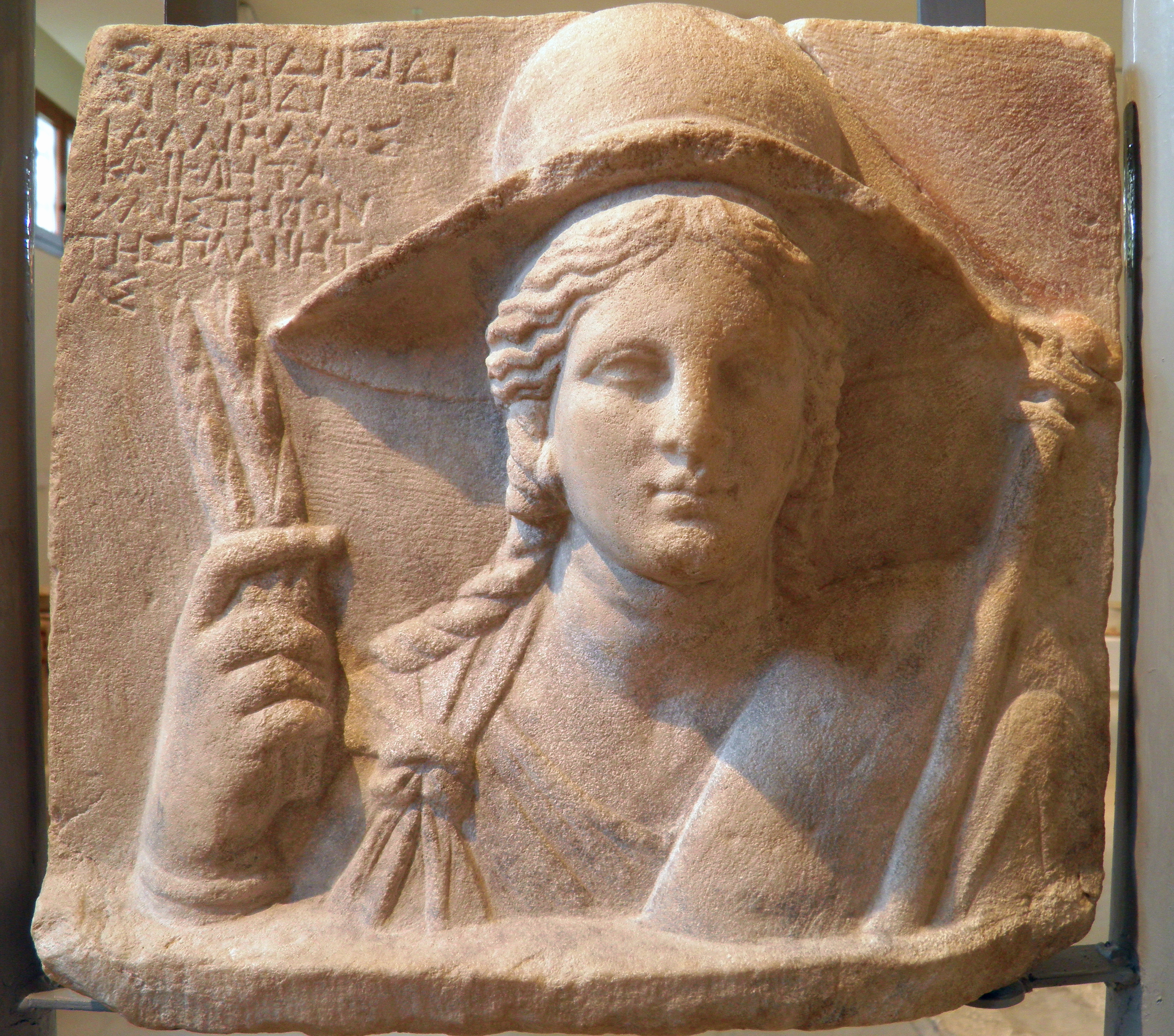
- The relief in the museum of Dion in 2012
- Year: 3rd-2nd century BC
- Catalogue: ΜΔ 410
- Medium: Marble
- Movement: Hellenistic
- Subject: Isis as Demeter
- Dimensions: 31 cm × 34 cm (12 in × 13 in)
- Condition: Intact
- Location: Archaeological Museum of Dion; Dion
- Owner: Greece

The votive relief to Isis-Demeter is a Hellenistic marble sculpture discovered in the archaeological site of Dion in Macedonia, Greece. Made during the late third or early second century BC, it depicts the Egyptian goddess Isis with syncretic features of Demeter, the Greek goddess of agriculture and fertility. It was offered to Isis by a couple as gratitude to the goddess in her temple in Dion. It was discovered in 1973 during excavations, and exhibited in the Archaeological Museum of Dion.

== History ==
The votive relief was created around the end of the third century BC to the beginning of the second century BC, during the Hellenistic period. It was dedicated to the sanctuary of Isis at the ancient Greek city of Dion, northern Greece. The dedicatory inscription on the upper left corner of the marble slab reads:

Σαράπιδι Ἴσιδι Ἀνούβιδι Καλλίμαχος καὶ Κλήτα χαριστήριον τῆς πλανητέας

According to the inscription, a coupled named Callimachus and Cleta offered the relief to the Egyptian divine trinity made up of Isis, Serapis and Anubis as a tribute of their gratitude to the "wandering goddess". It is possible that relief was dedicated to honour profits the couple made thanks to a business deal related to sea voyage. The relief is considered to be an important source for studying and analysing the cults of the deities of the Egyptian pantheon in regards to trade and seafaring.

The relief was excavated in the courtyard, to the northeast of the main temple of Isis Lochia, or Isis the goddess of childbirth, in 1973 during excavatations in Dion carried out by Demetrios Pandermalis and his team. It is now exhibited in the Archaeological Museum of Dion with inventory number ΜΔ 410.

== Description ==
The relief is made of marble, and it has a height of 31 cm, width of 34 cm and depth of 8 cm.

The relief depicts the goddess Isis in profile. She is shown as a goddess of fertility, with features common to depictions of Demeter, the Greek goddess of agriculture. She holds two sheafs of corn on her right hand, and a scepter with a solar disk on her left. She wears a thin, drapery chiton that displays the characteristic "knot of Isis", and she wears a broad-brimmed hat on her head on which a crescent moon or perhaps another symbol of the goddess was once attached. A difficult to distinguish object is located over Isis' left shoulder. The object has been suggested to be a shield or a bag full of seeds.

Her hair is loose ("Isis Lysicomus", meaning Isis of the loose hair), and parted in the middle thus creating rich, wavy grooves on the right and left of her head. Isis' hair then falls freely over the sides of her shoulders, creating spiral locks at various heights. This type of haircut is known as the 'Libyan locks'.

== See also ==
- Great Eleusinian Relief, relief from Eleusis
- Saint Demetra, caryatid mistaken as Demeter
- Interpretatio graeca
- Lacrateides Relief, Eleusinian votive relief

== Bibliography ==
- Pandermalis, Demetrios (2016). Gods and Mortals at Olympus: Ancient Dion, City of Zeus. Greece: Greek Ministry of Culture and Sports. ISBN 978-0-9906142-2-7.
- Basilopoulos, Panagiotes (2020). Tο ανάγλυφο της Ίσιδας στον Δίον [The relief of Isis at Dion] (Thesis) (in Greek). Archived from the original on 2025-08-29.
