= John Marten =

John Marten may refer to:

- J. Thomas Marten (born 1951), United States former district judge
- John Marten Cripps (1780–1853), English traveller and antiquarian
