= Ninnion Tablet =

Clay tablet depicting Greek mysteries

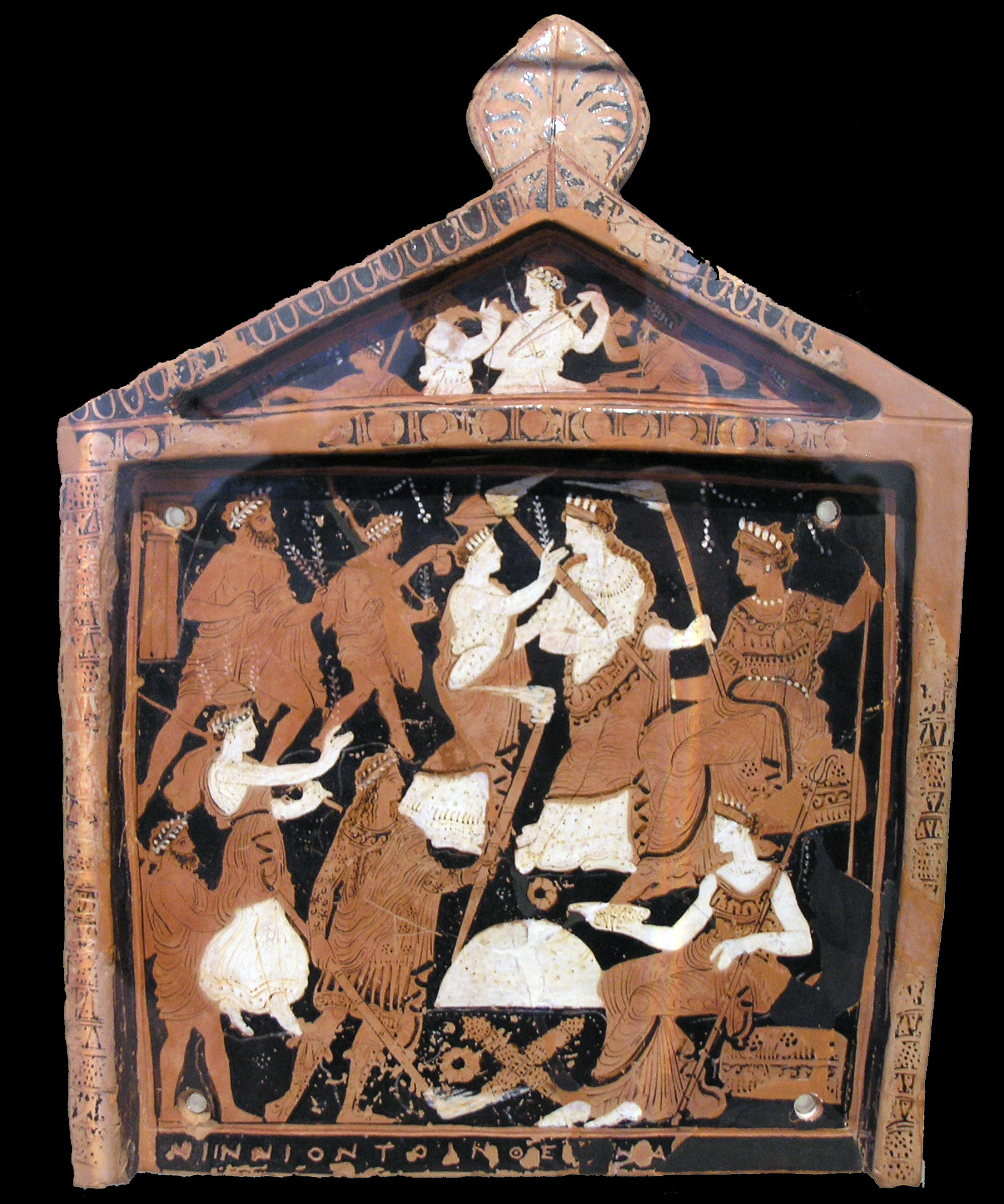
- Material: Clay
- Height: 44.5 cm
- Width: 33 cm
- Created: c. 370 BC
- Discovered: 1895; Elefsina, Attica, Greece
- Present location: Athens, Attica, Greece

The Ninnion Tablet, dated to approximately 370 BC, is a red clay tablet depicting the ancient Greek Eleusinian Mysteries (religious rites connected to Greek mythology). It was rediscovered in Eleusis, Attica in 1895, and is kept in the National Archaeological Museum of Athens.

== Content ==
The tablet depicts Iacchus leading a procession of initiates into the Mysteries. Receiving this group are the deities Demeter and Persephone. Above the artifact's main scene are multiple representations of The Moon. The Ninnion Tablet is the only known original representation of the Mysteries' initiation rites.

== See also ==
- Lacrateides Relief
- Caryatids of Eleusis
- Regina Vasorum
