= Archaeological Museum of Eleusis =

Archaeological museum in Eleusis, Attica, Greece

Coordinates: 38.0407°N 23.5376°E

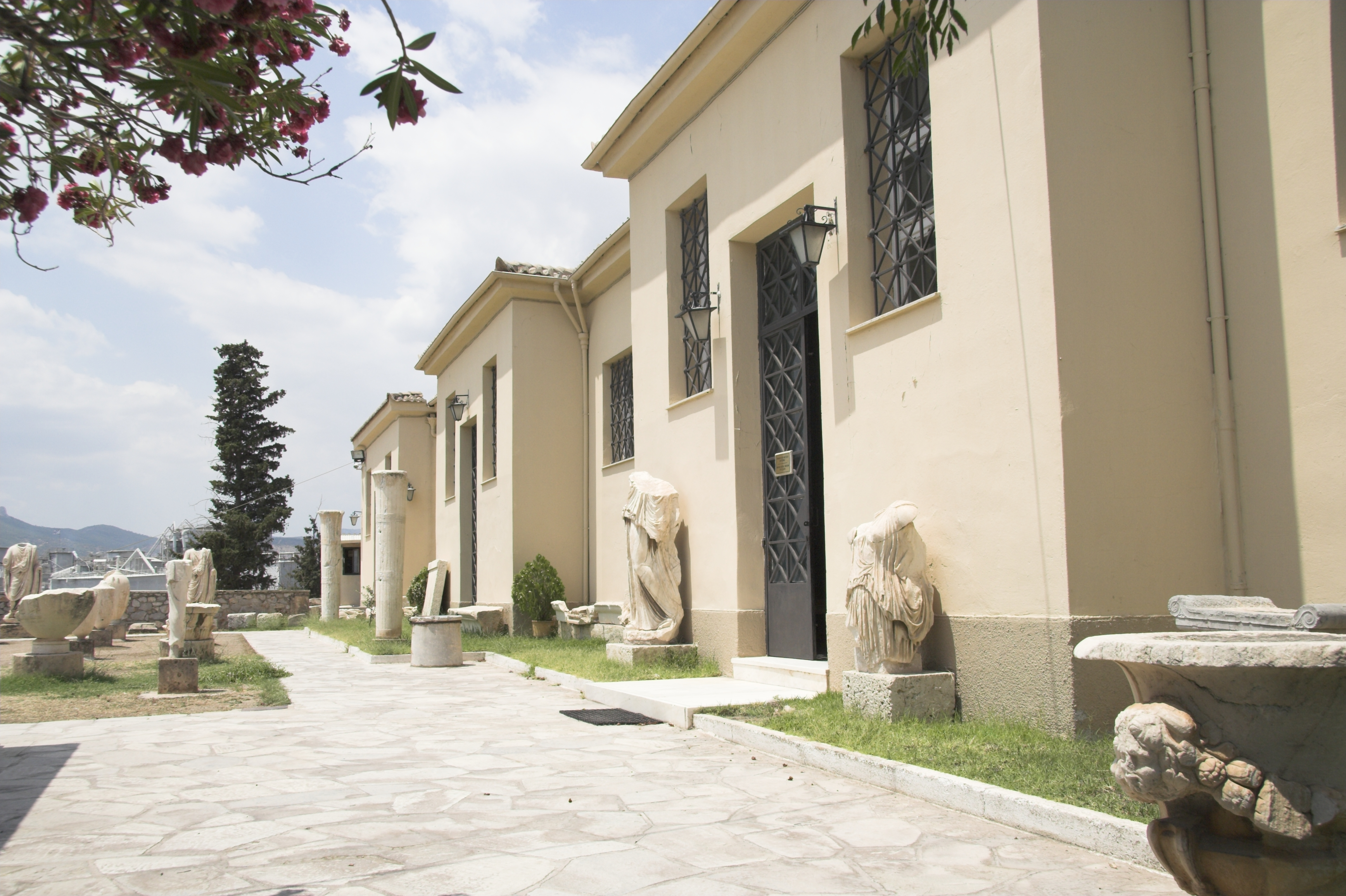
Eleusis Museum

The Archeological Museum of Eleusis is a museum in Eleusis, Attica, Greece. The museum is located inside the archaeological site of Eleusis. Built in 1890, by the plans of the German architect Georg Kawerau, to keep the findings of the excavations, and after two years (1892) was extended under the plans of the Greek architect J. Mousis.

== History ==
The city of Elefsina and the Eleusinian Mysteries are the two main themes of the museum's displays. There is a collection of objects dating from the 5th century BC, when the reputation of the temple was Panhellenic, and the number of believers who moved there in order to attend the ceremonies of the Eleusinian Mysteries had increased significantly.

Many of the findings are associated with these ceremonies. The Votive piglet reminds the sacrifice of these animals for the purgation of the believers at Phaleron, which took place in some of the preparatory stages of the ceremonies, and the kernos, a ceremonial vessel which was used at the sacrifices and at the offerings made to the altars and the temples, during the return of the sacred symbols through the Holy Road from the Ancient Agora back again to the Sanctuary for the final initiation.

Among the most important exhibits of the museum are included: the monumental protoattic amphora from the middle of the 7th century BC, with the depiction of Medusa's beheading by Perseus, the famous "fleeing kore" from the archaic period, that probably comes from the architectural design of the Sacred House, the large headless statue of the goddess Demeter, probably the work of Agorakrito's school - a student of Pheidias-, and the Caryatid from the roof of the small Propylaea, bringing on her head the ciste, the container holding the sacred articles of the ceremony, with a relief appearance of the symbols of the Eleusinian cult, which are: the ear of grain, the poppies, the rosettes and the kernos.

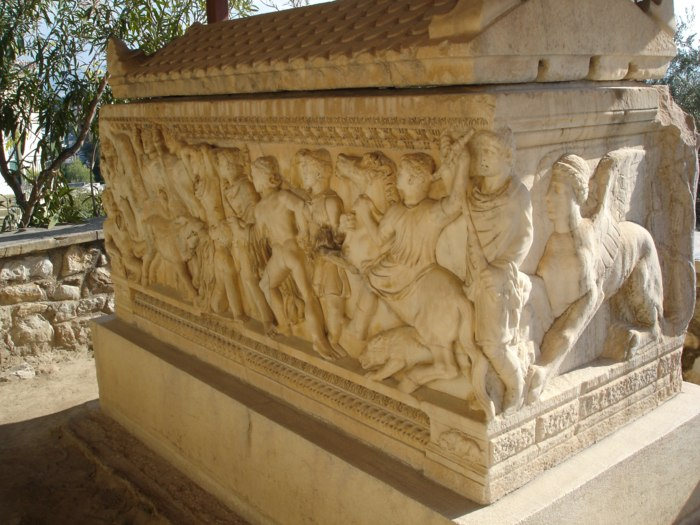
Marble sarcophagus in Eleusis Museum

The two most important findings of Eleusis have been transferred to the National Archaeological Museum of Athens and at the Museum of Eleusis exist only their copies. The first is the relief of the 5th century BC, height 2.20 m, showing Demeter, the Kore and the King of Eleusis Triptolemos, who is preparing to teach agriculture to the world, according to the instructions of the goddess. The second is the clay table known as the Ninnion Tablet with a gable, dedicated by Ninnion, from the 4th century BC, with scenes from the ceremonies at the temple of Demeter, which its significance consists in the information that provides on the strict secret rituals of the Eleusinian mysteries.

In addition, the museum houses a full collection of pottery, dating from Middle Helladic Era (2000 or 1950-1580 BC) to the early Christian times, written tables, metal items, inscriptions and reliefs, including the important votive relief of Rheitoi, with Demeter, the Kore, Athena and an Eleusinian man, which at the bottom has instructions for bridging the lake of Rheitoi (Koumoundourou lake).

In 2023 February, the Museum has reopened to the public following the conclusion of restoration works.

== Gallery ==
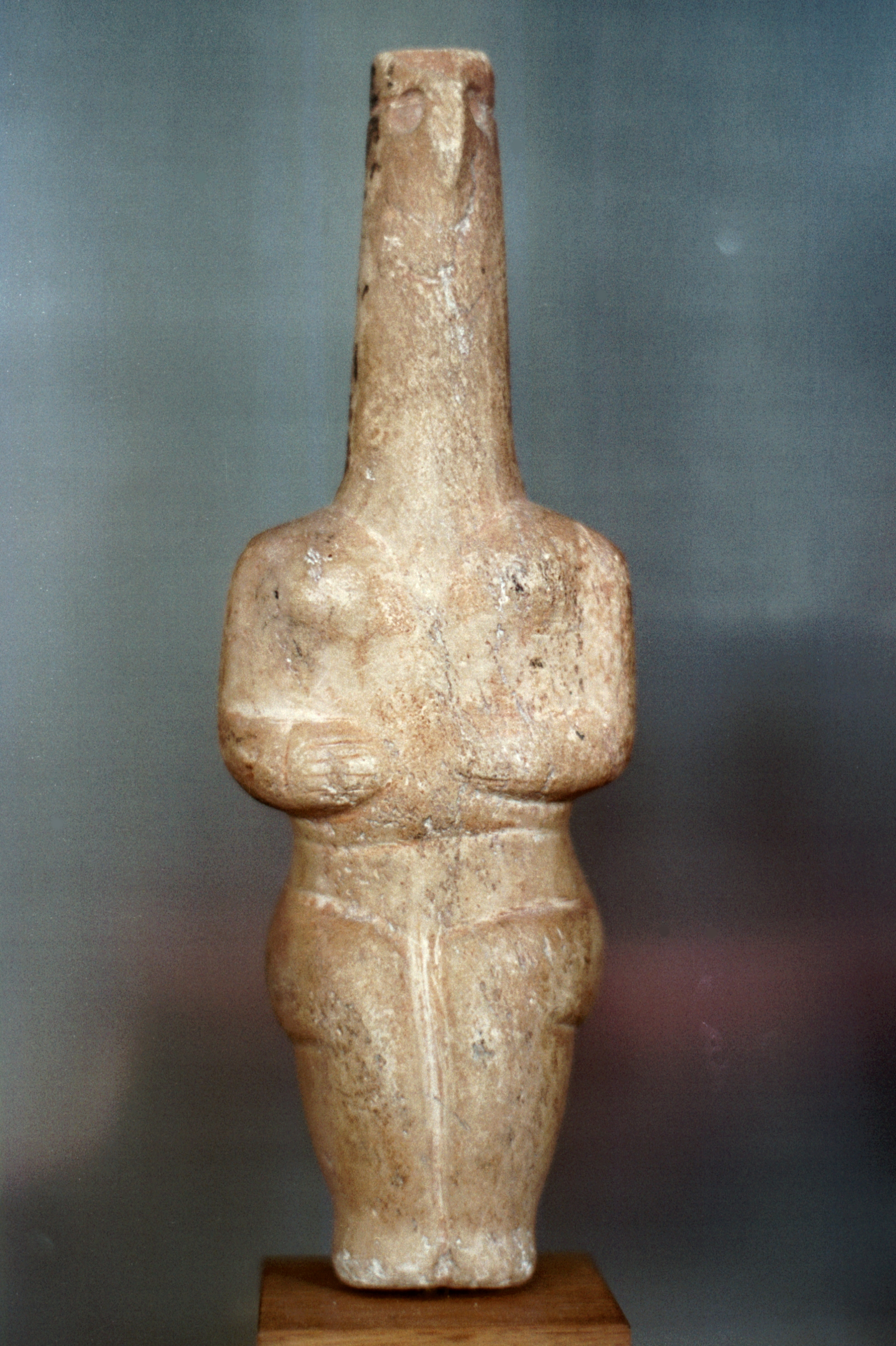

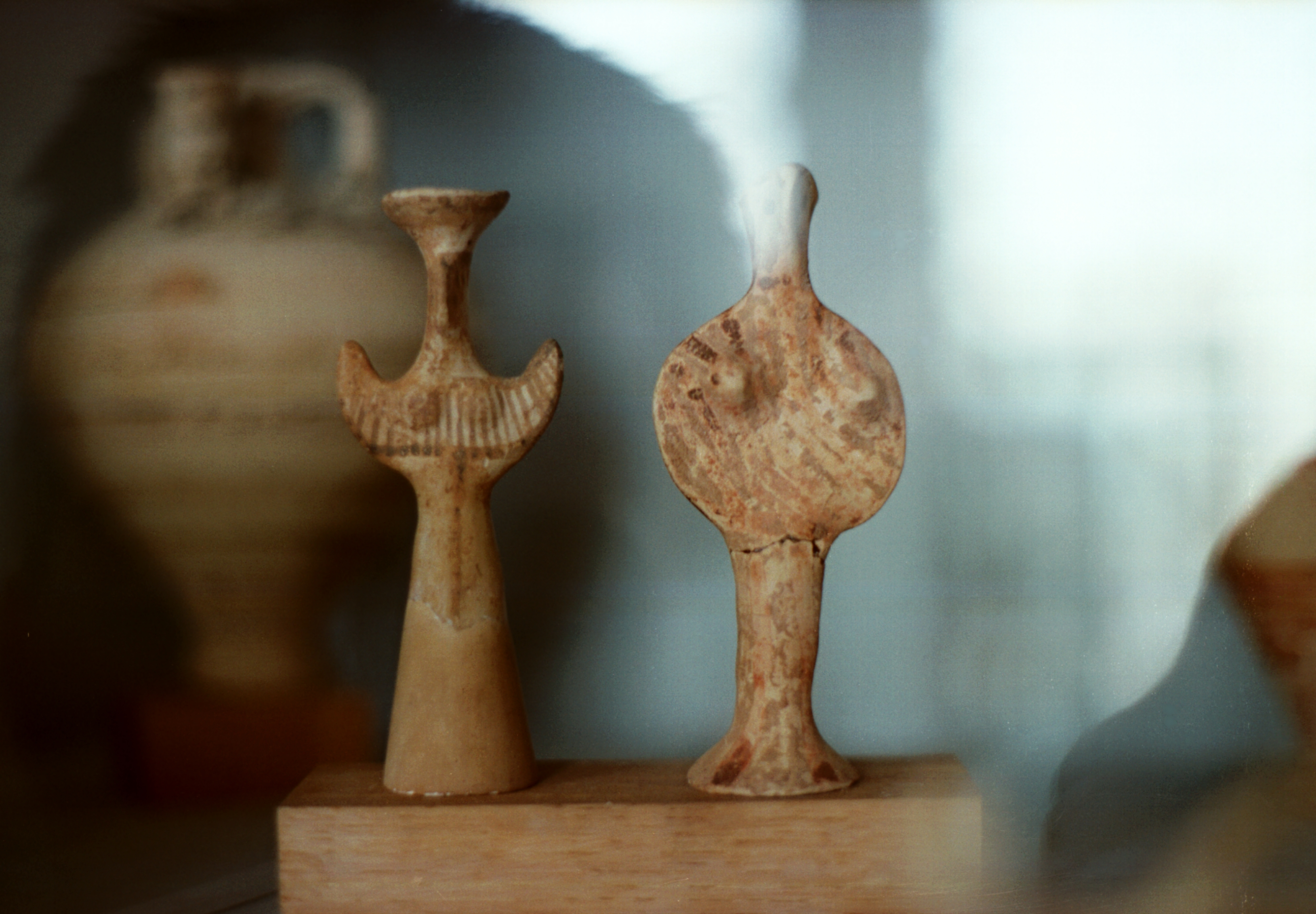

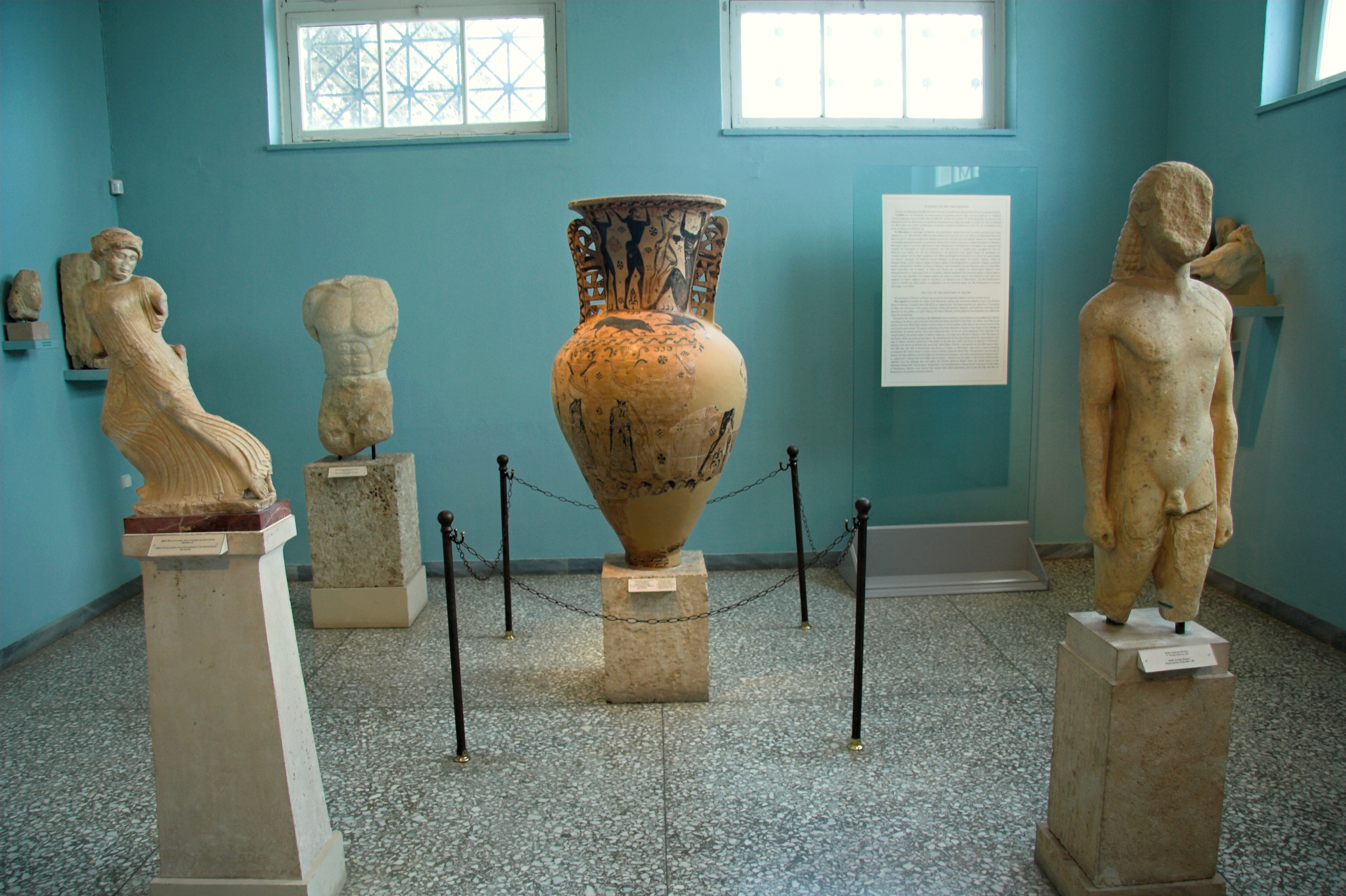

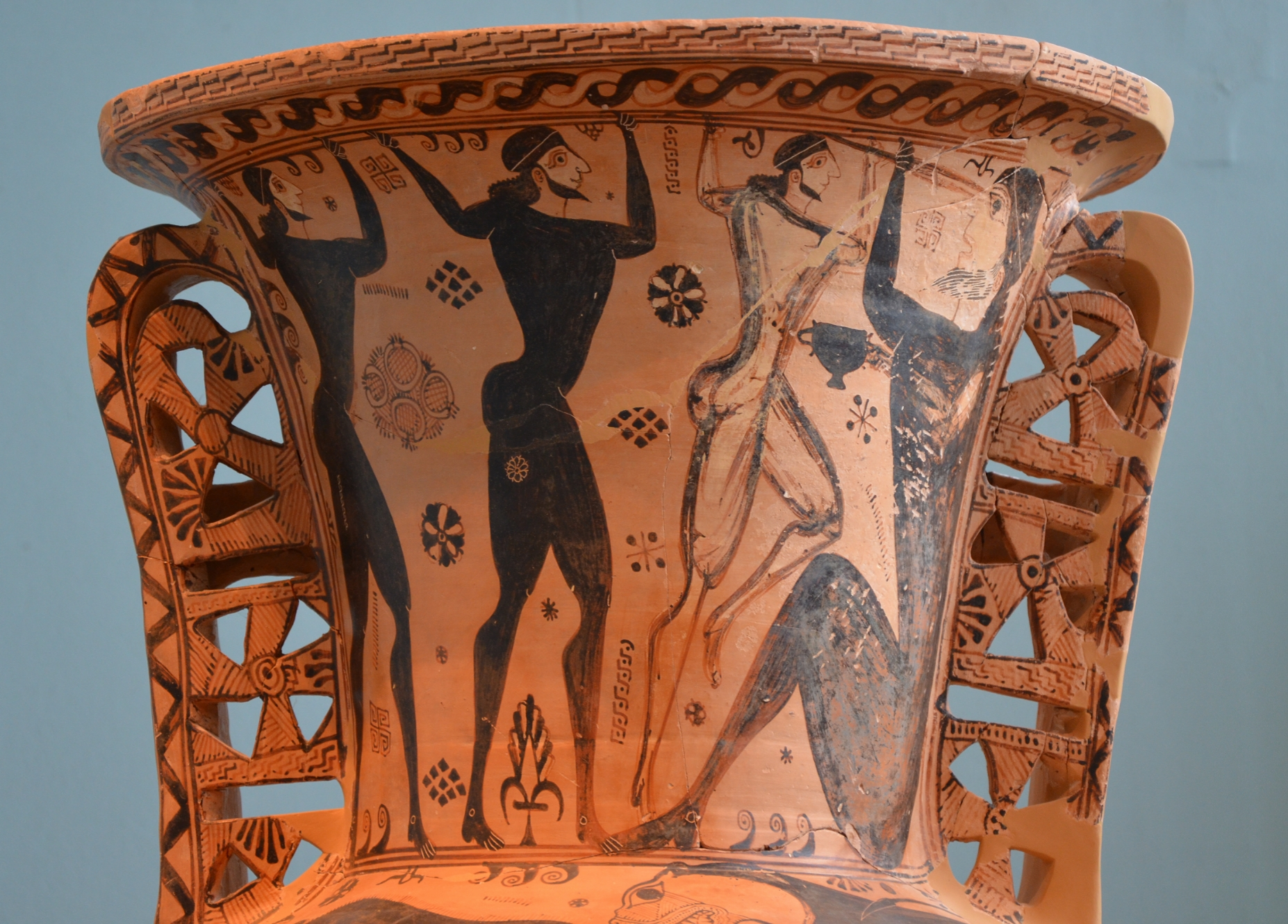
Blinding of Polyphemus

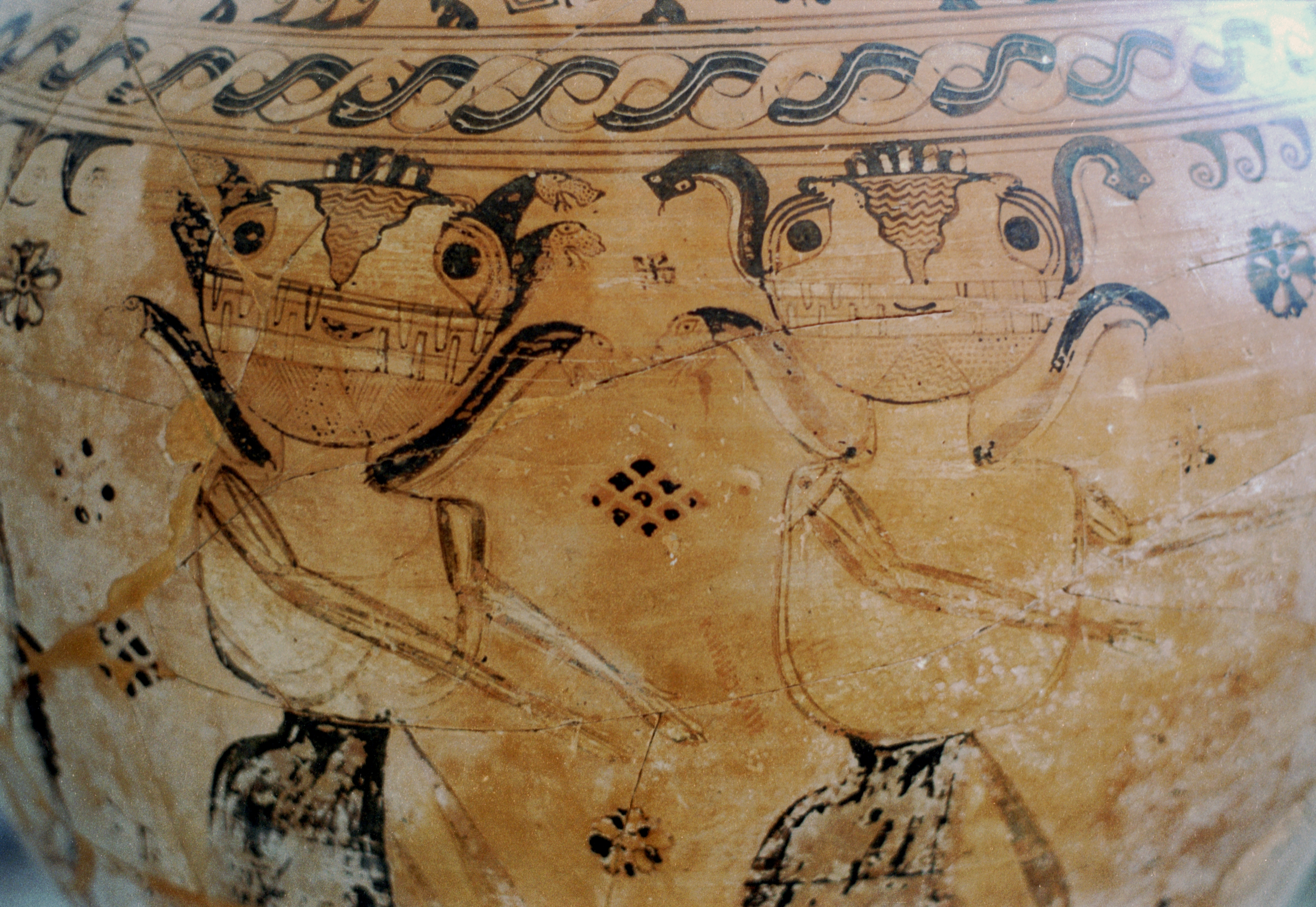

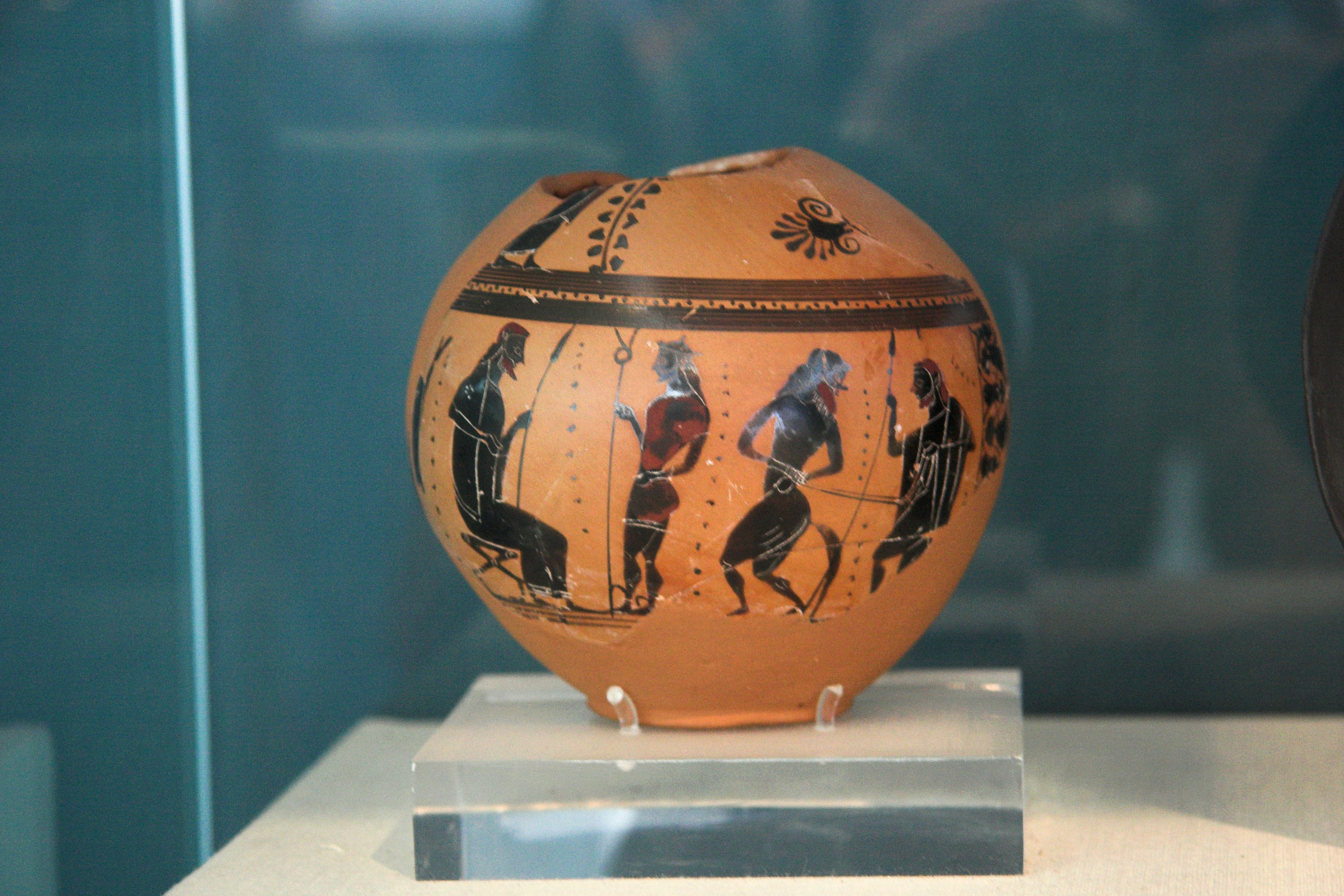

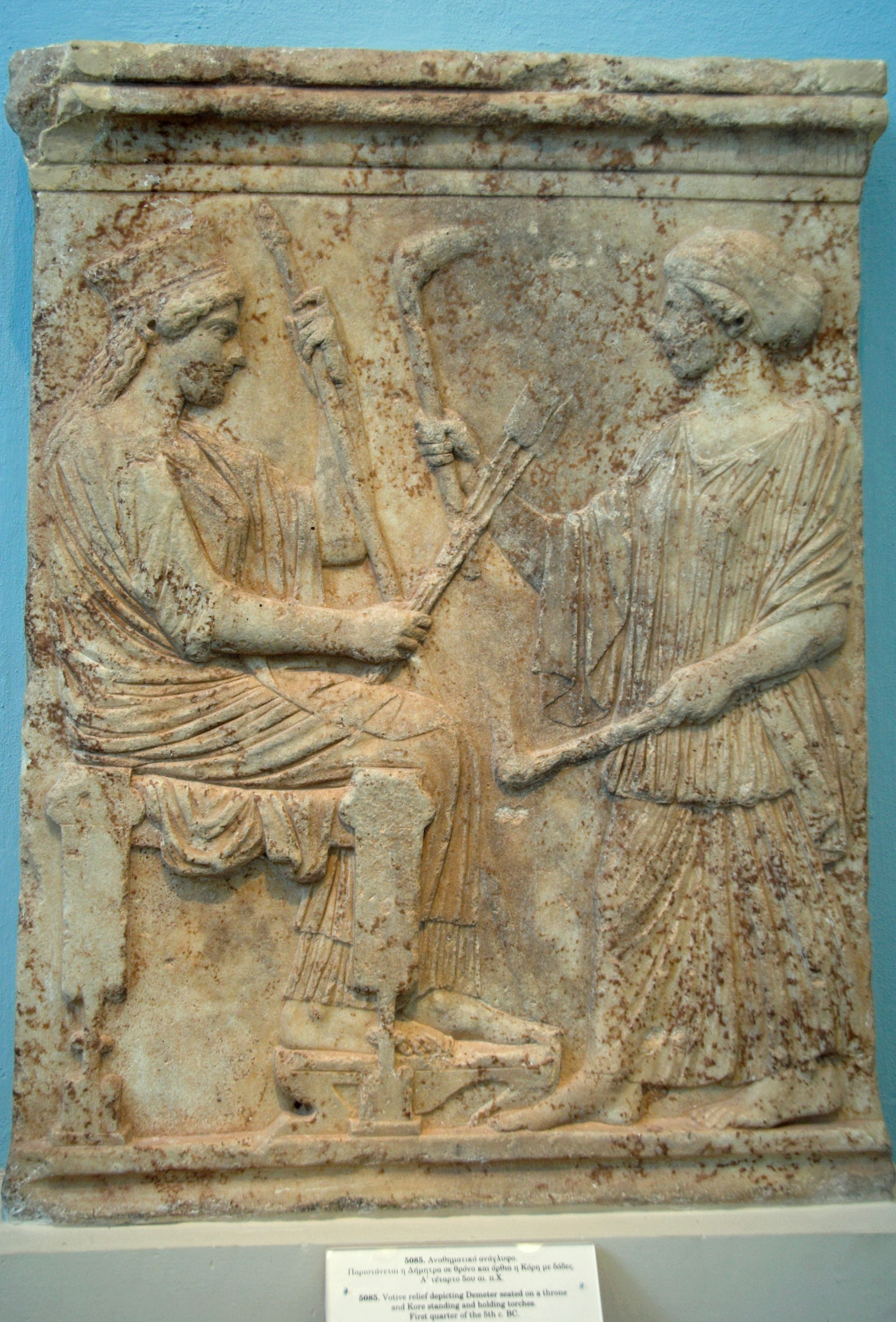
Demeter and Kore

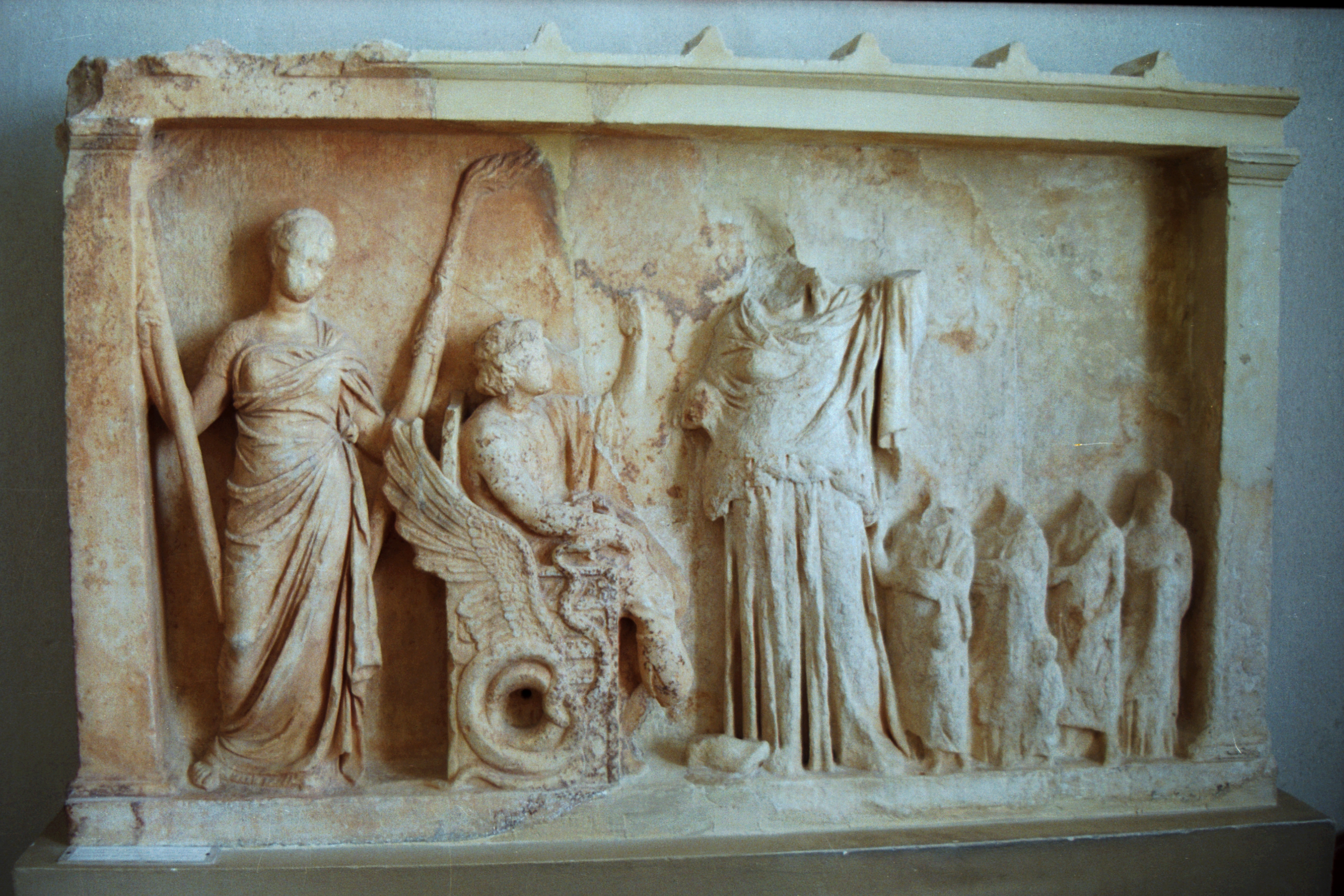
Triptolemus on chariot

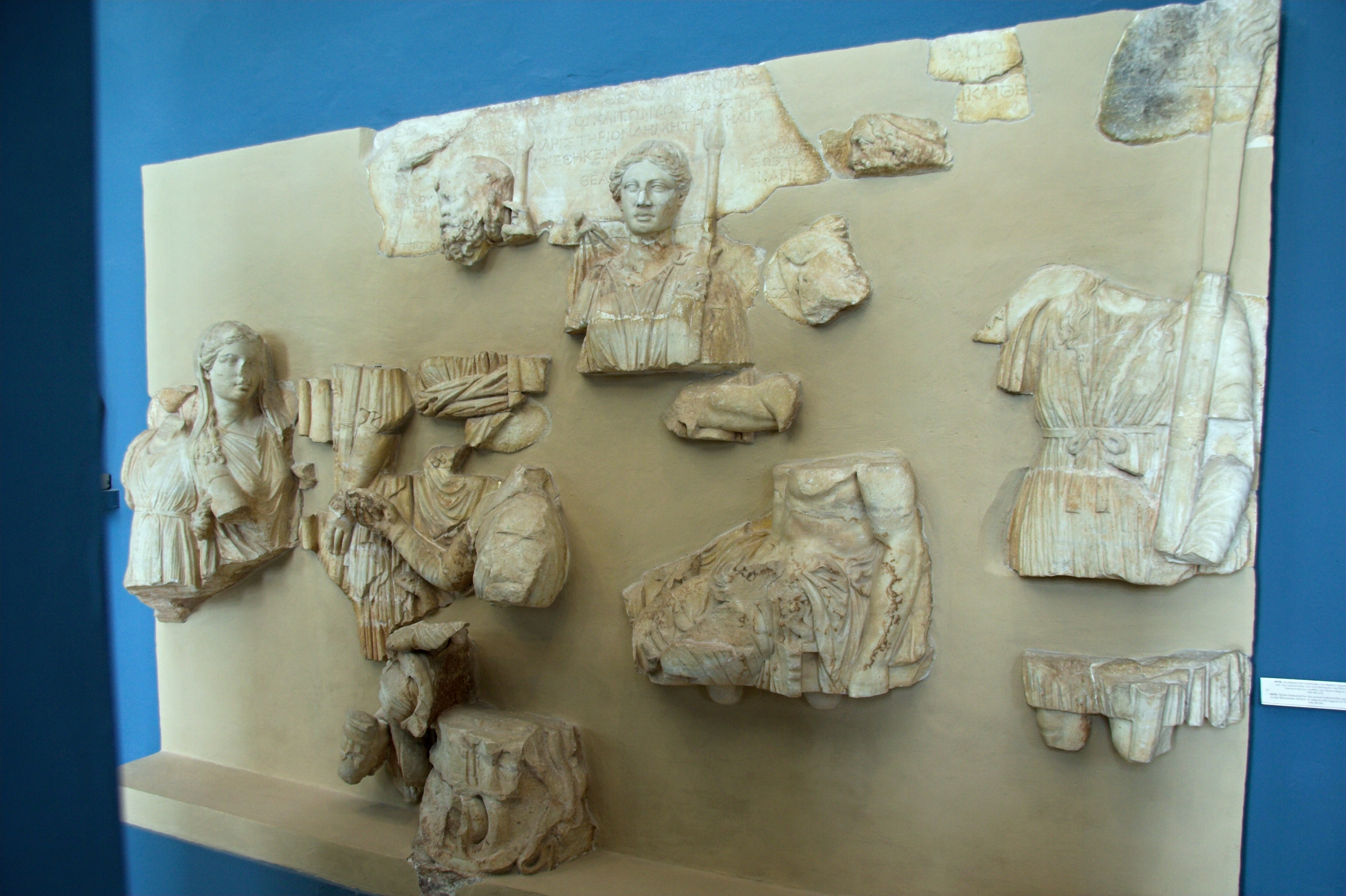
The Lacrateides Relief

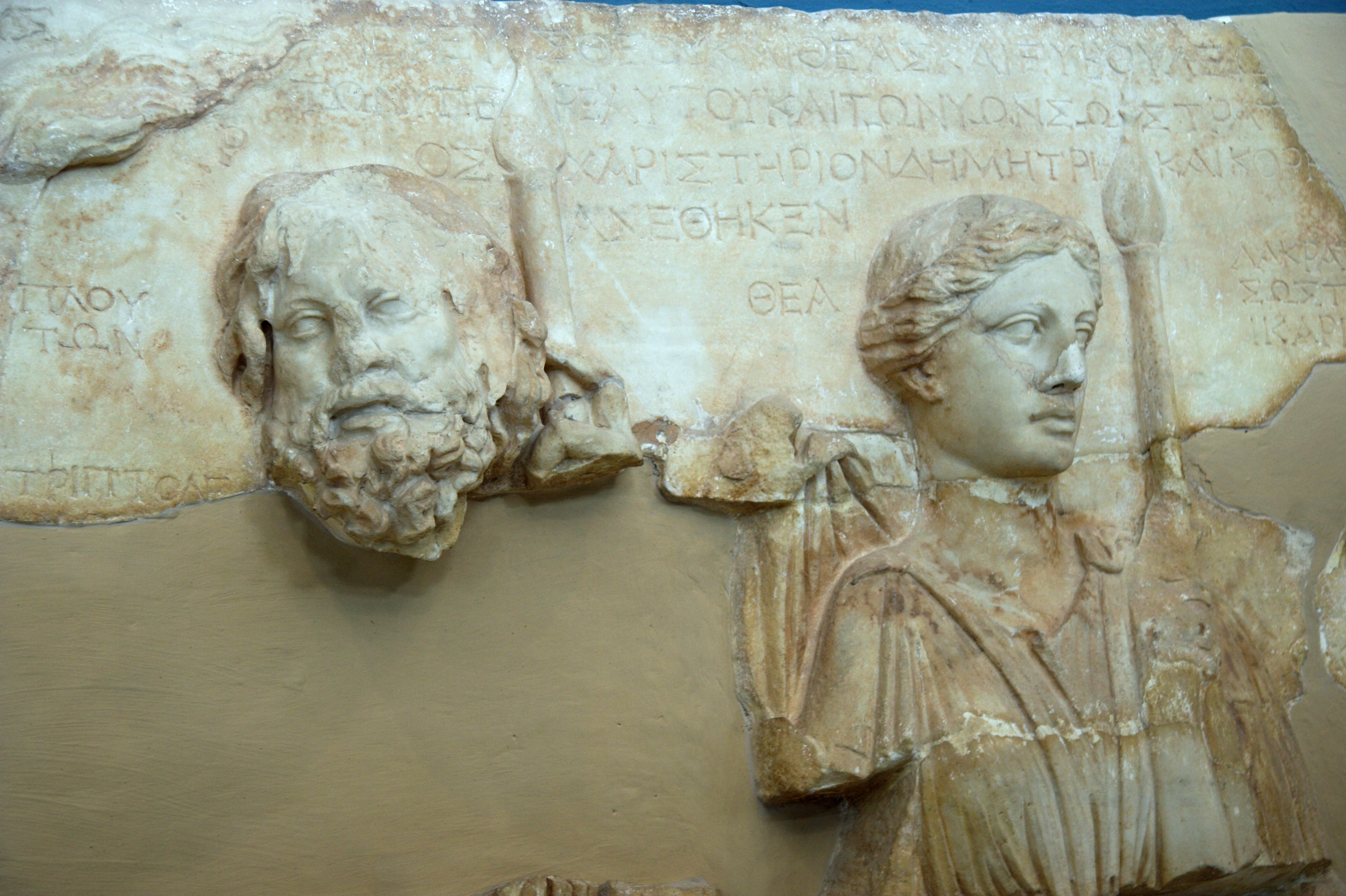
Hades and Persephone relief (detail)

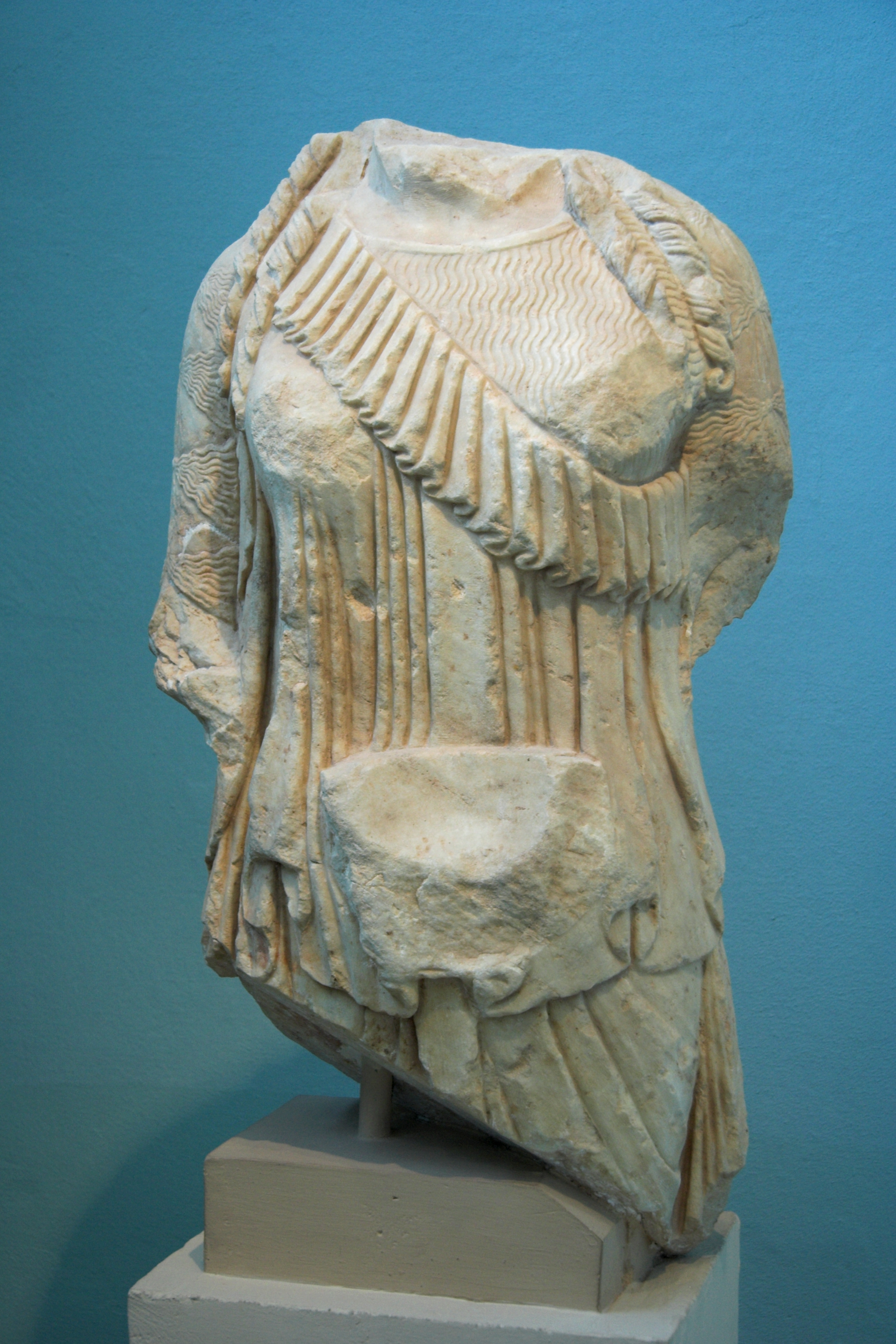

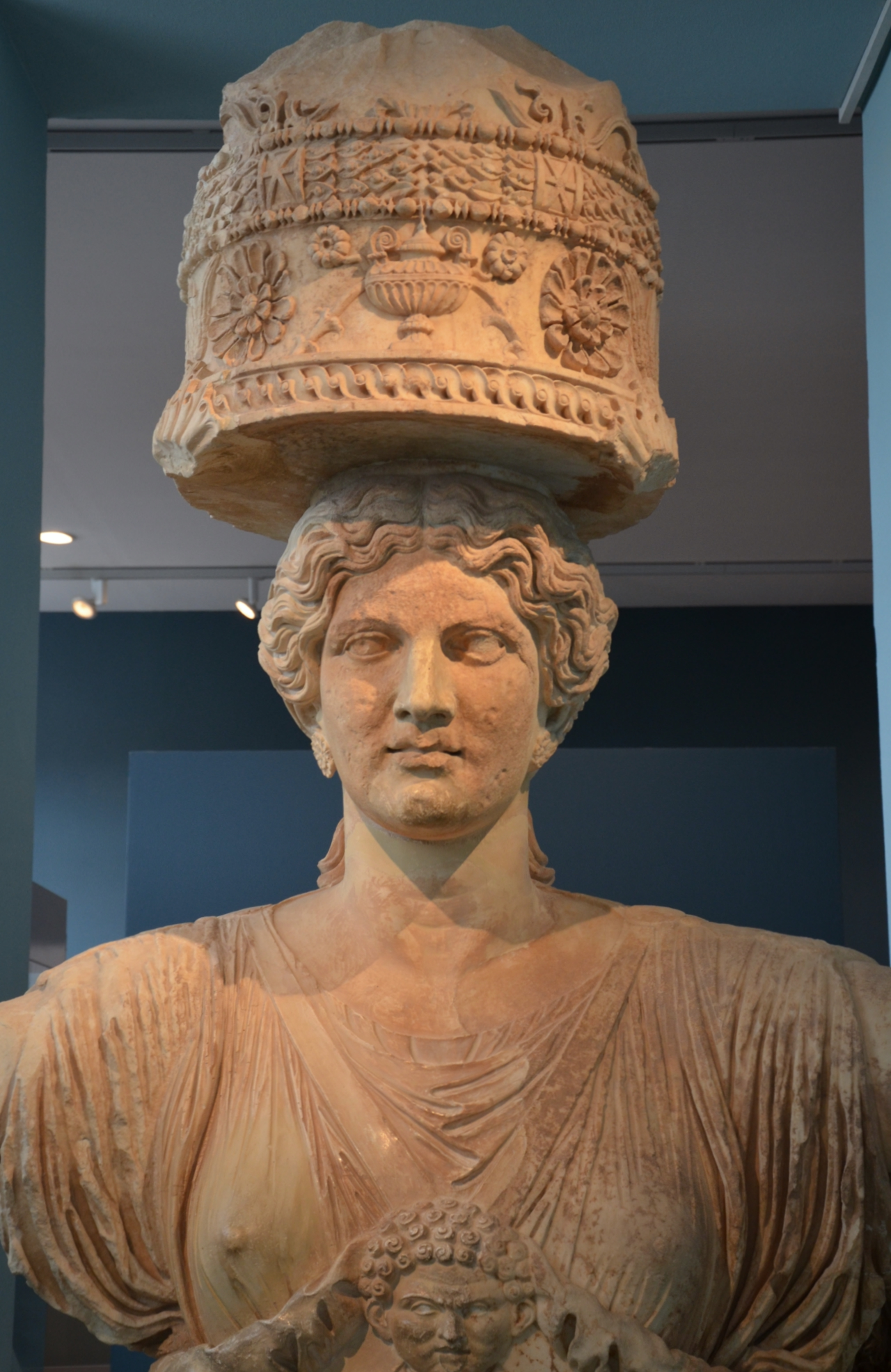
Caryatid from Demeter's sanctuary

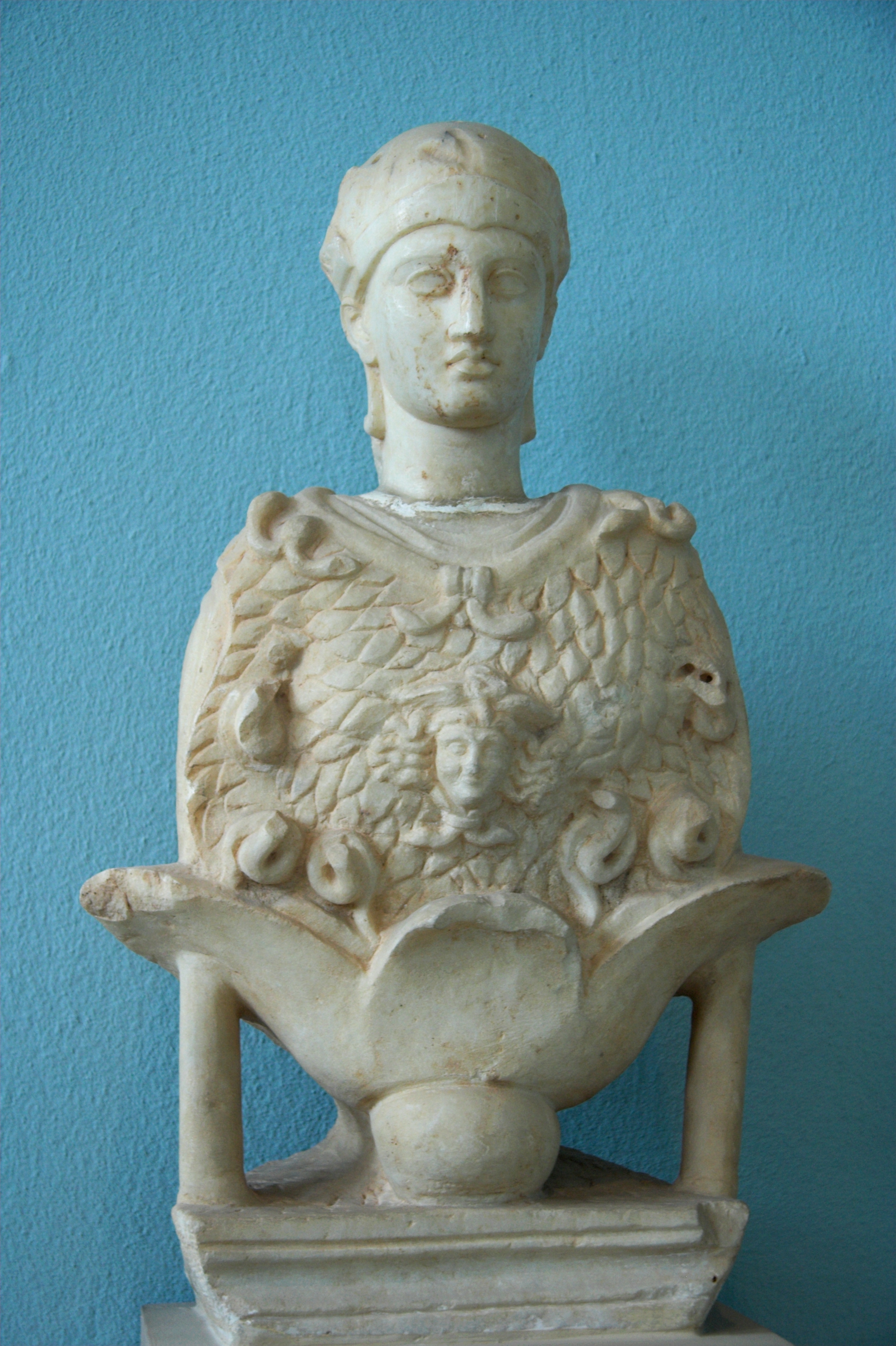
Athena in a flower

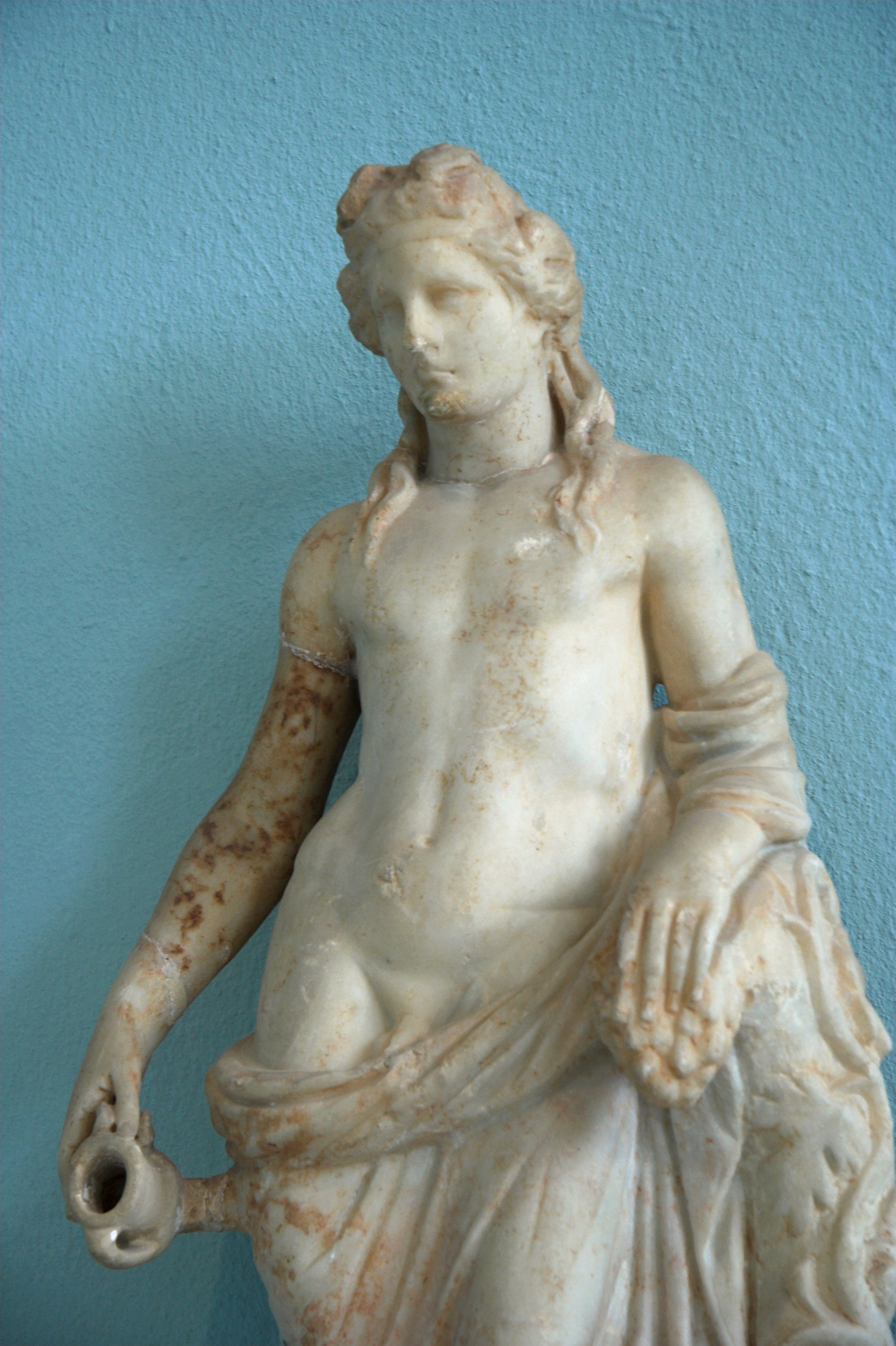
Dionysus statuette

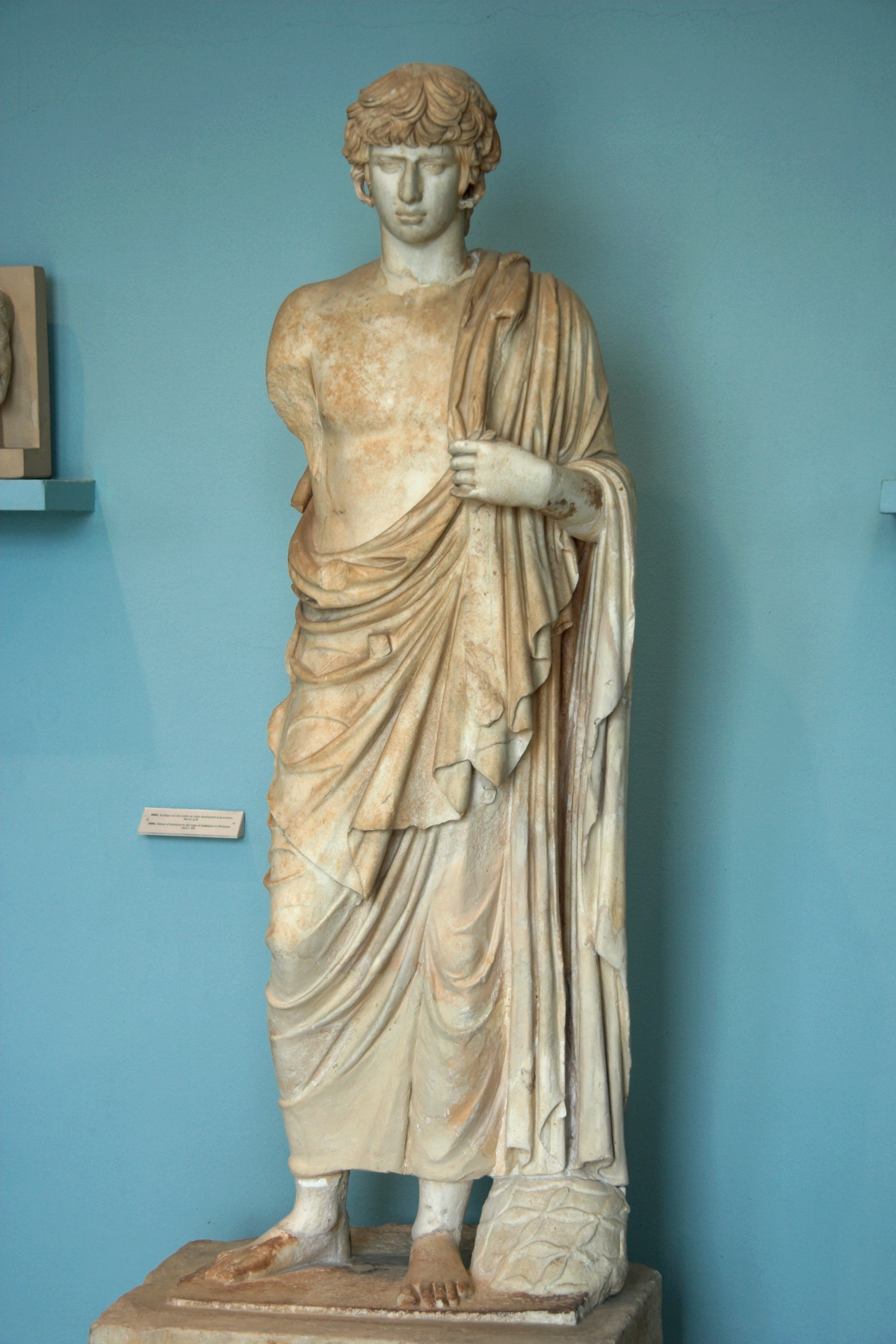
Antinous as Asclepius

== See also ==
- List of museums in Greece
