= Edward Daniel Clarke =

English naturalist, mineralogist and traveller (1769–1822)

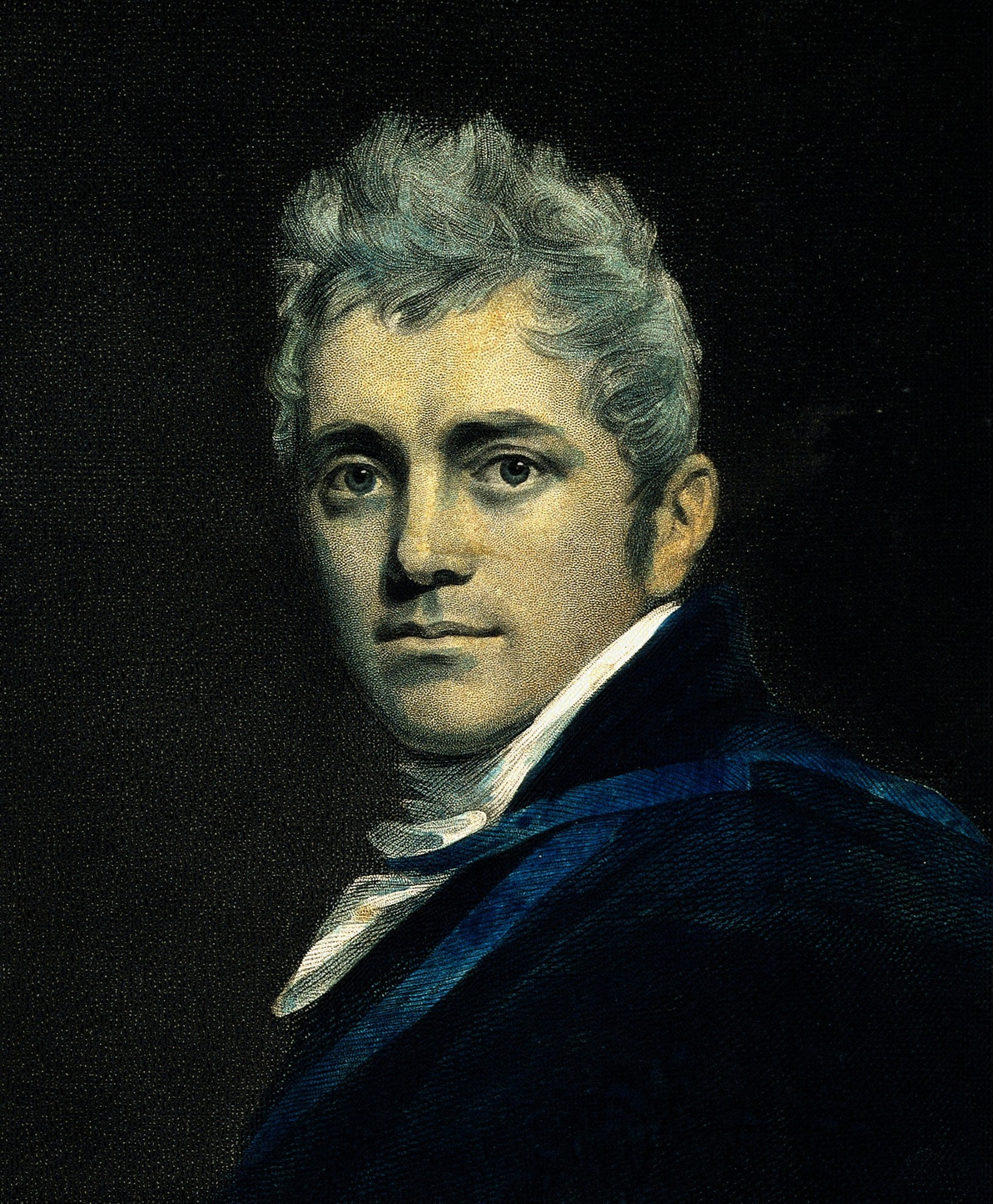
- Born: 5 June 1769; Willingdon, Sussex, England, Great Britain
- Died: 9 March 1822 (aged 52); London, England, United Kingdom
- Scientific career
- Fields: Natural history, mineralogy

Edward Daniel Clarke (5 June 1769 – 9 March 1822) was an English clergyman, naturalist, mineralogist, and traveller.

== Life ==
Edward Daniel Clarke was born at Willingdon, Sussex, and educated first at Uckfield School and then at Tonbridge.

In 1786 he obtained the office of chapel clerk at Jesus College, Cambridge, but the loss of his father at this time involved him in difficulties. In 1790 he took his degree, and soon after became private tutor to Henry Tufton, nephew of the Duke of Dorset. In 1792 he obtained an engagement to travel with Lord Berwick through Germany, Switzerland and Italy. After crossing the Alps, and visiting a few of the principal cities of Italy, including Rome, he went to Naples, where he remained nearly two years. While in Naples, Clarke climbed Vesuvius on numerous occasions, to take guests to the summit and observe the state of activity of the volcano. He also constructed a model of Vesuvius, which Sir William Hamilton declared to be the 'best ever produced'. This model was later transported to Lord Berwick's seat at Attingham Park.

Having returned to England in the summer of 1794, he became a tutor to several distinguished families. In 1799 he set out with John Marten Cripps on a tour through the continent of Europe, beginning with Norway and Sweden, whence they proceeded through the Russian Empire—including Ukraine and Crimea—to Constantinople, Rhodes, and afterwards to Egypt and Palestine. After the capitulation of Alexandria, Clarke helped to secure for England a number of statues, sarcophagi, maps, manuscripts and other antiquities which had been collected by French savants in the city.

Greece was the next country they visited. From Athens, the travellers proceeded by land to Constantinople, and after a short stay in that city directed their course homewards through Rumelia, Austria, Germany and France. Clarke, who had now obtained considerable reputation, took up his residence at Cambridge. He received the degree of LL.D. shortly after his return in 1803, on account of the valuable donations, including a colossal statue of the Eleusinian Ceres, which he had made to the university.

He was also presented to the college living of Harlton, near Cambridge, in 1805. Four years later, his father-in-law added that of Yeldham, Essex. Towards the end of 1808 Clarke was appointed to the newly created Professorship of mineralogy in Cambridge. His perseverance as a traveller and collector was also rewarded financially: the manuscripts which he had collected in the course of his travels, among them the celebrated Clarke Codex of Plato's dialogues (895 CE), were sold to the Bodleian Library for £1000; and by the publication of his travels he realized altogether a clear profit of £6595.

Besides lecturing on mineralogy and discharging his clerical duties, made several discoveries in chemistry, principally by means of the gas blow-pipe, which he had brought to a high degree of perfection. He was also appointed university librarian in 1817, and was one of the founders of the Cambridge Philosophical Society in 1819. He died in London on 9 March 1822.

== Greek artefacts ==
In 1801, Clarke and his assistant John Marten Cripps, obtained an authorisation from the governor of Athens for the removal of a statue of the goddess Demeter at Eleusis, with the intervention of Italian artist Giovanni Battista Lusieri who was Elgin's assistant at the time. The statue had been discovered in 1676 by the traveller George Wheler, and several ambassadors had submitted unsuccessful applications for its removal. Clarke was the one to remove the statue by force, after bribing the waiwode of Athens and obtaining an edict, despite the objections of the local population who unofficially, and against the traditions of the iconoclastic Church, worshipped the statue as the uncanonised Saint Demetra (Greek: Αγία Δήμητρα).

The people would adorn the statue with garlands, and believed that the goddess was able to bring fertility to their fields and that the removal of the statue would cause that benefit to disappear. Clarke also removed other marbles from Greece including a statue of Pan, a figure of Eros, a comic mask and various reliefs and funerary steles. Clarke donated these to the University of Cambridge and in 1803 the statue of Demeter was displayed at the university library. The collection was later moved to the Fitzwilliam Museum in Cambridge where it formed one of the two main collections of the institution.

== Selected works ==
- Testimony of Authors respecting the Colossal Statue of Ceres in the Public Library, Cambridge (8vo, 1801–1803)
- The Tomb of Alexander, a Dissertation on the Sarcophagus brought from Alexandria, and now in the British Museum (4to, 1805)
- A Methodical Distribution of the Mineral Kingdom (fol., Lewes, 1807)
- A Description of the Greek Marbles brought from the Shores of the Euxine, Archipelago and Mediterranean, and deposited in the University Library, Cambridge (8vo, 1809)
- The gas blow-pipe, or art of fusion, by burning the gaseous constituents of water (1819)

Travels in various Countries of Europe, Asia and Africa

(4to, 1810–1819; 2nd ed., 1811–1823; 4th ed., 1817–1824)

- 1816. Part I Vol. I (15 chapters + 2 appendices). Part the first. Russia Tahtary and Turkey. Fourth edition. Volume the first. London, MDCCCXVI. xi + ? + 533 pages.
  1839. Part I (26 chapters + appendices). Travels in Russia, Tartary and Turkey by Edward Daniel Clarke. 140 pages / PIBN 10027007. ISBN 978-1-330-32300-7 (pdf), ISBN 978-0-266-70888-9 (Hardcover) // Forgotten Books
  1848. Part I (26 chapters). Travels in Russia, Tartary and Turkey. 383 pages.
- Part II. Greece, Egypt and Palestyne
- Part III.Travels in Various Countries of Scandinavia Including Denmark, Sweden, Norway, Lapland and Finland (Travels in various Countries of Europe, Asia and Africa. Part The Third, Scandinavia, Section The Second) MDCCCXXIII (1823) / 611 pages. PIBN 10531518, ISBN 978-1-333-65393-4, ISBN 978-0-265-57029-6 (Hardcover) // Forgotten Books

== Family ==
In 1806, Clarke married Angelica, fifth daughter of Sir William Beaumaris Rush. She was the younger sister of Charlotte Rush, whom John Marten Cripps had married on 1 January 1806.

== See also ==
- Timeline of hydrogen technologies
