= John Marten Cripps =

English traveller and antiquarian (1780–1853)

John Marten Cripps (1780–1853) was an English traveller and antiquarian, a significant collector on a Grand Tour he made during the French Revolutionary Wars.

== Life ==
The son of John Cripps of Sussex, he entered Jesus College, Cambridge as a fellow-commoner, on 27 April 1798, and came under the tuition of Edward Daniel Clarke. After a period at Cambridge, he set out on a tour with his tutor. Clarke's lengthy work Travels relates this journey. Cripps had become a landowner of independent wealth under the 1797 will of his uncle John Marten.

The tour, intended to be for a few months, lasted three and a half years. On the initial part of their journey, to Norway and Sweden, they were accompanied by William Otter and Thomas Robert Malthus, both members of Jesus College. From Scandinavia they travelled south through Russia. They then visited Jerusalem, Egypt, and Greece. They made their way back to England during the Peace of Amiens. Cripps brought back large collections of statues, antiques, and flora: some of which he presented over time to the University of Cambridge and other institutions.

In 1803 Cripps was created M.A. per literas regias, and also became a Fellow of the Linnean Society. He became a Fellow of the Society of Antiquaries of London, in 1805.

== Landowner and horticulturist ==
By will dated 1 Octocter 1797, Cripps inherited the property of his maternal uncle, John Marten, which included possessions in the parish of Chiltington, with the manor of Stantons, Sussex. Having built Novington Lodge on the Stantons estate, Cripps resided there, and devoted time to horticulture, particularly varieties of apples and other fruits. From Russia he introduced the kohlrabi.

== Death and legacy ==
Cripps died at Novington on 3 January 1853, in his seventy-third year.

Cripps had bought the herbarium of Peter Simon Pallas on his journey, when he and Clarke had stayed with Pallas in the Crimea, Clarke being ill. He sold it at auction in 1808, where it went to Aylmer Bourke Lambert.

The bramble species Rubus crippsii, named by Edward Daniel Clarke in his honour and illustrated in his Travels, is now known as Rubus sanctus.

The Codex Crippsianus, from the 14th century, is now in the British Library. Cripps had acquired it from Vatopedi on Mount Athos. It has been described by Nigel Guy Wilson as "the most important source for the text of several Attic orators".

== Family ==
Cripps married on 1 January 1806 Charlotte Rush, third daughter of Sir William Beaumaris Rush of Wimbledon, and left children. The following year Clarke married the fifth daughter, Angelica.

== See also ==
- Caryatids of Eleusis
