= Lacrateides Relief =

Hellenistic votive relief from Eleusis

Lacrateides’ Votive Relief
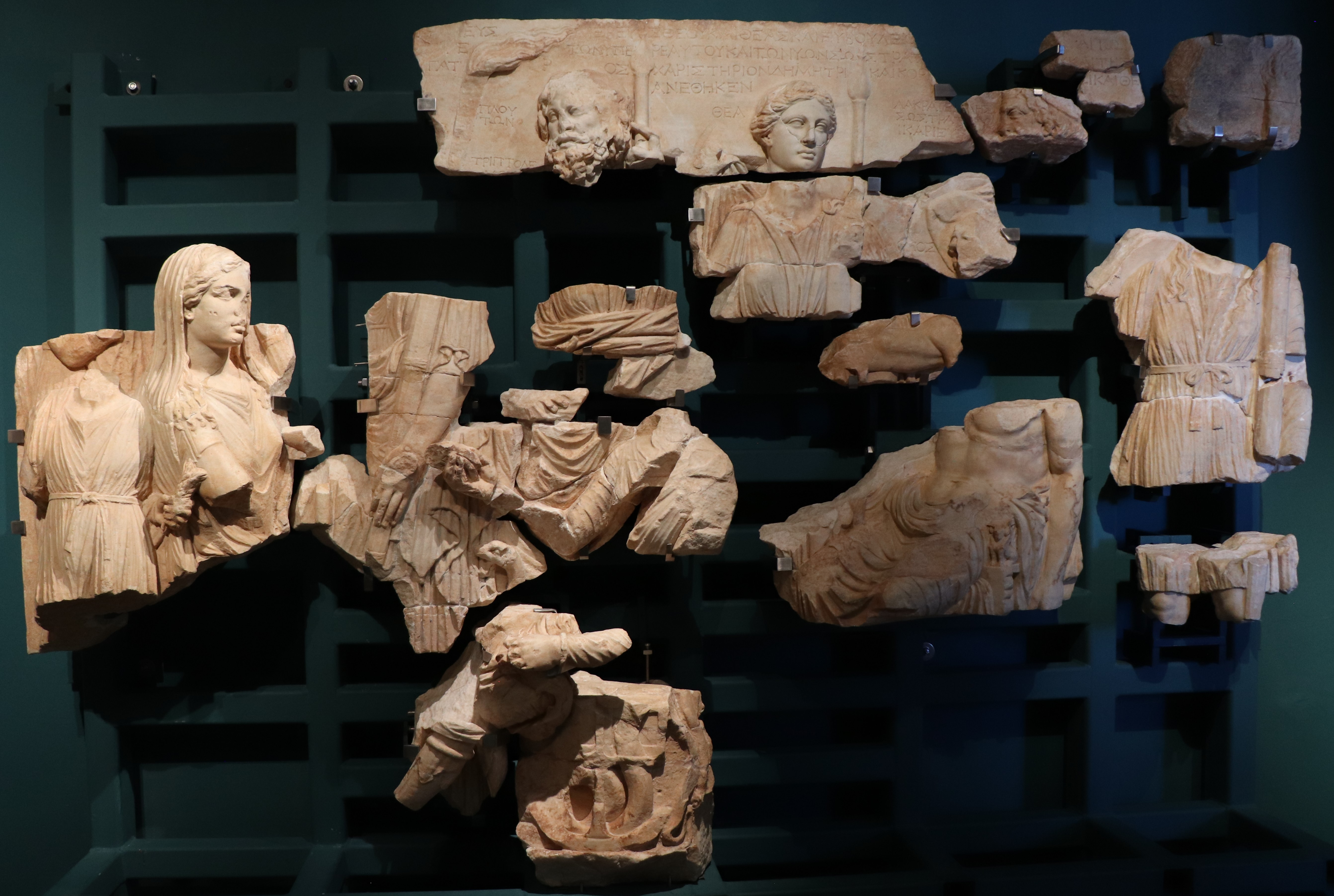
- The relief in the museum in 2022
- Year: Late 2nd century BC
- Catalogue: no. 5079
- Type: Votive relief
- Medium: Marble
- Movement: Hellenistic
- Subject: Eleusinian deities and heroes
- Dimensions: 150 cm × 250 cm (59 in × 98 in)
- Condition: Fragmentary, about half missing
- Location: Archaeological Museum of Eleusis; Eleusis
- Owner: Greek state

The Lacrateides Relief (Greek: Ανάγλυφο του Λακρατείδη) is a large ancient Greek marble votive relief of the late Hellenistic age (second century BC) dedicated by the priest Lacrateides to the Eleusinian deities in the Sanctuary of Pluto in Eleusis. It depicts the most significant figures of the Eleusinian pantheon such as the goddess of agriculture Demeter, her daughter Persephone, the hero Triptolemus and Pluto (Hades), the god of wealth. The votive relief was found in late nineteenth century in multiple fragments, while many are still missing. The preserved portion is exhibited in the Archaeological Museum of Eleusis, in southern Greece.

== History ==
Lacrateides served as priest to gods such as Theos, Thea and Eubuleus, and an inscription on the relief states that he dedicated the work to deities of the Eleusinian pantheon. The work dates to c. 100–90 BC, and is the earliest known artefact that depicts Eubuleus with certainty.

The numerous fragments were located in 1885 in the area of the Plutonium (the sanctuary of Pluto) by D. Philios, and published the following year. The relief was reconstructed and repaired, and then placed in the Archaeological Museum of Eleusis with inventory number 5079. Despite the poor condition the large relief is in, it was described by Konstantinos Kourouniotis in 1936 as being a very important finding on account of both its size and historical value for understanding the cult in Eleusis.

== Condition ==
The votive relief is preserved in a highly fragmented condition, with many portions missing; the surviving fragments, which number about sixty, account for about only half of the original piece. The original dimensions of the relief are estimated to have been around 2,5 to 3 meters in length, 1,50 to 1,80 cm in height, and it weighs more than six tonnes. The discrepancy in the estimates of the dimensions is due to a hypothesis, mostly not accepted, that the relief might had been larger than estimated on the right, the more fragmentary side of the two. If true, then the relief originally depicted eleven figures rather than the accepted ten; the eleventh figure would have likely been Dionysia, the wife of Lacrateides, as her name appears in the inscription.

== Scene ==
=== Mission of Triptolemus ===
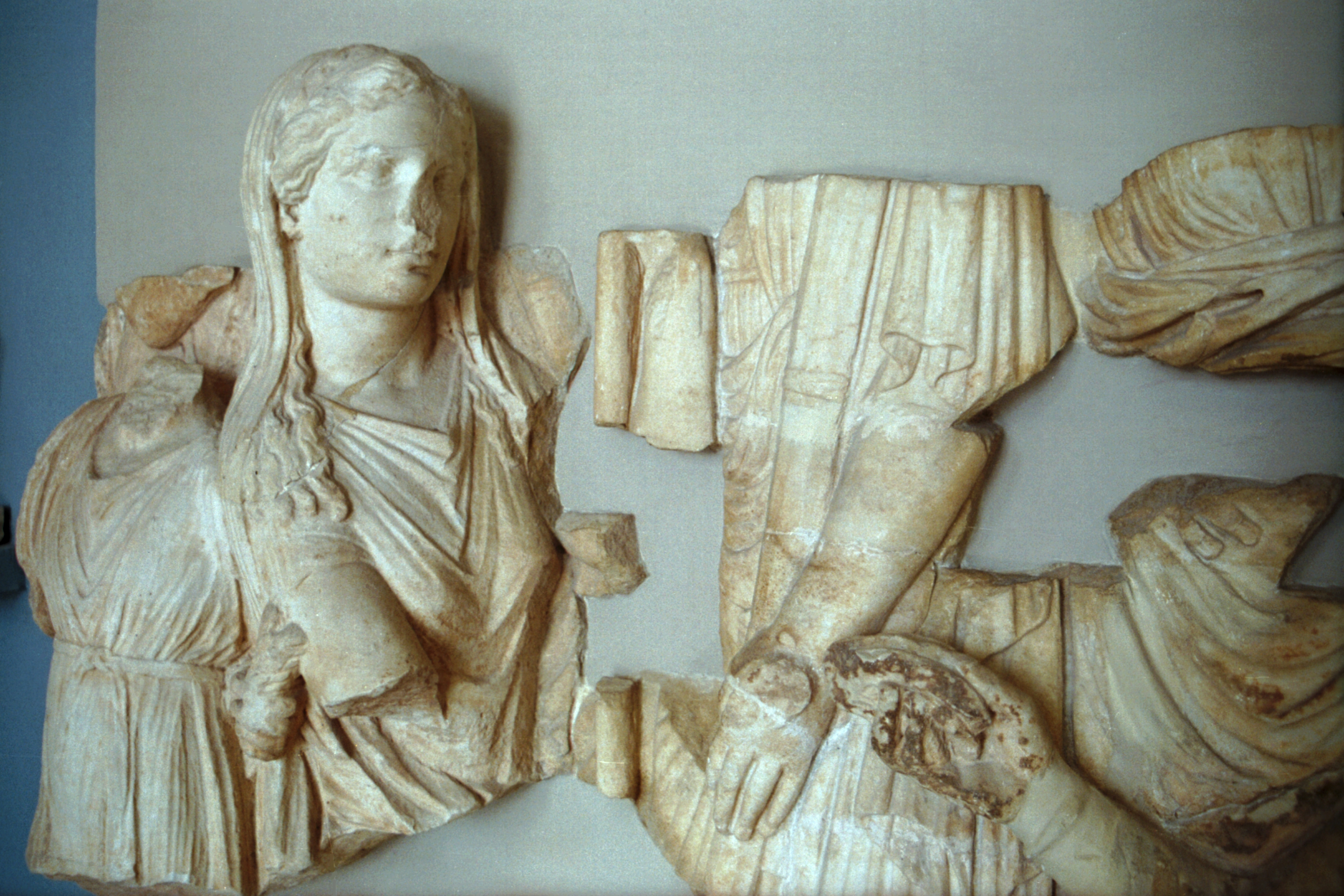
Demeter, Kore and Triptolemus detail.

On the far left two fragmentary figures can be seen, a female and a male one. Both are holding myrtle twigs or alternatively wheat in their hands. They are traditionally identified as a personification of Eleusis and Plutus, Demeter's son and god of wealth. Plutus wears the garments of an initiate, and his presence (Wealth) next to Demeter (Agriculture) is symbolic. Eleusis has sometimes been identified with Hecate, another goddess related to the Eleusinian Mysteries and the Homeric Hymn to Demeter. According to a different view, the figures to the left are supposed to be Lacrateides' family members; the female figure is Lacrateides' wife Dionysia, and the boy one of their sons, either Sostratos or Dionysios.

Next to them is a central scene of the Eleusinian Mysteries, commonly dubbed the Mission of Triptolemus; a sitting Demeter gives the hero Triptolemus wheat so he can spread the practices of agriculture worldwide. Demeter's head is one of the few preserved ones of the votive, depicted youthful and covered with a veil. Triptolemus' head is not preserved, although it is clear it would be turned to the goddess who initiated him to the agricultural cult. He is sitting on a throne turned winged car, with his left hand stretched to receive the wheat. The wheel of the chariot, which was perhaps made of bronze, was secured in a deep cavity around which a dragon is coiled.

Between and behind Demeter and Triptolemus stands a figure holding torches, Persephone. She might have held a phiale and an oenochoe, or a wreath to crown Demeter, although it is hard to verify. Persephone faces Demeter, with her back at the rich-haired bearded man behind her to the right, Pluto, identified by the inscription next to his head. She is the sole figure on the relief who has her attention entirely on Demeter, as the rest are focusing on the whole scene of the Mission of Triptolemus. The torches in her hands symbolise her return from the Underworld as she takes her place beside her mother.

=== The other figures ===
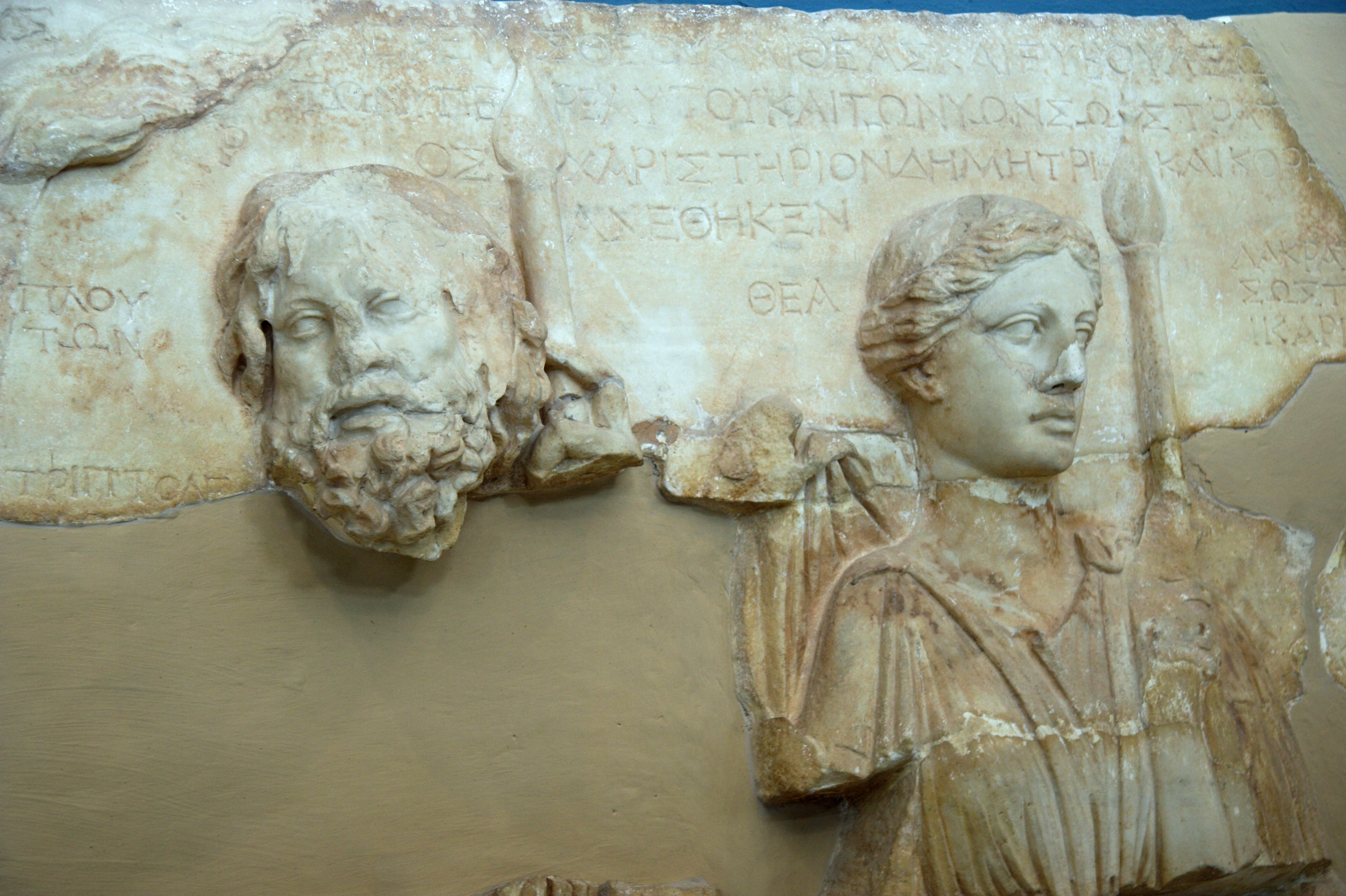
Pluto and Thea detail from the large votive relief.

Next to the bearded Pluto stands another female figure, and next to her a seated god, his head not preserved. They are identified by the inscription above their heads as Thea ("goddess") and Theos ("god") without more specific designation. The omission of the names of their names makes their role and attributes obscure. It might be an archaic and apotropaic way to refer to the infernal aspects of Persephone and Pluto in the Eleusinian religion, which would mean that Persephone and Hades appear on the relief twice. Eleusinian theology apparently favoured double appearances of deities in their artistic depictions, as also possibly seen with the Mandragone relief, another Eleusinian-themed votive found in Italy. It could be also that they are pre-Demetrian gods worshipped at Eleusis, or that it was forbidden to utter or spell their names. Thea and Theos might have been the oldest names under which the agricultural deities were worshipped in Eleusis, which other than Hades and Persephone also comparised Demeter herself, Dionysus, Eubuleus and Pluto. Foucart wrote that Theos and Thea represented the earliest designations of the Eleusinian deities, who then appear as Demeter and Persephone (Thea) and Eubuleus, Pluto and Dionysus (Theos).

To the right of Thea and Theos is the priest and dedicator of the sculpture himself, Lacrateides son of Sostratos from Icaria, although not many fragments of his figure other than the head and the inscription with his name survive. As attested in the inscription, Lacrateides was a priest of Thea, Theos and Eubuleus.

Behind the seated god stands the final form of the relief, a young man with long hair standing upright, wearing chiton that falls to his knees and carrying a large torch. His head is missing. This figure has been identified with several people, including Iacchus, Eubuleus and even a son of Lacrateides, though Eubuleus remains the most accepted theory, for his name appears in the inscription above. Moreover, archaeologist Rudolf Heberdey pointed out that the rightmost deity had to be Eubuleus, for it made little sense for Lacrateides, a priest of Eubuleus, to exclude the very god he served from his votive relief.

== See also ==
Other artefacts related to Eleusis and the Eleusinian mysteries include:

- Caryatids of Eleusis
- Ninnion Tablet
- Great Eleusinian Relief

== Bibliography ==
- Bernsdorff, Hans (2011). "Notes on P.Oxy. 3722 (Commentary on Anacreon)". Zeitschrift für Papyrologie und Epigraphik. 178: 29–34. JSTOR 41616749.
- Beschi, Luigi, "Demeter", in Lexicon Iconographicum Mythologiae Classicae (LIMC). IV.1: Eros – Herakles, Zurich and Munich, Artemis Verlag, 1986. ISBN 3-7608-8751-1. Internet Archive.
- Clinton, Kevin (2015). "Eleusinian Iconography: The Case of the Phantom Pi". Zeitschrift für Papyrologie und Epigraphik. 193: 133–40. JSTOR 43909675.
- Eliopoulos, Basileios (2000). Ελευσίς: Το Ανάγλυφο του Λακρατείδη [Eleusis: The Relief of Lacrateides] (in Greek). Peristeri, Athens: Hellen pub. ISBN 960-286-386-2.
- Kourouniotis, Konstantinos (1936). Eleusis: A Guide to the Excavations and the Museum (PDF). Translated by Oscar Broneer. Athens: The Archaeological Society at Athens.
- Leventi, Iphigeneia (2007). "The Mondragone Relief Revisited: Eleusinian Cult Iconography in Campania". Hesperia: The Journal of the American School of Classical Studies at Athens. 76 (1): 107–141. doi:10.2972/hesp.76.1.107. JSTOR 25068014.
- Mylonas, George Emmanouel (1961). Eleusis and the Eleusinian mysteries. New Jersey, US: Princeton University Press.
- Papangeli, Kalliope (2002). Eleusis: the archaeological site and the museum (PDF). Athens: Omilos Latsi. ISBN 960-86743-2-8.
- Schwarz, Gerda (1988), "Eubouleus", in Lexicon Iconographicum Mythologiae Classicae (LIMC). IV.1: Eros – Herakles, Zurich and Munich, Artemis Verlag, 1988. ISBN 3760887511. Internet Archive.
- Türk, Gustav, "Thea" in Paulys Realencyclopädie der classischen Altertumswissenschaft R-Z: V A.2. Metzler pub., Stuttgard, Germany, 1934.
