= Caryatids of Eleusis =

Caryatid statues

- Καρυάτιδες της Ελευσίνας
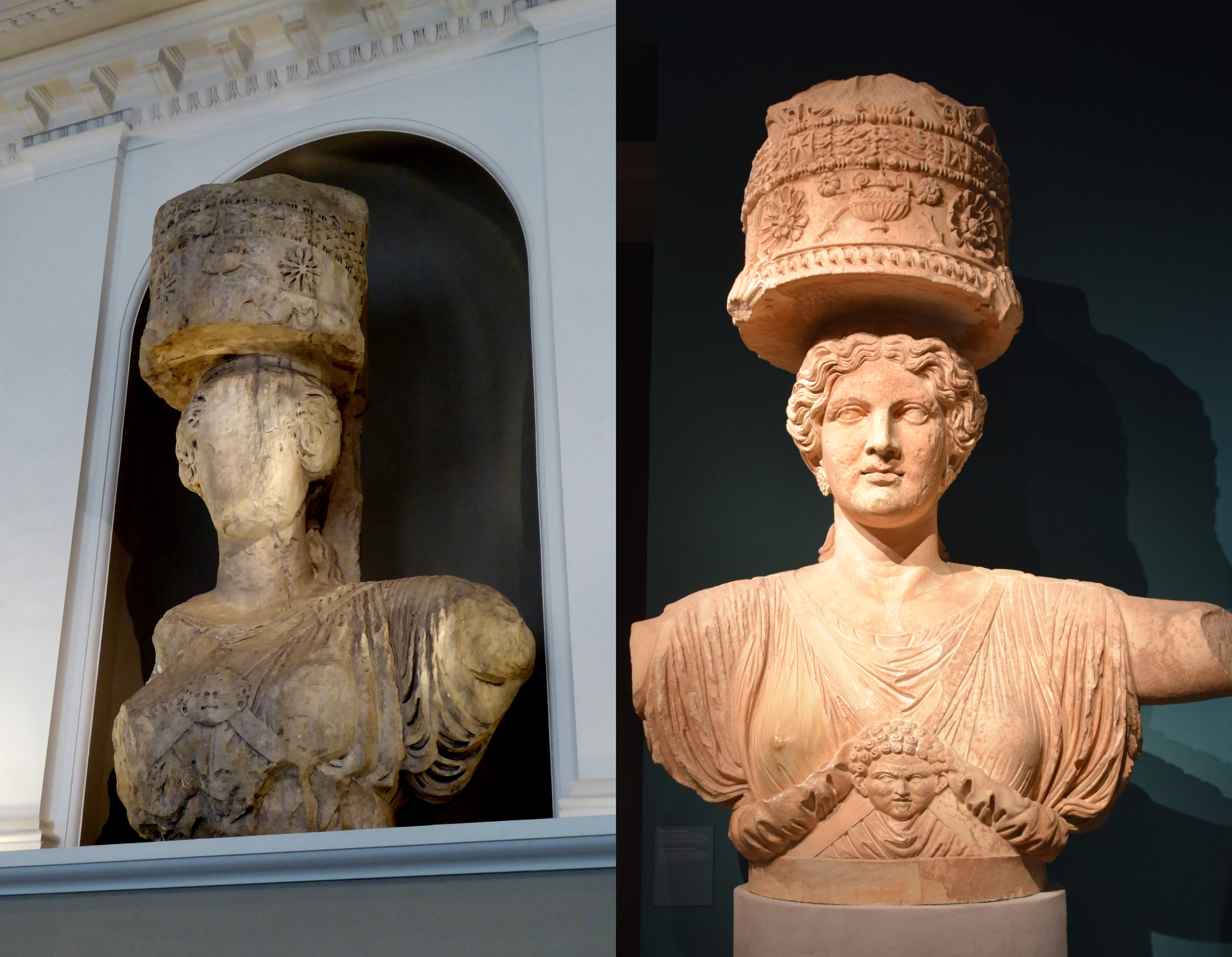
- Saint Demetra in the Fitzwilliam Museum and Caryatid B in the Archaeological Museum of Eleusis
- Type: Sculpture
- Material: Marble
- Height: 2.09 m (Saint Demetra); 1.96 m. (Caryatid B)
- Width: 1.50 m (Caryatid B)
- Created: 1st century BC
- Discovered: 1892 (Caryatid B); Eleusis
- Present location: Fitzwilliam Museum, Cambridge (Saint Demetra); Archaeological Museum of Eleusis, Eleusis (Caryatid B)
- Culture: Greco-Roman

In antiquity, two large Caryatids from the Lesser Propylaea adorned the sanctuary of the Greek goddess of agriculture Demeter at her cult-center of Eleusis in southern Greece as architectural support taking the place of columns. Following the Christianization of the Roman Empire, one of the Caryatids was dubbed Saint Demetra by the locals and venerated as patron saint of agriculture and crops throughout the following centuries. Saint Demetra was removed from Eleusis in 1801 by Englishman Edward Daniel Clarke, who later donated it to the University of Cambridge; it is on display in the Fitzwilliam Museum in Cambridge.

The second Caryatid B, preserved in a better condition than Saint Demetra though with significant restorations, was unearthed in Eleusis some ninety years after the other one was taken, and it is now exhibited in the Archaeological Museum of Eleusis.

== Dating and Christian veneration ==
It has been suggested that the pair were idealised portraits of the daughters of Appius Claudius Pulcher, the Roman consul who dedicated the gateway that they supported, between 54 and 48 BC.

Although Emperor Theodosius I issued the Edict of Thessalonica, banning paganism throughout the Roman Empire, people in Greece continued to worship Demeter, through a new Cult to "Saint Demetra", as patron saint of agriculture. The people of Eleusis venerated the caryatid as an icon of Saint Demetra, and would cover it with flowers and garlands, as they believed that the goddess was able to bring fertility to their fields and bless their crops.

The stories surrounding Saint Demetra had many similarities with the myth of Demeter's daughter Persephone's abduction by the underworld king Hades, only in the Christian context the girl had been abducted by a Turk instead. The worship of the marble sculpture as the uncanonised Saint Demetra (Greek: Αγία Δήμητρα) was against the traditions of the iconoclastic Church. Nevertheless, those traditions continued during the period of the Eastern Roman Empire, and, after its fall, well into the Ottoman era.

The statue was noted in 1676 by the traveller George Wheler, and several ambassadors who had submitted applications to the Ottomans for its removal without success. Around 1765–1766, the antiquary Richard Chandler, along with the architect Nicholas Revett and the painter William Pars, visited Eleusis and mentioned the statue as well as the local folklore about it.

== Removal of Saint Demetra ==
In 1801, English clergyman Edward Daniel Clarke and his assistant John Marten Cripps managed to obtain an authorisation through bribery from the governor of Athens for the removal of Saint Demetra, with the help of Giovanni Battista Lusieri, an Italian artist who was Lord Elgin's assistant at the time.

Clarke was the one to remove the statue by force, after bribing the local waiwode of Athens and obtaining an edict, despite the objections of the local population, who feared that removal of Saint Demetra would cause their crops to fail. Nevertheless, Clarke was successful, though not without struggle. An ox broke free of its halter the day before the removal and dashed against Saint Demetra with its horns, alarming the locals who took it to be a bad omen for the crops. Clarke assured them that they would suffer no harm, and brought a Christian priest from Aegina who first broke the soil around the statue to prove nothing would happen.

On 23 April 1802, the ship carrying the statue was driven ashore at Beachy Head on the south coast of England, though the Saint Demetra was recovered the following year. The Eleusinians had a good harvest the following year, which confirmed their belief that the caryatid would some day be returned to them; but then came a run of bad years in succession, which they blamed on them having allowed Saint Demetra to be taken away.

He donated Saint Demetra along with other finds to the University of Cambridge in 1803; the statue of Demeter was displayed at the University Library. In 1865 the collection was transferred to the Fitzwilliam Museum in Cambridge, where it became one of the museum's two main collections.

In 2022, the municipality of Elefsina (modern Eleusis) asked the museum to return Saint Demetra to Greece.

== Description ==
The Caryatids are very similar, though not identical, even after the extensive damage Saint Demetra bears, compared to the Eleusis Caryatid, is taken into account. Both only have their colossal torsos, heads and headgear surviving, though it is more likely than not that both originally represented a full-length figure, with their arms raised above their head to hold the cylindrical object that balances upon it, the 'cista'. The cista was a type of container often used to store cosmetics. The cistas held by the caryatids probably contained sacred objects associated with the rites conducted at Eleusis, though such knowledge does not exist.

The vessel on both caryatids are decorated with emblems and items associated with the rituals of the Eleusinian Mysteries, such as ears of corn, rosettes, cakes, and bundles of myrtle. A plemochoe is carved directly above the brow of each female figure, that is, a container where the kykeon was most likely held. The kykeon was the sacred drink used during initiation into Demeter and Persephone's cult.

The two priestesses wear two tunics each, which are secured on their breast with diagonally crossing straps; their chest is further decorated with a gorgoneion brooch. Saint Demetra's face, which is no longer preserved, was inclined to the left, as though she was looking down onto those passing in procession through the gateway beneath her. The face of the Caryatid B is much better preserved. The better-preserved Caryatid measures 196 cm in height and 150 cm in width. They weigh around two tonnes each.

== Gallery ==
Caryatids of Eleusis

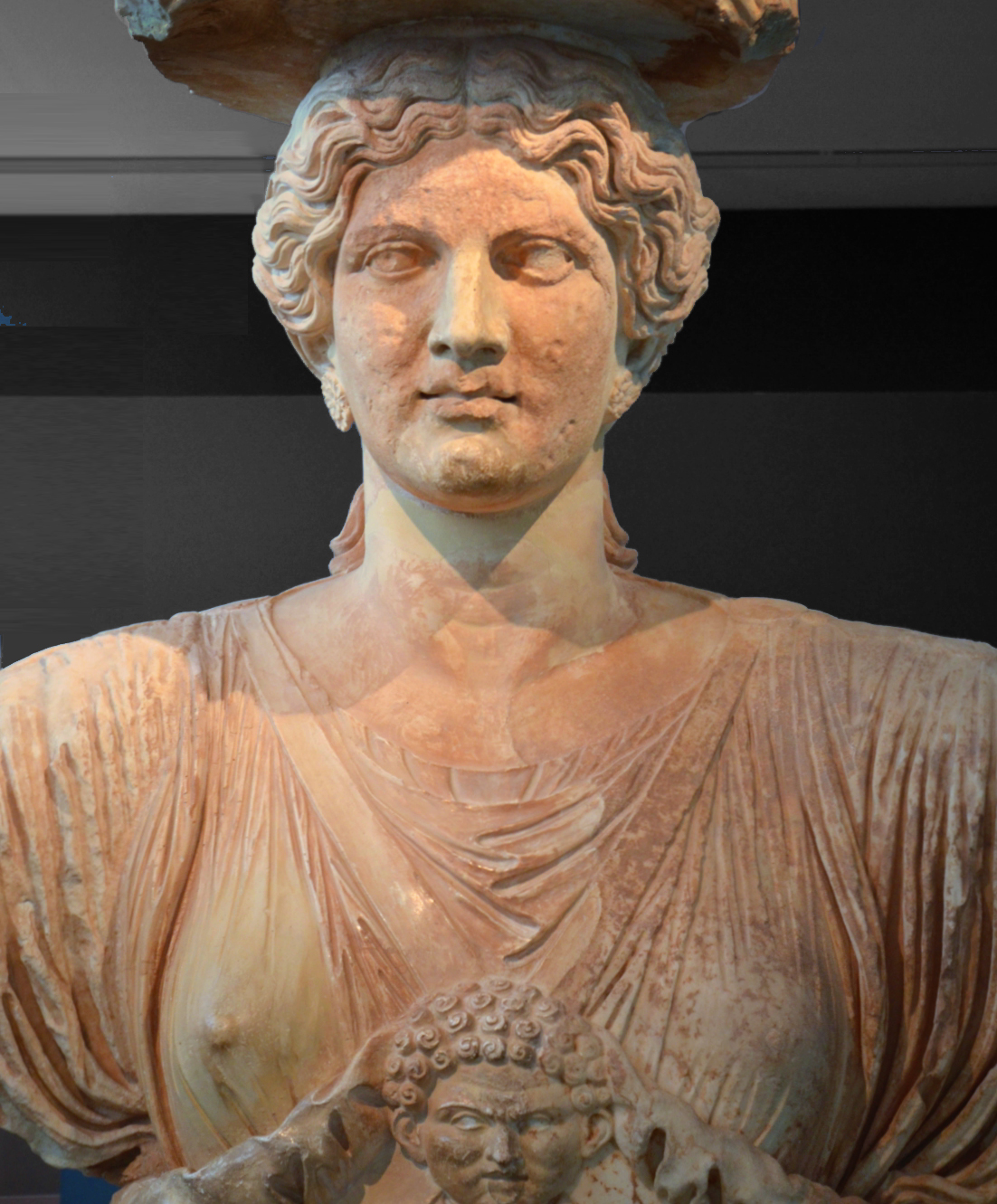
Face of Caryatid B

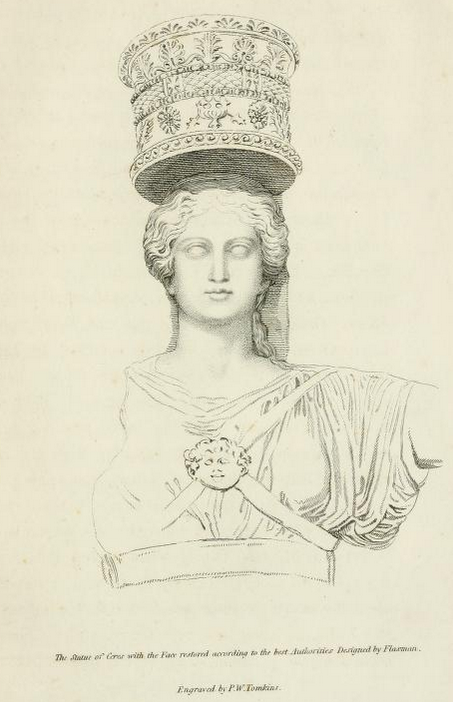
Engraving by P. W. Tomkins

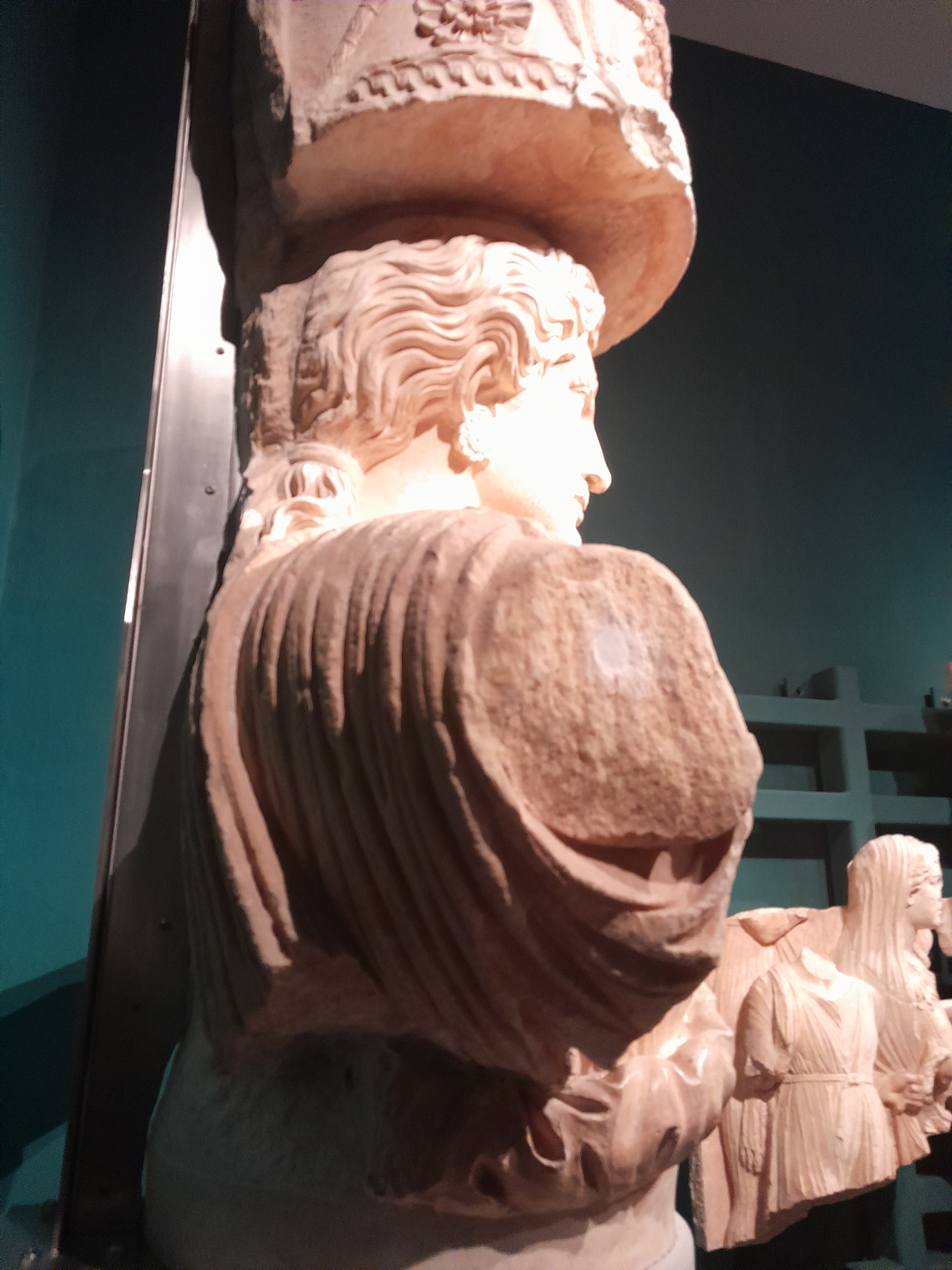
Posterior view.

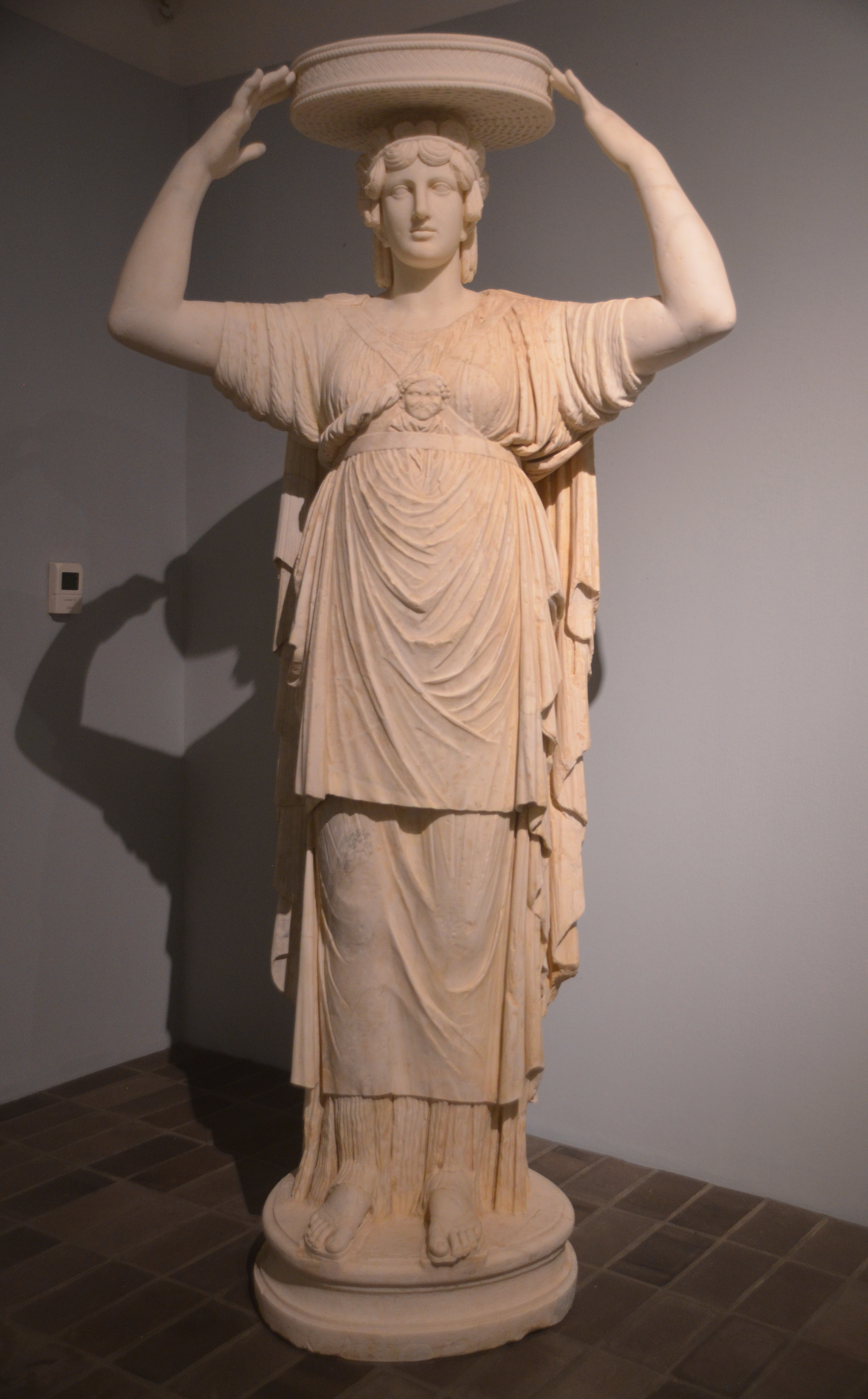
Torlonia Caryatid of the Eleusis type

== See also ==
- Elgin Marbles, collection of sculptures taken from the Parthenon.
- Las Incantadas, four columns with reliefs taken from Salonica.
- Aegina Treasure, Minoan gold hoard taken from Aegina.
- Votive relief to Isis-Demeter, Dion.
- Terpsichore statuette from Dodona, illegally smuggled and repatriated in 2024
- Lacrateides Relief, Eleusinian votive relief

== Bibliography ==
- Cosmopoulos, Michael B. (2015). Bronze Age Eleusis and the Origins of the Eleusinian Mysteries. Cambridge University Press. ISBN 978-1-316-36823-7.
- Fagan, Brian (2006). From Stonehenge to Samarkand: An Anthology of Archaeological Travel Writing. Oxford University Press. ISBN 978-0-19-516091-8.
- Lawson, John Cuthbert (2012). Modern Greek Folklore and Ancient Greek Religion: A Study in Survivals. Cambridge University Press. pp. 79–80. ISBN 978-1-107-67703-6.
- Sharma, Arvind (2005). Goddesses And Women In The Indic Religious Tradition. BRILL. ISBN 978-90-04-12466-0.
- Spivey, Nigel (2013). Greek Sculpture. Cambridge University Press. ISBN 978-1-107-06704-2.
