= Stellio =

Stellio may refer to:

- Laudakia stellio, a species of lizard
- An obsolete name for the constellation Lacerta
- The modern proper name of Alpha Lacertae, the brightest star in Lacerta
- Steirastoma stellio, a species of beetle
- Synelasma stellio, a species of beetle
- Stellia gens, a family of ancient Rome
- The Roman name of Ascalabus, a figure in Greek mythology

== People with the given name ==
- Stellio Lorenzi, a French screenwriter
- Stelio Zupancich, a Canadian ice hockey player
- Kémi Séba, an African political figure born Stellio Gilles Robert Capo Chichi
