= Parazosmotes scincus =

Scientific classification
- Kingdom: Animalia
- Phylum: Arthropoda
- Class: Insecta
- Order: Coleoptera
- Suborder: Polyphaga
- Infraorder: Cucujiformia
- Family: Cerambycidae
- Genus: Parazosmotes
- Species: P. scincus

Binomial name
- Parazosmotes scincus (Pascoe, 1865)

Synonyms
- Synelasma scincus Pascoe, 1865; Parazosmotes borneensis Breuning, 1959

Species of beetle

Parazosmotes scincus is a species of beetle in the family Cerambycidae. It was described by Francis Polkinghorne Pascoe in 1865, originally under the genus Synelasma. It is known from Borneo.
