= Ascalabus =

In Greek mythology, was a son of Misme

Ascalabus (Ancient Greek: Ἀσκάλαβος), in Greek mythology, was a son of Misme.

== Mythology ==
When Demeter, on her wanderings in search of her daughter Persephone who had been abducted by Hades, came to Misme in Attica, the goddess was received kindly, and being exhausted and thirsty, Misme gave her something to drink (a kykeon). As the goddess emptied the vessel at one draught, Ascalabus laughed at her, and ordered a whole cask to be brought. Demeter, indignant at the boy's conduct, sprinkled the few remaining drops from her vessel upon him and thereby changed him into a gecko (ἀσκάλαβος). The tale is preserved in Antoninus Liberalis' Metamorphoses, which cites Nicander's lost Heteroeumena. The tale is also told in Ovid's Metamorphoses, though Ascalabus and his mother go unnamed: "presumably... to avoid confusion with Ascalaphus".

In Roman versions of the story, where Demeter is called Ceres, Ascalabus is often named Stellio.

== See also ==
- Baubo
- Iambe
- Metaneira
