= Akhaj =

- Village
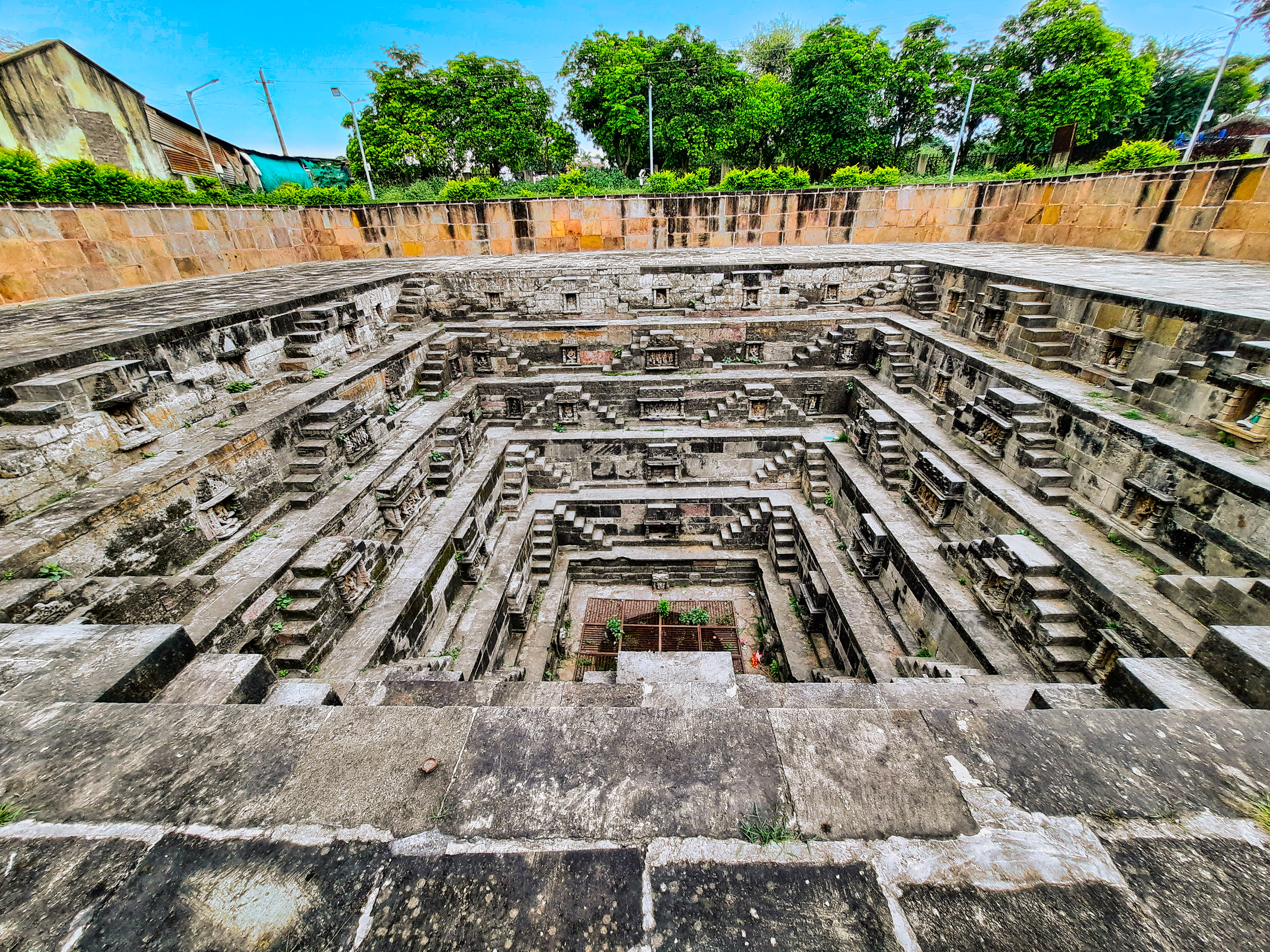
- Shakti Kund

- Location in Gujarat, India Akhaj (India)
- Coordinates: 23.483434°N 72.461774°E
- Country: India
- State: Gujarat
- District: Mehsana

Population (2011)
  - Total: 4,634

Languages
  - Official: Gujarati, Hindi
- Time zone: UTC+5:30 (IST)
- PIN: 382710
- Vehicle registration: GJ-2
- Nearest city: Mehsana

Akhaj is a village in Mehsana Taluka of Mehsana district in the state of Gujarat, India.

== History ==
The village was situated on the way of Anahilawad Patan and Ashapalli (modern Ahmedabad) in ancient times.

== Demographics ==
As of 2011, Akhaj has a population of 4634: 2404 men and 2230 women.

== Places of interest ==
=== Shakti Kund ===
There is a stepped reservoir (kunda) known as Shakti Kund in village. It was built in the third quarter of the 10th century during Chaulukya rule (Māru-Gurjara architecture). It is older than the Surya Kunda at the Sun temple of Modhera. There are number of fragments of the extinct temple and gateway (kirti torana) nearby so there must be a temple dedicated to Goddess in the past and the Kunda was associated with it. The fragments include pillars and capitals, beams and arches, figures of divinities and others, fragments of spire (shikhara), cogged wheel (amalaka) and cupola (kalasha). The square kunda has round well in the centre which can be reached by flight of steps with three levels of landings and the principal platform at the top. The niches under these steps contain eight statues of Ganesha in various forms as well as other deities such as Shitala, Agni, Brahma, Yama, Yami, Lakshmi, Saptarishi, Matrika, Mahishasurmardini, Harihararka (composite of Shiva, Vishnu and Surya), Varuna, Lajjagauri, Indrani, Nirṛti, Kubera, Kartikeya. Some figures are unidentifiable due to erosion and damage. It is the state protected monument (S-GJ-284).

There is a Shiva temple nearby.

== Economy ==
Agriculture is the main source of income for people of the village.
