= Dilukai =

Palauan wooden figures

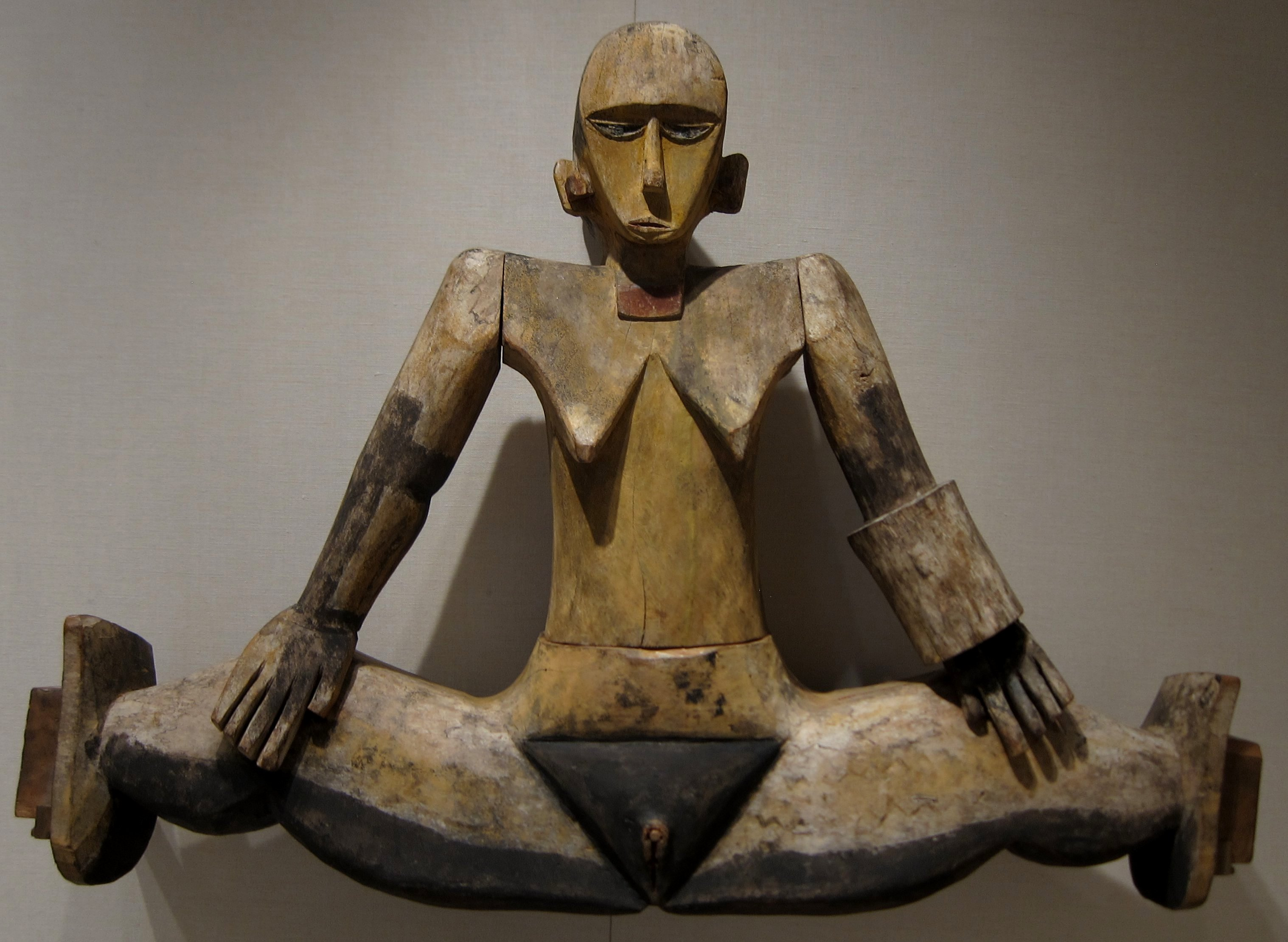
Dilukai from the Caroline Islands, Belau (Palau), 19th-early 20th century, Metropolitan Museum of Art

Dilukai, Belau culture, Micronesia

Dilukai (or dilukái or dilugai) are wooden figures of young women carved over the doorways of chiefs' houses (bai) in the Palauan archipelago. They are typically shown with legs splayed, revealing a large, black, triangular pubic area with the hands resting on the thighs. These female figures protect the villagers' health and crops and ward off evil spirits. They were traditionally carved by ritual specialists according to strict rules, which, if broken, would result in the deaths of the carver and the chief. Female figures presenting their vulva can be found in many cultures: they symbolize fertility, (spiritual) rebirth, and they protect from evil (see above).

== Mythology ==
Another explanation of Dilukai is that a woman named Dilukái was the sister of a troublesome man named Atmatuyuk. He eventually departed and these images of his sister were erected to prevent his return, as it was forbidden for a brother to see his sister’s genitalia.

Other analysts interpret Dilukais as men or women figures designed to empower their sexuality. They were usually standing at the center of public "meeting" houses.

Christian missionaries were not fond of Dilukai, and changed the context, claiming that their purpose was to shame an immoral woman.

== See also ==
- Anasyrma
- Baubo
- Lajja Gauri
- Nin-imma
- Sheela na gig
- Yoni
