= Synelasma bufo =

Scientific classification
- Kingdom: Animalia
- Phylum: Arthropoda
- Class: Insecta
- Order: Coleoptera
- Suborder: Polyphaga
- Infraorder: Cucujiformia
- Family: Cerambycidae
- Genus: Synelasma
- Species: S. bufo

Binomial name
- Synelasma bufo Pascoe, 1858

Species of beetle

Synelasma bufo is a species of beetle in the family Cerambycidae. It was described by Francis Polkinghorne Pascoe in 1858.

== Subspecies ==
- Synelasma bufo sumatranus Breuning, 1954
- Synelasma bufo bufo Pascoe, 1858
