= Sheela na gig =

European sculpture motif

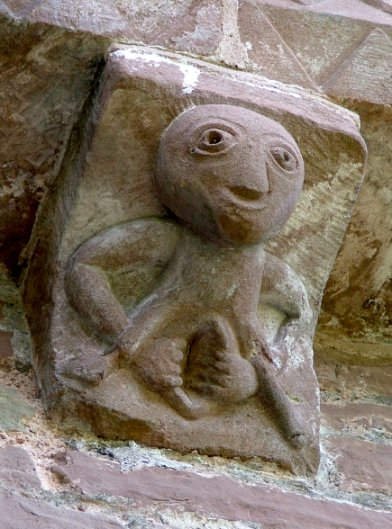
A 12th-century sheela na gig on the church at Kilpeck, Herefordshire, England

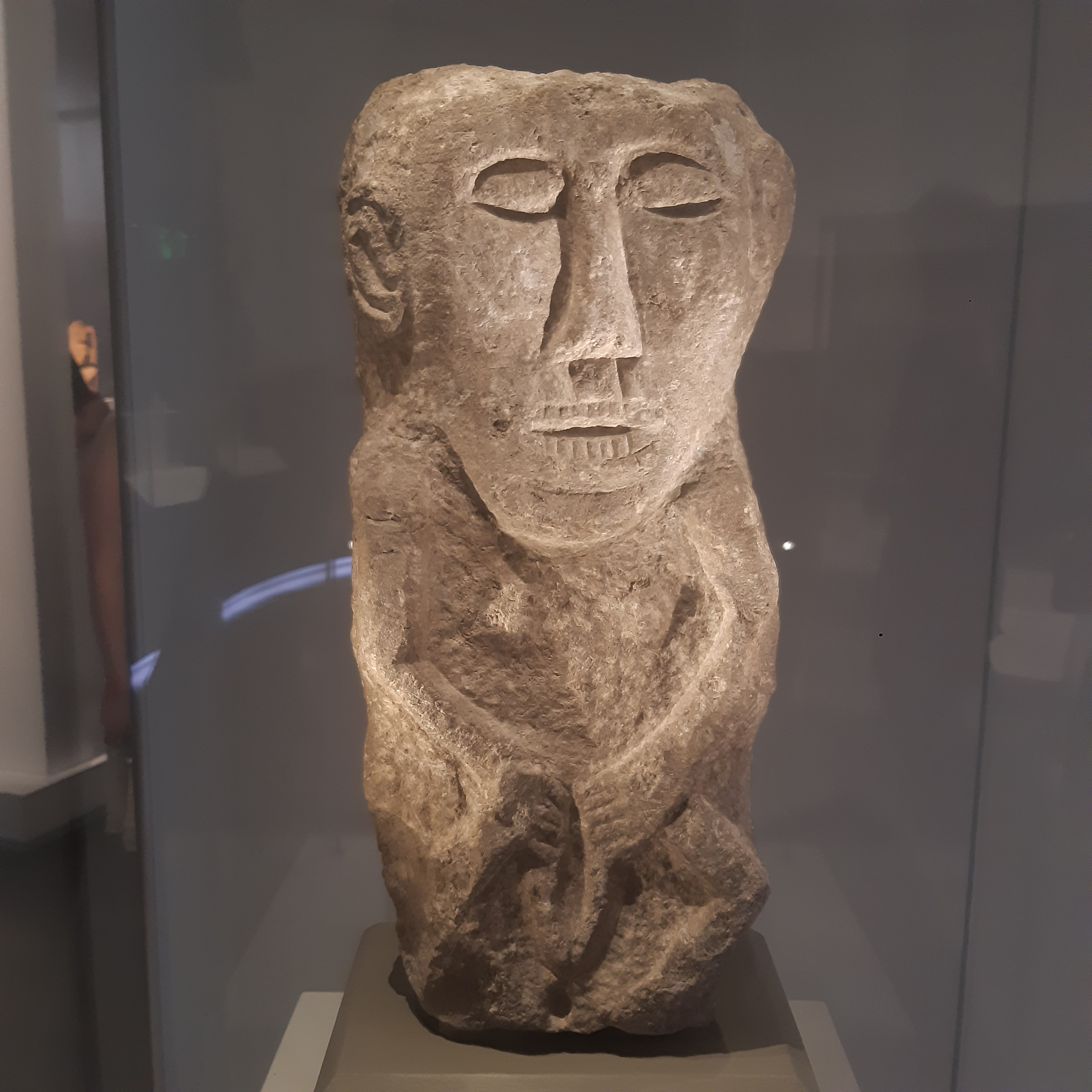
Sheela na gig from Ireland in the British Museum (12th century)

A sheela na gig is a figurative carving of a naked woman displaying an exaggerated vulva. These carvings, from the Middle Ages, are architectural grotesques found throughout most of Europe on cathedrals, castles, and other buildings.

The greatest concentrations can be found in Ireland, Great Britain, France and Spain, sometimes together with male figures. Ireland has the greatest number of surviving sheela na gig carvings; Joanne McMahon and Jack Roberts cite 124 examples in Ireland and 45 examples in Britain. One of the best examples may be found in the Round Tower at Rattoo, in County Kerry, Ireland. There is a replica of the Round Tower sheela na gig in the County Museum in Tralee town. Another well-known example may be seen at Kilpeck in Herefordshire, England.

The carvings may have been used to ward off death, evil and demons. Other grotesque carvings, such as gargoyles and hunky punks, were frequently part of church decorations all over Europe. It is commonly said that their purpose was to keep evil spirits away (a practice known as apotropaic magic). They often are positioned over doors or windows, presumably to protect these openings.

== Origin ==
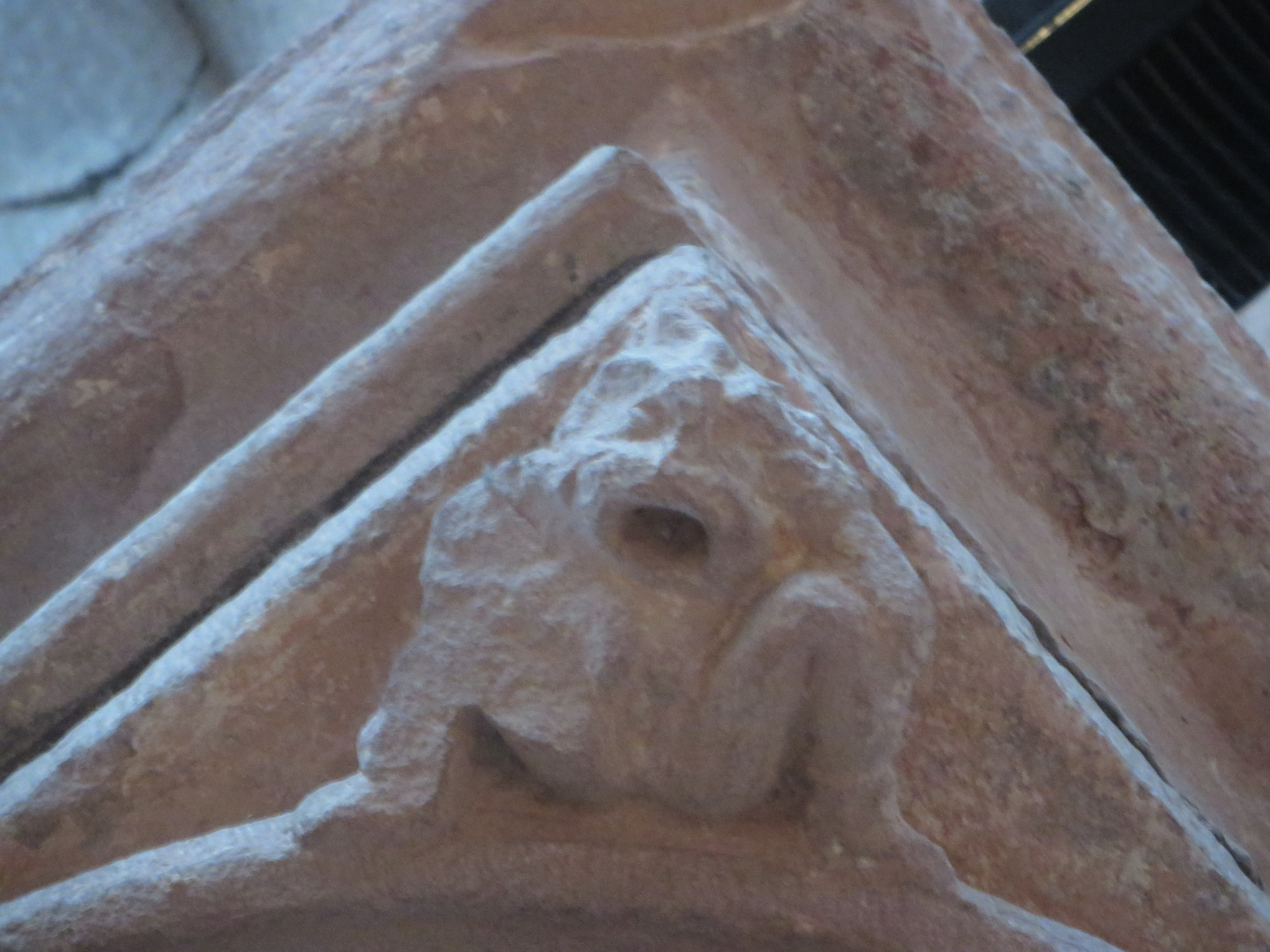
Sheela na gig on the south-west pillar of the presbytery in St. Magnus Cathedral, Kirkwall, Orkney, ca. 12th to 13th centuries, Norman and Romanesque.

Scholars disagree about the origins of the figures. James Jerman and Anthony Weir believe the sheela na gigs were first carved in France and Spain during the 11th century; the motif eventually reached Britain and then Ireland in the 12th century. Jerman's and Weir's work was a continuation of research begun by Jørgen Andersen, who wrote The Witch on the Wall (1977), the first serious book on sheela na gigs. Eamonn Kelly, Keeper of Irish Antiquities at the National Museum of Ireland in Dublin, draws attention to the distribution of sheela na gigs in Ireland to support Weir's and Jerman's theory; almost all of the surviving in situ sheela na gigs are found in areas of Anglo-Norman conquest (12th century). The areas which remained governed by native Irish have few sheela na gigs. Weir and Jerman also argue their location on churches and the grotesque features of the figures, by medieval standards, suggests they represented female lust as hideous and sinfully corrupting.

Another theory, espoused by Joanne McMahon and Jack Roberts, is that the carvings are remnants of a pre-Christian fertility or mother goddess religion. They note what they claim are differences of materials and styles of some sheela na gigs from their surrounding structures, and noting some are turned on their side, to support the idea they were incorporated from previous structures into early Christian buildings.

== Etymology ==
The name was first published in the Proceedings of the Royal Irish Academy 1840–1844, as a local name for a carving once present on a church gable wall in Rochestown, County Tipperary, Ireland; the name also was recorded in 1840 by John O'Donovan, an official of the Ordnance Survey of Ireland, referring to a figure on Kiltinan Castle, County Tipperary. Scholars disagree about the origin and meaning of the name in Ireland, as it is not directly translatable into Irish. Alternative spellings of "Sheela" may sometimes be encountered; they include Sheila, Síle and Síla. According to the Oxford English Dictionary, it is derived from Irish, Síle na gcíoch, meaning "Julia of the breasts".

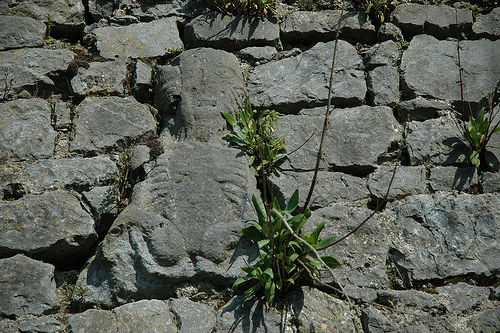
Sheela na gig on town wall in Fethard, County Tipperary, Ireland

Jørgen Andersen writes that the name is an Irish phrase, originally either Sighle na gCíoch, meaning "the old hag of the breasts", or Síle ina Giob, meaning "Sheila (from the Irish Síle, the Irish form of the Anglo-Norman name Cecile or Cecilia) on her hunkers". Patrick S. Dinneen also gives Síle na gCíoċ, stating it is "a stone fetish representing a woman, supposed to give fertility, generally thought to have been introduced by the Normans." Other researchers have questioned these interpretations – few sheela na gigs are shown with breasts – and expressed doubt about the linguistic connection between ina Giob and na Gig. The phrase "sheela na gig" was said to be a term for a hag or old woman.

Barbara Freitag devotes a chapter to the etymology of the name in her book Sheela-Na-Gigs: Unravelling an Enigma. She documents references earlier than 1840, including a Royal Navy ship Sheela Na Gig HMS Shelanagig (1780), and an 18th-century dance called the Sheela na gig. The Irish slip jig, first published as "The Irish Pot Stick" (c.1758), appears as "Shilling a Gig" in Brysson's A Curious Collection of Favourite Tunes (1791) and "Sheela na Gigg" in Hime's 48 Original Irish Dances (c.1795). These are the oldest recorded references to the name, but do not apply to the architectural figures. The Royal Navy's records indicate the name of the ship refers to an "Irish female sprite". Freitag discovered that "gig" was a Northern English slang word for a woman's genitals. A similar word in modern Irish slang gigh (pronounced [ɟiː]) also exists, pronounced ghee and meaning vulva, further confusing the possible origin of the name.

Weir and Jerman use the name sheela for the figure because it had entered popular usage; they also term figures of both sexes "exhibitionist". They cite Andersen's second chapter as a good discussion of the name. Andersen says there is no evidence that "sheela na gig" was ever a popular name for the figures when they were created. It began during the mid-19th century "where popular understanding of the characteristics of a sheela were vague and people were wary of its apparent rudeness". An earlier reference to the dubious nature of the name is made by H. C. Lawlor in an article in Man Vol. 31, January 1931 (Royal Anthropological Institute of Great Britain and Ireland), in which he writes, "The term 'sheela-na-gig' has no etymological meaning and is an absurd name." Andersen, Weir and Jerman, and Freitag all dismiss the name as being modern and somewhat arbitrary.

The oldest recorded name for one of the figures is "The Idol", which relates to the figure at Holy Cross Church in Binstead on the Isle of Wight. This name was mentioned by R. Worsley in his The History of the Isle of Wight (1781) and noted also by J. Albin in A New, Correct, and Much-improved History of the Isle of Wight (1795) (Andersen page 11). The name "The Idol" also was applied to a now lost figure in Lusk, Ireland and was recorded as being in use around 1783.

== Hypotheses ==
Much of the disagreement among scholars about these figures concerns exactly what they are meant to represent, and no theory explains all the figures.

=== Survival of a pagan goddess ===
A popular hypothesis is sheela na gigs represent a pagan goddess, but academics believe the situation was more complex, with multiple interpretations and roles for the female character as spiritual traditions changed over time. The goddess in question usually is identified as Celtic, the hag-like Cailleach figure of Irish and Scottish mythology. Margaret Murray proposed this, as did Anne Ross, who wrote in her essay "The Divine Hag of the Pagan Celts", "I would like to suggest that in their earliest iconographic form they do in fact portray the territorial or war-goddess in her hag-like aspect". Georgia Rhoades suggests the figures may represent the crone or an earth goddess from Celtic mythology.

Mircea Eliade's The Encyclopedia of Religion (1993) draws parallels between the sheela na gig and the ancient Irish myth of the goddess who granted kingship. She would appear as a lustful hag, and most men would refuse her advances, except for one man who accepted. When he had relations with her, she was transformed into a beautiful maiden who would confer royalty onto him and bless his reign. There are additional variants of this common Northern European motif (see "Loathly lady"). Andersen devotes a chapter to this theory, entitled "Pagan or Medieval". While suggesting possible pagan influences on Irish sheela na gigs, he considers them as having a medieval context. He argues that pagan origins are less likely than influence from the continent during the medieval period: "What can be said against it, is that it is less easily proved and can be less easily illustrated than the possible continental, French origin for the motif discussed in earlier chapters" (The Witch on the Wall, p. 95).

Weir and Jerman explore the possible influence of the ancient Greek Baubo figurine on the motif, but they acknowledge the link is tenuous. They write, "It makes for very interesting speculation, but the amount of evidence is not large".

Freitag explores possible Celtic pagan origins, but finds little to suggest a link; "in particular the notion of the divine hag being a portrayal of the Ur-Sheela has to be firmly dismissed as wayward conjecture" (Sheela na gigs: Unravelling an Enigma, page 41). Although scholars have used evidence to reject the theory, it is popularly held.

=== Fertility ===
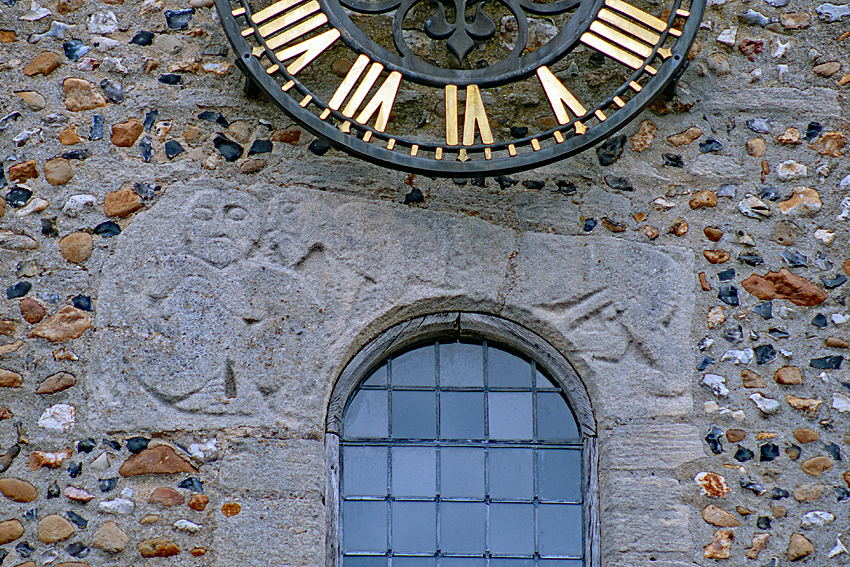
Sheela na Gig and male figure, Whittlesford

This hypothesis usually is combined with the "goddess" explanation. Barbara Freitag suggests the figures were used in a fertility context and associate them with "birthing stones". There is folkloric evidence of at least some of the sheela na gigs being used in this manner, with the figures being loaned out to women in labour. Other examples are associated with wedding traditions. According to Margaret Murray, the figure in Oxford at the church of St Michael at the North Gate has an associated tradition of being shown to brides on their wedding day. This theory does not seem to apply to all the figures: some are thin with their ribs showing and thin breasts, which do not suggest fertility. Others are plump and are shown in a sexual context with a partner (as at Whittlesford). Theresa Oakley and Alex Woodcock recently discovered an exhibitionist couple at Devizes, who seem to represent fertility. The faces of some figures are striated, indicating scarring or tattoos. Weir notes a close examination of the figures reveals features which are not consistent with a fertility function.

=== Warning against lust ===
Weir and Jerman suggested the sheela na gigs served to warn against lust. They see the figures as a religious warning against sins of the flesh. Exhibitionist figures of all types—male, female, and bestial—are found frequently in the company of images of beasts devouring people and other hellish images. These images, they argue, were used as a means of religious instruction to a largely illiterate populace. As part of this interpretation, they explore a continental origin for the figures. Andersen first suggested this origin, and Weir and Jerman continued and expanded this line of inquiry. They argue the motif migrated from the continent via the pilgrim routes to and from Santiago de Compostela. (Freitag argues against this.) Pilgrim sculptors noted what they had seen on the route and ended up carving their own interpretations of the motifs. Eventually, the exhibitionist motif was transferred to Ireland and Britain. This theory seems to accommodate many of the religious figures but relates less well to some of the secular ones. Images carved on castles would not seem to be serving a religious purpose. The figure at Haddon Hall appears on a stable (although this may have been moved from elsewhere). The theory does not seem to apply to all the figures.

=== Protection against evil ===
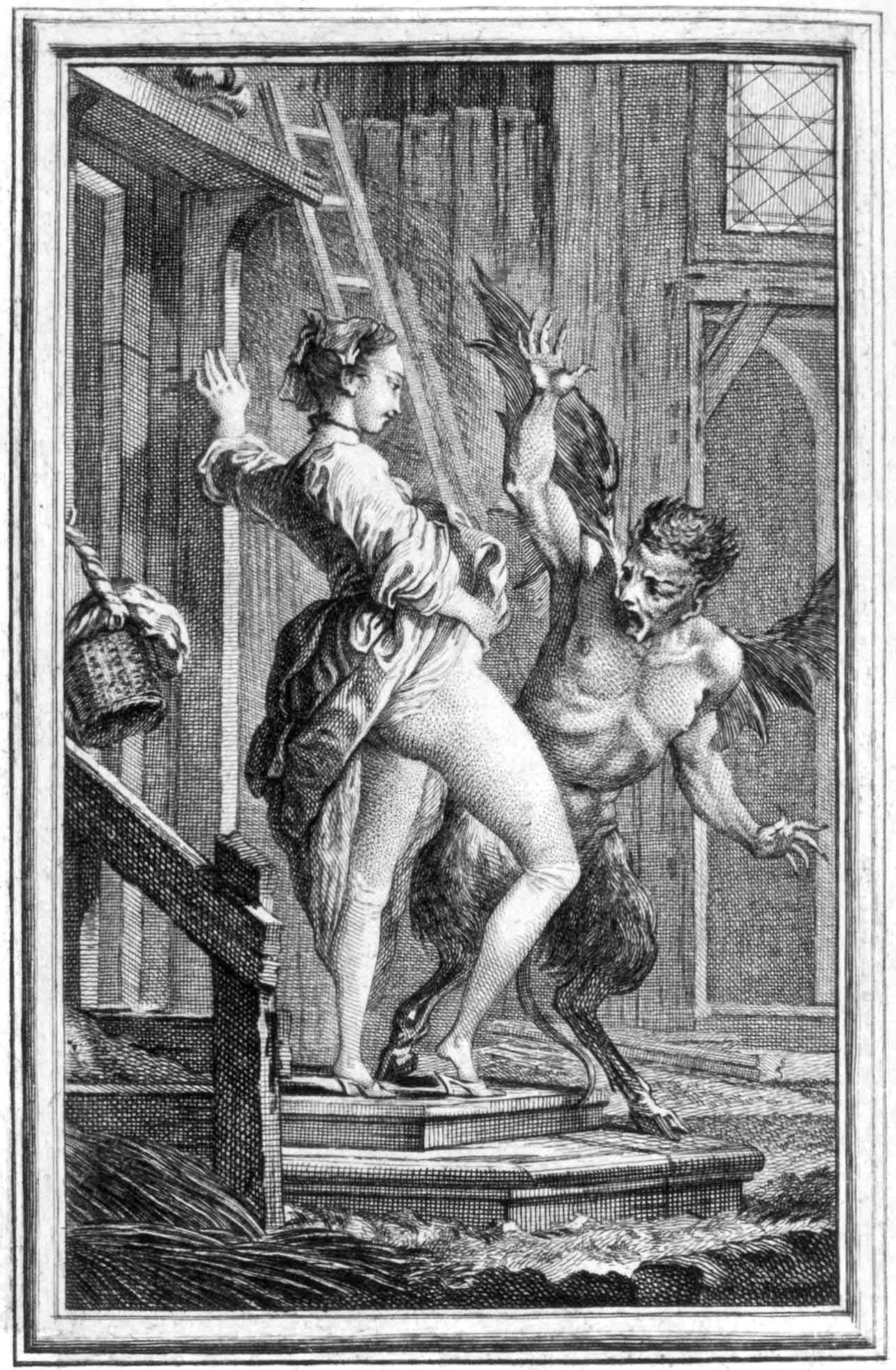
La Fontaine plate, illustrated by Charles Eisen (1762)

Andersen and Weir and Jerman think the figures may also have been used as protection against evil. This would explain the use of the figures on structures such as castles. They served an apotropaic function, designed to ward off evil. In Ireland, some of the figures were called "The Evil Eye Stones", which supported their theory. Some folkloric evidence is known of anasyrma (skirt-lifting) being used by women to ward off evil spirits.

Andersen reproduces an 18th-century illustration by Charles Eisen from La Fontaine's Nouveaux Contes (1764) showing a demon being repulsed by the sight of a woman lifting her skirt to display her genitals.

Weir and Jerman relate a story from The Irish Times (23 September 1977) in which a potentially violent incident involving several men was averted by a woman exposing her genitals to them. They doubt, however, whether the story was true. Weir and Jerman go on to suggest that the apotropaic function seems to have been gradually ascribed to the figures over time. While this theory seems to apply to most of the secular and some of the religious figures, it does not apply to all of them.

=== Feminist reinterpretation of the image ===
Feminist scholarship has reinterpreted the concept of the sheela na gig, especially the image as evil or an embodiment of sin. Feminists have adopted the image as an icon, with feminist authors viewing the sexuality of the sheela na gig as an empowering figure. Reverence for female sexuality and vulvas can be seen in the art of Judy Chicago's The Dinner Party and The Vagina Monologues by Eve Ensler. In Wide-open to Mirth and Wonder, Luz Mar González-Arias argues that the creative re-imagining of this medieval female figure can "encourage contemporary women to stop perceiving their own corporeality as a heavy, awkward and shameful burden of guilt". Irish writer Molly Mullin's essay Representations of History, Irish Feminism, and the Politics of Difference claims that the image of the Sheela na gig has almost become emblematic of Irish feminism as a force for hope and change. Scholar Georgia Rhoades argues that for many contemporary feminists the gesture of the Sheela's unapologetic sexual display is "a message about her body, its power and significance—a gesture of rebellion against misogyny, rather than an endorsement of it".

=== Mater Ecclesia interpretation ===
A Christian interpretation was proposed by Danish physician and obstetrician Erling Rump in 1976. Rump suggested that the Sheela-na-gig represented Mater Ecclesia (Mother Church) giving birth, emphasizing the life-giving significance of the female body rather than a personification of sin or an erotic figure. He interpreted carving positioned above church entrances as conveying a positive invitation to enter the Church, drawing upon New Testament passages including John 3:3-5, concerning spiritual rebirth. Barbara Freitag discusses Rump's interpretation in Sheela-na-gigs: Unravelling an Enigma (2004), while advancing a different explanation centered on childbirth and folk religion.

== Distribution ==
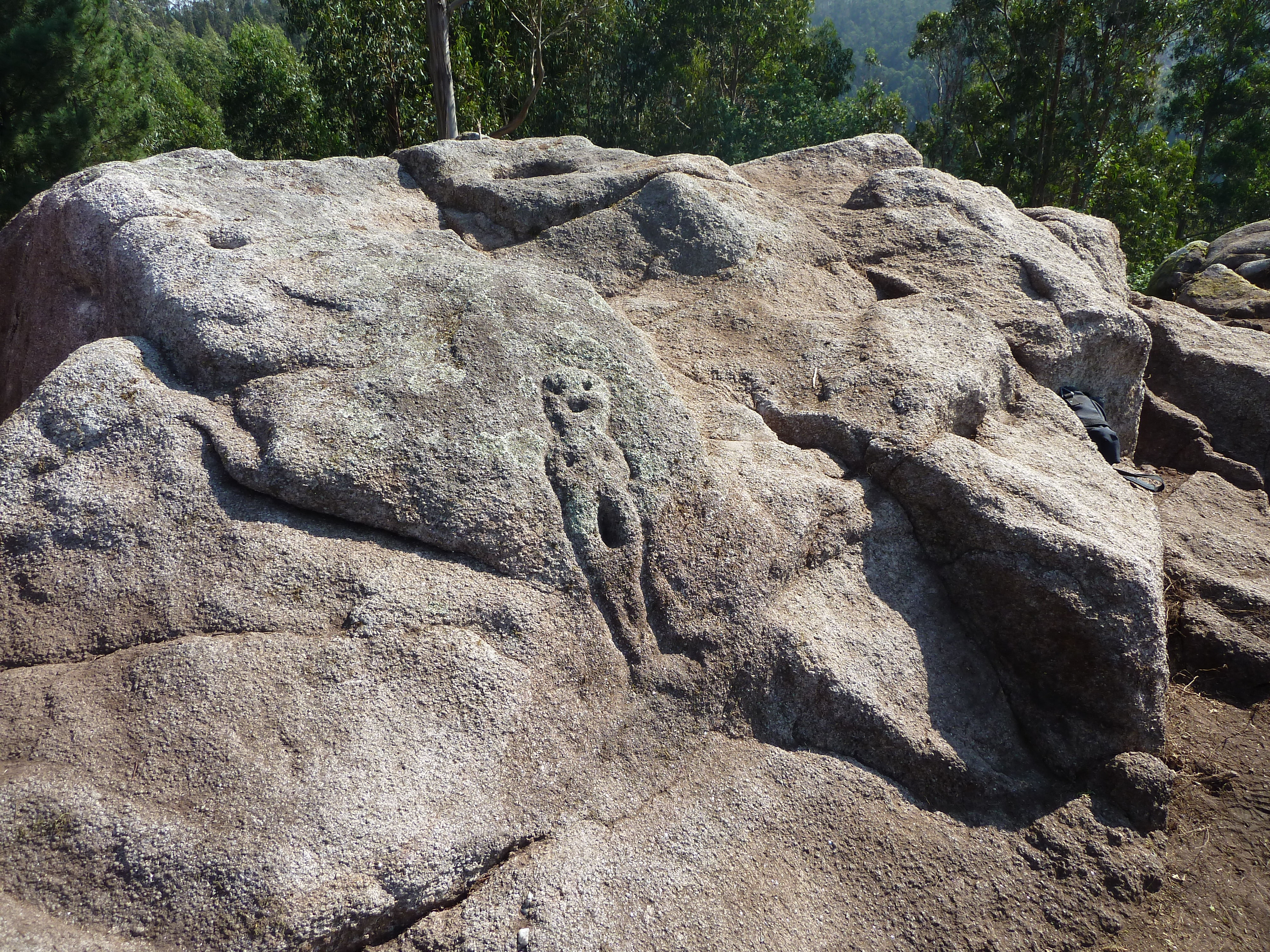
A sheela-like figure in a non-architectural context, the "santuario rupestre" at Coirós, Province of A Coruña, Galicia, Spain.

As noted above, Ireland has the greatest number of known sheela na gigs. At one time, they were mistakenly thought to be a uniquely Irish practice; however, scholars realized that the sheela na gig motif could be found all over western and central Europe. Accurate numbers of figures are difficult to reach, as the interpretation of what is a sheela na gig will vary among scholars. For example, Freitag omits the Rochester figure from her list while Weir and Jerman include it. Concannon includes some worn figures which only she has identified as sheela na gigs. With renewed interest in the topic, scholars have recently identified previously unknown figures, so more could be discovered.

A significant number of figures are found in Romanesque contexts, especially in France, northern Spain, Britain, and Norway. In Ireland figures commonly are found in areas of Norman influence.

Contemporary examples can be found in Ireland as part of Project Sheela.

== Parallels ==
The Encyclopedia of Religion, in its article on yoni, notes the similarity between the positioning of many sheela na gigs above doorways or windows and the wooden female figures carved over the doorways of chiefs' houses (bai) in the Palauan archipelago. Called dilukai (or dilugai), they are typically shown with legs splayed, revealing a large, black, triangular pubic area; the hands rest upon the thighs. The writers of the encyclopedia article say:

These female figures protect the villagers' health and ward off all evil spirits as well. They are constructed by ritual specialists according to strict rules, which if broken would result in the specialist's as well as the chief's death. It is not coincidental that each example of signs representing the female genitalia used as apotropaic devices are found on gates. The vulva is the primordial gate, the mysterious divide between nonlife and life.

Consistent with these interpretations is the way prehistoric rock art from across southern Africa depicts a mythical figure known widely among archaeologists as the 'spread-legged woman'. Photographs reproduced in a detailed study show a group of such figures arranged next to one another so as to comprise a horizontal line. Depicted by the unknown artist using red ochre pigment, each squatting figure points downward toward her groin with the right arm (the viewer's left) while reaching to the sky with her left. Focusing on a Western Cape site, the archaeological study is entitled 'A Cave with agency: Ochre, blood and women at Keurbos 4'. Citing Knight, Power and Watts, the authors provide suggestive evidence that this decorated cave may have been used as a conveniently secluded venue for performing women-only ceremonies connected with menstruation.

== See also ==
- Project Sheela
- Anasyrma
- Baubo
- Cailleach
- Dilukai
- Green Man
- Herma
- Lajja Gauri
- Vagina and vulva in art
- Venus figurine
