= Steirastoma coenosa =

Scientific classification
- Domain: Eukaryota
- Kingdom: Animalia
- Phylum: Arthropoda
- Class: Insecta
- Order: Coleoptera
- Suborder: Polyphaga
- Infraorder: Cucujiformia
- Family: Cerambycidae
- Genus: Steirastoma
- Species: S. coenosa

Binomial name
- Steirastoma coenosa Bates, 1862

Species of beetle

Steirastoma coenosa is a species of beetle in the family Cerambycidae. It was described by Henry Walter Bates in 1862.
