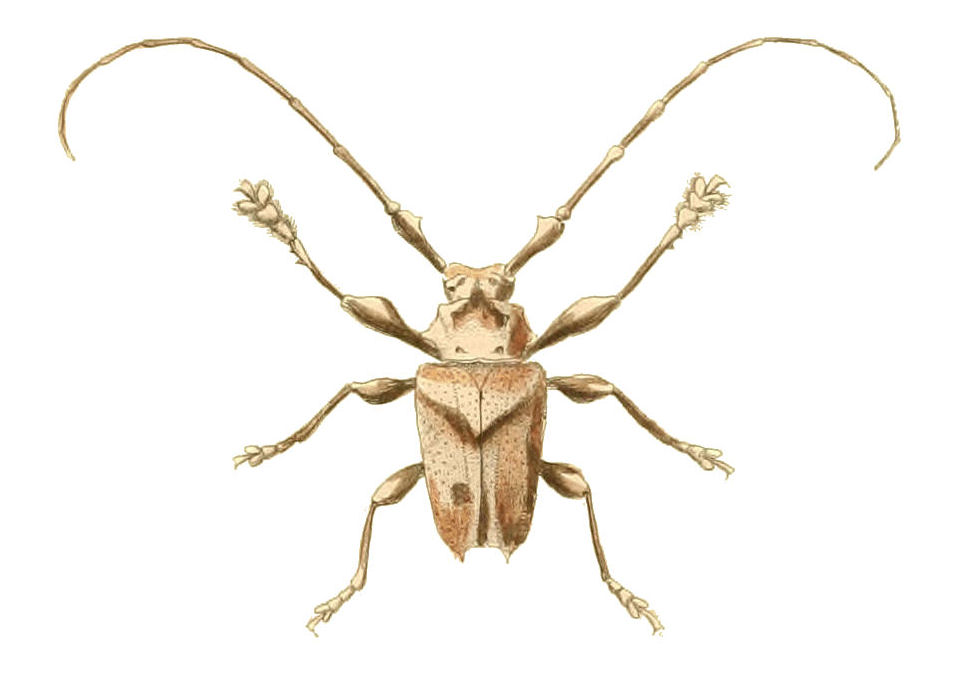

Scientific classification
- Domain: Eukaryota
- Kingdom: Animalia
- Phylum: Arthropoda
- Class: Insecta
- Order: Coleoptera
- Suborder: Polyphaga
- Infraorder: Cucujiformia
- Family: Cerambycidae
- Genus: Steirastoma
- Species: S. pustulata

Binomial name
- Steirastoma pustulata (Drury, 1773)

Synonyms
- Cerambyx pustulatus Drury, 1773; Cerambyx cancriformis Fabricius, 1775

= Steirastoma pustulata =

Species of beetle

Steirastoma pustulata is a species of beetle in the family Cerambycidae. It was described by Dru Drury in 1773 from Jamaica.

== Description ==
General colour grey brown. Head furnished with strong mandibles. Antennae (with the basal joint very thick) much longer than the insect. Thorax rough, gibbous, and full of small pustules, two of which form an obtuse spine on the sides. Scutellum small and triangular. Elytra margined, and full of small pustules, having two spines fixed at their extremity, near the suture. Forelegs long. Tibiae with a single spur. Femora clavate. Body length about 1 inch (25 mm).
