= Parazosmotes deceptor =

Scientific classification
- Kingdom: Animalia
- Phylum: Arthropoda
- Class: Insecta
- Order: Coleoptera
- Suborder: Polyphaga
- Infraorder: Cucujiformia
- Family: Cerambycidae
- Genus: Parazosmotes
- Species: P. deceptor

Binomial name
- Parazosmotes deceptor Holzschuh, 2009

Species of beetle

Parazosmotes deceptor is a species of beetle in the family Cerambycidae. It was described by Holzschuh in 2009.
