= Steirastoma zischkai =

Scientific classification
- Domain: Eukaryota
- Kingdom: Animalia
- Phylum: Arthropoda
- Class: Insecta
- Order: Coleoptera
- Suborder: Polyphaga
- Infraorder: Cucujiformia
- Family: Cerambycidae
- Genus: Steirastoma
- Species: S. zischkai

Binomial name
- Steirastoma zischkai Prosen, 1958

Species of beetle

Steirastoma zischkai is a species of beetle in the family Cerambycidae. It was described by Prosen in 1958.
