= Steirastoma genisspina =

Scientific classification
- Domain: Eukaryota
- Kingdom: Animalia
- Phylum: Arthropoda
- Class: Insecta
- Order: Coleoptera
- Suborder: Polyphaga
- Infraorder: Cucujiformia
- Family: Cerambycidae
- Genus: Steirastoma
- Species: S. genisspina

Binomial name
- Steirastoma genisspina Schwarzer, 1923

Species of beetle

Steirastoma genisspina is a species of beetle in the family Cerambycidae. It was described by Schwarzer in 1923.
