= Echo (mythology) =

Nymph in Greek mythology

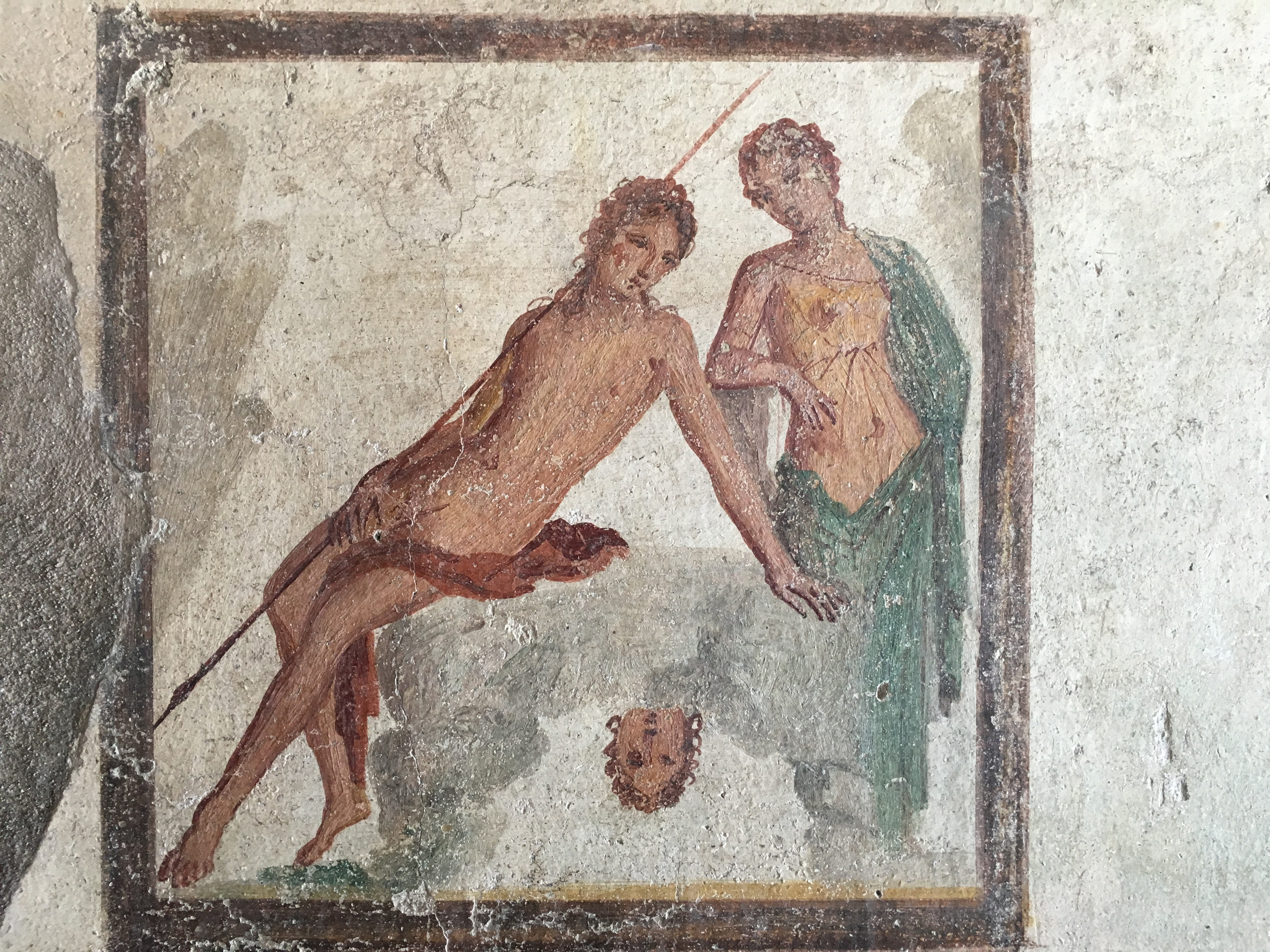
- Echo (right) with Narcissus, from a fresco in Pompeii
- Abode: Mount Cithaeron

Genealogy
- Children: Iynx and Iambe

In Greek mythology, Echo (/ˈɛkoʊ/; Greek: Ἠχώ, Ēkhō, "echo", from ἦχος (ēchos), "sound") was an Oread who resided on Mount Cithaeron. Zeus loved consorting with beautiful nymphs and often visited them on Earth. Eventually, Zeus's wife, Hera, became suspicious, and came from Mount Olympus in an attempt to catch Zeus with the nymphs. Echo protected her friends from Hera's wrath by distracting her with charming chatter while they escaped. When Hera realized what Echo had done, she punished her by taking away her ability to speak except for the last words spoken to her. When Echo met Narcissus and fell in love with him, she was unable to tell him how she felt and was forced to watch him as he fell in love with himself.

== Classical depiction ==
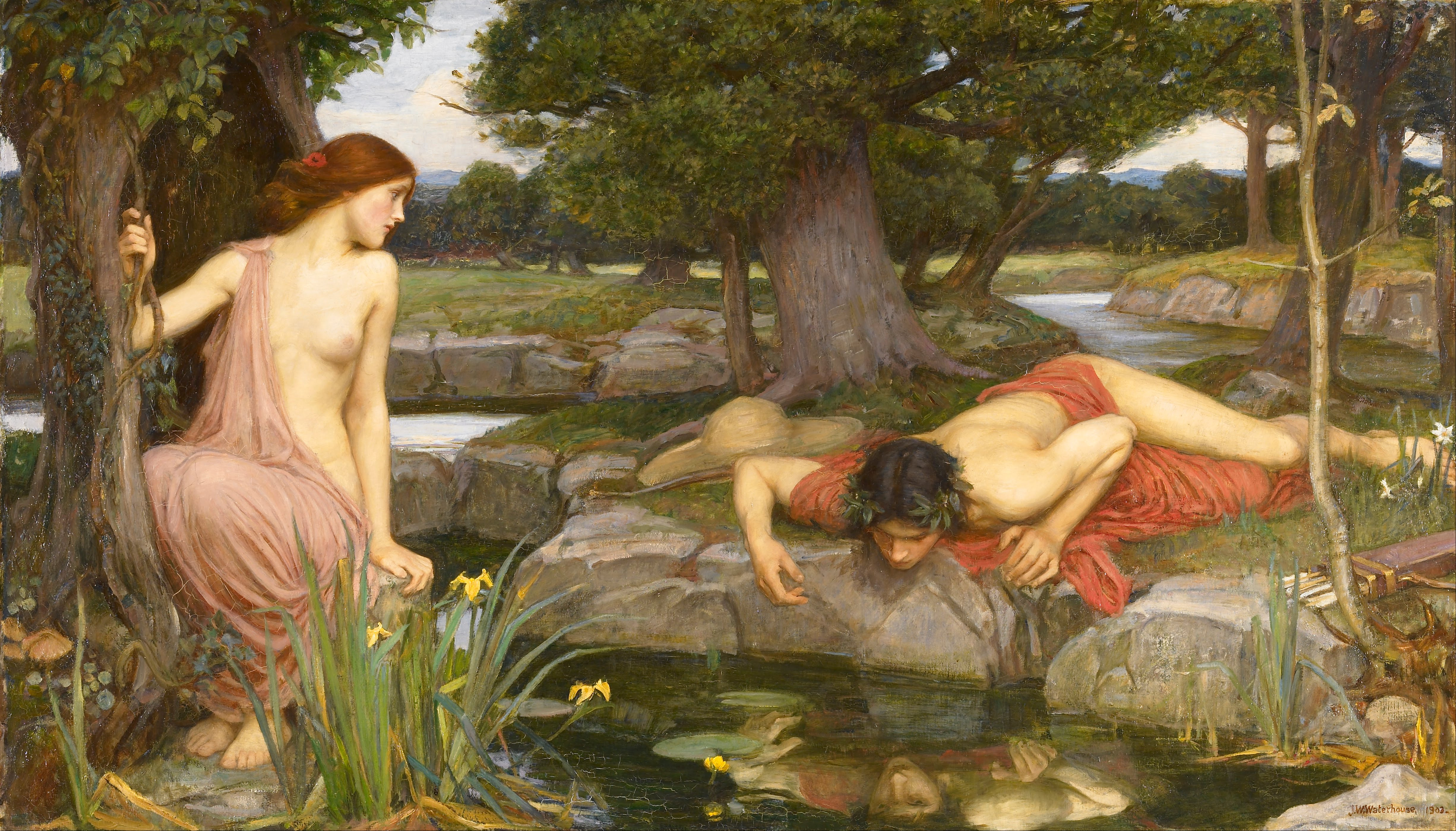
Echo and Narcissus (John William Waterhouse, 1903, Walker Art Gallery, Liverpool)

=== Metamorphoses ===
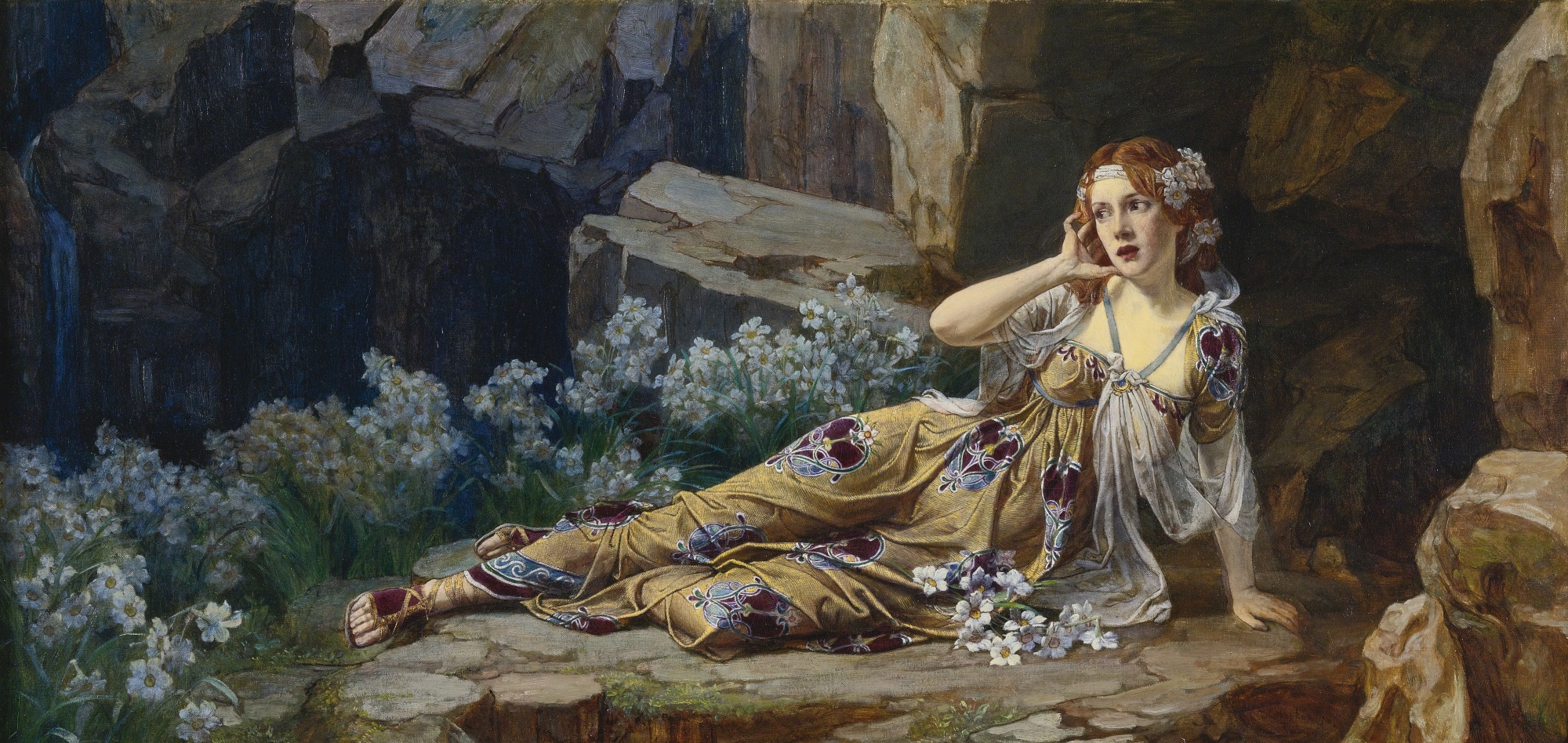
Echo (1900)

In Metamorphoses (8 AD), the poet Ovid tells of Juno (Hera in Greek mythology) and the jealousy she felt over her husband Jupiter's (Zeus in Greek mythology) many affairs. Though vigilant, whenever she was about to catch him, Echo distracted her with lengthy conversations. When at last Juno realized the truth, she cursed Echo. From that moment on, the once loquacious nymph could only repeat the most recently spoken words of another person.

Sometime after being cursed, Echo spied a young man, Narcissus, while he was out hunting deer with his companions. She immediately fell in love with him and, infatuated, followed quietly. The more she looked at the young man, the more she longed for him. Though she wished with all her heart to call out to Narcissus, Juno's curse prevented her.

During the hunt, Narcissus became separated from his companions and called out, "is anyone there" and heard the nymph repeat his words. Startled, Narcissus answered the voice, ‘come here,’ only to be told the same. When Narcissus saw that nobody had emerged from the glade, he concluded that the owner of the voice must be running away from him and called out again. Finally, he shouted, "This way, we must come together." Taking this to be a reciprocation of her love, Echo concurred ecstatically, "We must come together!"

In her delight, Echo rushed to Narcissus ready to throw her arms around her beloved. Narcissus, however, was appalled and, spurning her, exclaimed, ‘Hands off! May I die before you enjoy my body.’ All Echo could whisper in reply was, ‘enjoy my body’ and having done so she fled, scorned, humiliated, and shamed.

Despite the harshness of his rejection, Echo's love for Narcissus only grew. When Narcissus died, wasting away before his own reflection, consumed by a love that could not be, Echo mourned over his body. When Narcissus, looking one last time into the pool uttered, "Oh marvellous boy, I loved you in vain, farewell", Echo too chorused, "Farewell."

Eventually, Echo, too, began to waste away. Her beauty faded, her skin shrivelled, and her bones turned to stone. Today, all that remains of Echo is the sound of her voice.

=== Daphnis and Chloe ===
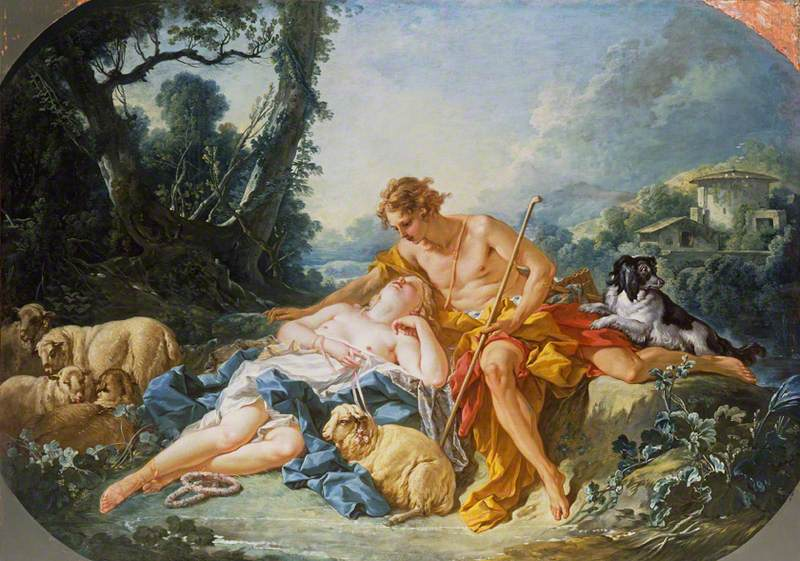
Daphnis recounting the tale of Echo to Chloe. (François Boucher, 1743, The Wallace Collection, London)

The tale of Daphnis and Chloe is a 2nd-century romance by Greek author Longus. At one point in the novel, Daphnis and Chloe are staring out at the boats gliding across the sea. Chloe, having never heard an echo before, is confused on hearing the fisherman's song repeated in a nearby valley. Daphnis promises to tell her the story of Echo in exchange for ten more kisses.

Daphnis’ rendition differs radically from Ovid's account. According to Daphnis, Echo was raised among the Nymphæ because her mother was a nymph. Her father, however, was merely a man and hence Echo was not herself a nymph but mortal. Echo spent her days dancing with the Nymphae and singing with the Muses who taught her all manner of musical instruments. Pan then grew angry with her, envious of her musical virtuosity and covetous of her virginity, which she would yield neither to men nor gods. Pan drove the men of the fields mad, and, like wild animals, they tore Echo apart and scattered the still singing fragments of her body across the earth.

Showing favour to the Nymphae, Gaia hid the shreds of Echo within herself providing shelter for her music and at the Muses’ command, Echo's body will still sing, imitating with perfect likeness the sound of any earthly thing. Daphnis recounts that Pan himself often hears his very own pipes and, giving chase across the mountains, looks in vain for the secret student he can never find.

Echo appears in a small but notable body of Greco-Roman visual art, most often it has to do with scenes illustrating her unrequited love for Narcissus. One of the best-known examples of this would be the Pompeian fresco from the House of Marcus Lucretius Fronto, where Echo stands slightly behind Narcissus as he gazes into a pool of water. Scholars note that her marginal placement and softer rendering may reflect the diminishing physical presence described in Metamorphoses. In Attic vase paintings of the 5th and 4th centuries BCE, Echo is similarly portrayed as an Oread integrated into the natural landscape, sometimes emerging from rock formations or tree lines to evoke her association with mountains and her eventual dissipation into voice.

Literary and mythological scholarship further emphasizes Echo's liminal status in both visual and textual tradition. Segal argues that Echo's artistic marginalization mirrors her narrative transformation into a figure of repetition and disappearance. Hardie similarly interprets Echo's fading presence in art and literature as part of Ovid's broader poetics of illusion and bodily dissolution. Modern museum catalogues, such as the Getty Museum's exhibition on the Narcissus myth, note that contemporary artists frequently reinterpret Echo as a symbol of lost voice, emotional distance, and the erasure of women's agency.

Across these works, Echo is consistently positioned as a liminal figure present within the composition yet visually receding mirroring her mythological transformation from embodied nymph to disembodied sound.

=== Other ===
Both the Homeric Hymn and Orphic Hymn to Pan reiterate Longus' tale of Pan chasing Echo's secret voice across the mountains.

Codex 190 of Photius' Bibliotheca states that Pan's unrequited love for Echo was placed there by Aphrodite, angry at his verdict in a beauty contest.

Nonnus' Dionysiaca contains a number of references to Echo. In Nonnus' account, though Pan frequently chased Echo, he never won her affection. Book VI also makes reference to Echo in the context of the Great Deluge. Nonnus states that the waters rose so far that even high on the hills Echo was forced to swim. Having escaped the advances of Pan, she feared now the lust of Poseidon.

Whereas Nonnus is adamant that Pan never wins Echo, in Apuleius' The Golden Ass Pan is described with Echo in his arms, teaching the nymph to repeat all manner of songs. Similarly in the Suda, Echo is described as bearing Pan a child, Iynx. Other fragments mention a second daughter, Iambe.

== Medieval depiction ==
Harrison describes how medieval European writers transformed Echo from a nymph into a mortal noblewoman, adapting her story to explore themes of courtly love, desire, and pride. These retellings often used Echo to comment on human emotion and social conduct within aristocratic culture.

=== The Lay of Narcissus ===
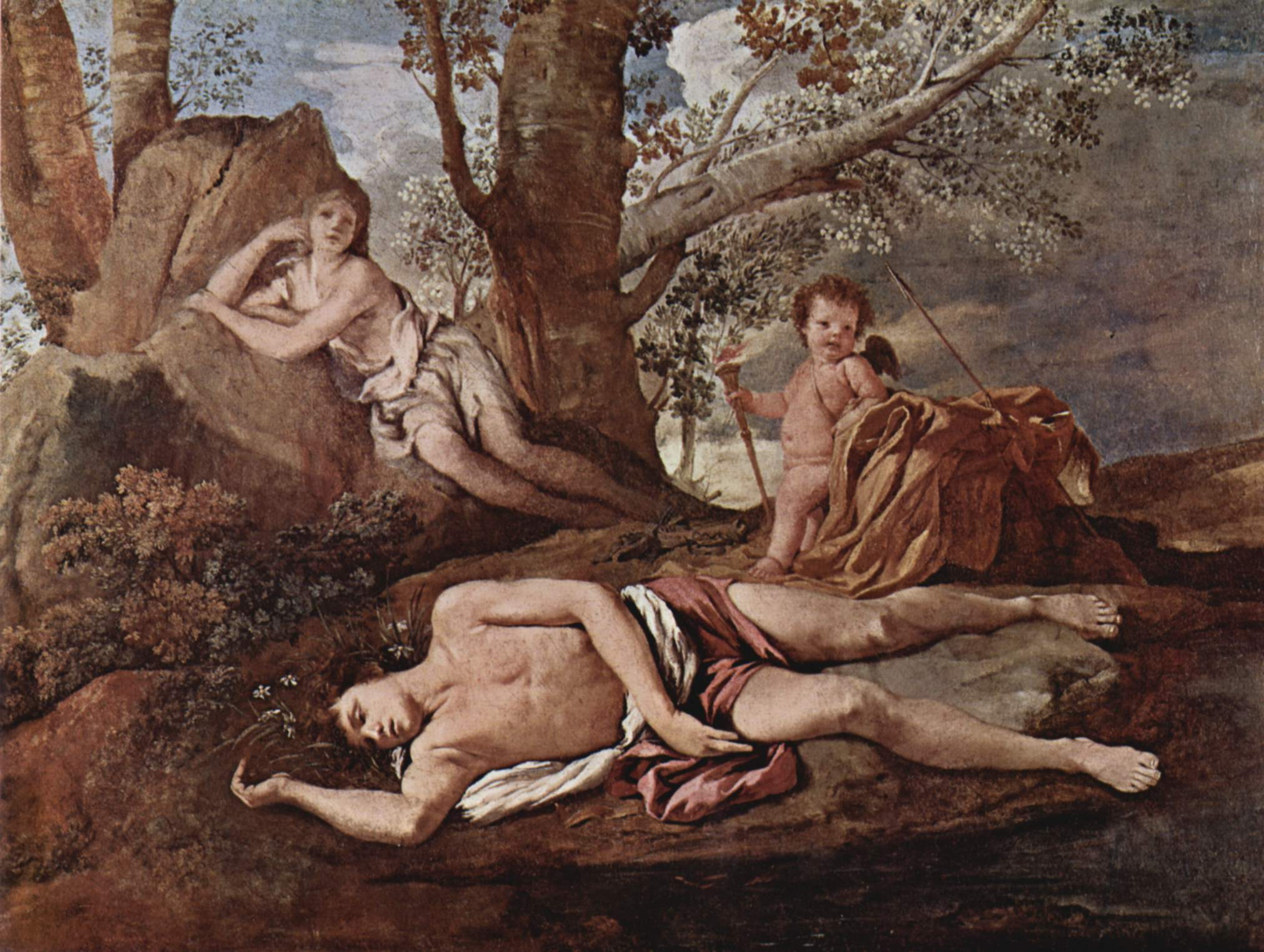
Echo and Narcissus, a depiction of Echo and Narcissus featuring Cupid and his arrows. (Nicolas Poussin, 1630, Louvre Museum, Paris)

The Lay of Narcissus, one of many titles by which the work is known, is a Norman-French verse narrative written towards the end of the 12th century. In the four manuscripts that remain, an unknown author borrows from the Echo and Narcissus of Ovid to create a story better suited to the needs of his time.

This medieval account alters the characters of both Echo and Narcissus. In Ovid's account Echo is a beautiful nymph residing with the Muses, and Narcissus is a haughty prince. In The Lay of Narcissus, Echo is replaced by the princess Dané. Conversely, Narcissus loses the royal status he bore in Ovid's account: in this rendition he is no more than a commoner, a vassal of Dané's father, the King.

In the Lay, Dané is pierced by the arrows of Amor and falls madly in love with Narcissus. Though aware that she should first consult her father, she nonetheless shares her feelings with Narcissus. Despite her emphasising her royal lineage, Narcissus spurns her just as he spurns and flees from all women.

Humiliated, Dané calls out to Amor, and, in response, the god curses Narcissus. In a classic example of poetic justice, Narcissus is forced to suffer the same pain he inflicted on others, namely the pain of unrequited love. The vehicle of this justice is a pool of water in which Narcissus falls in love with his own reflection, which he at first mistakes for a woman. Deranged by lust, Dané searches for Narcissus, naked but for a cloak, and finds him at the point of death. Devastated, Dané repents ever calling to Amor. Dané expresses her love for the last time, pulls close to her beloved and dies in his arms. The poet warns men and women alike not to disdain suitors lest they suffer a similar fate.

While Ovid's story is still recognisable, many of the details have changed considerably. Almost all references to pagan deities are gone, save Amor who is little more than a personification of love. Narcissus is demoted to the status of a commoner while Echo is elevated to the status of princess. Allusions to Narcissus’ homosexuality are expunged. While Ovid talks of Narcissus' disdain for both male and female suitors, the Lay only mentions his hatred of women. Similarly, in the Lay, Narcissus mistakes his reflection for that of a woman, whereas no mention is made of this in Ovid's account. Finally, the tale is overtly moralized with messages about courtly love. Such exhortations were entirely absent from the Metamorphoses rendition.

=== The Romance of the Rose ===
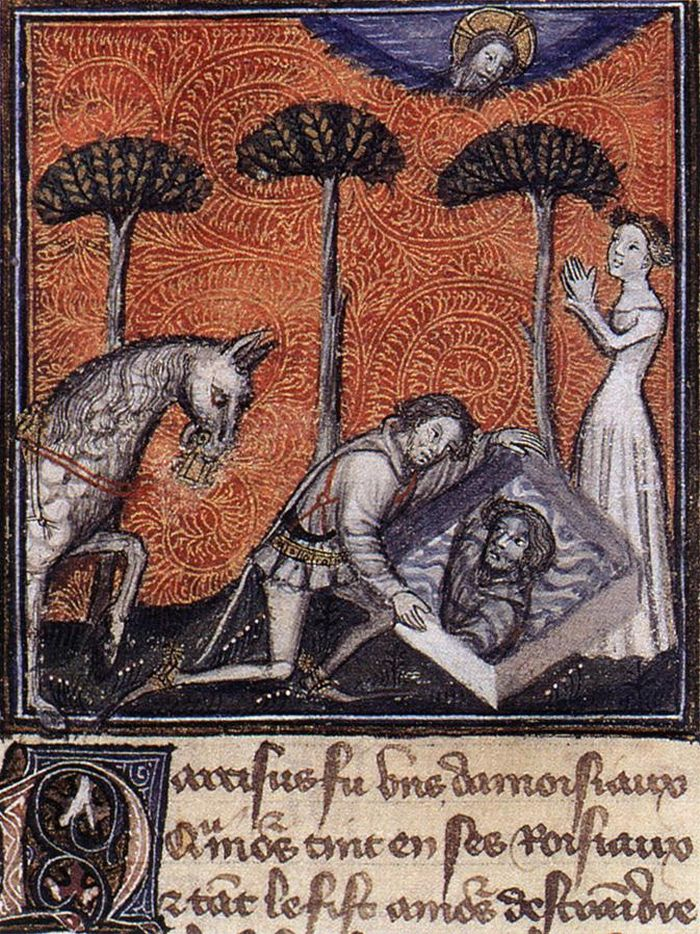
An early illustration of the Spring of Narcissus from The Romance of the Rose

The Romance of the Rose is a medieval French poem, the first section of which was written by Guillaume de Lorris in around 1230. The poem was completed by Jean de Meun in around 1275. Part of a much larger narrative, the tale of Echo and Narcissus is relayed when the central figure stumbles across the pool wherein Narcissus first glimpsed his own reflection.

In this rendition, Echo is not a nymph, or a princess, but a noble lady. She fell madly in love with Narcissus, so much so that she declared that she would die should he fail to love her in turn. Narcissus refuses, not because he despises all women, but merely because he is haughty and excessively proud of his own beauty.

Guillaume relays that on hearing Narcissus’ rejection, Echo's grief and anger were so great that she died at once. However, in a similar vein to the Lay of Narcissus, just before she dies, Echo calls out to Deus. She asks that Narcissus might one day be tormented by unrequited love as she had been, and, in so doing, understand how the spurned suffer.

As in the classical myth, Narcissus comes across a pool following a hunt. Though Echo prayed to Deus, and the tale notes that he answered her prayer, it is Amor who waits for Narcissus by the water. Amor causes Narcissus to fall for his own reflection, leading quickly to his death. The tale makes clear that this is not merely justice for Echo, but also punishment for Narcissus’ slight against love itself.

The tale concludes with an exhortation to all men warning them that, should they scorn their lovers, God will repay the offence.

Guillaume's rendition builds on the themes of courtly love emphasised in the Lay and moves further away from Ovid's initial account. The curse of Hera is absent entirely, and the tale is overtly moralised. Unlike in the Lay, however, this moral message is aimed solely at women; this despite the fact that the offending behaviour is perpetrated by Narcissus not Echo.

== Legacy ==
=== Modern terminology ===
Echo's name is the source of several medical and psychiatric terms. Athanasiadis notes that “echolalia” and “echopraxia,” conditions involving the involuntary repetition of words or actions, derive from her role in myth as a nymph who could only repeat others’ speech.

== Symbolism and influence ==
Graziani identifies Ovid's Metamorphoses as the most influential literary version of the Echo myth. She notes that Echo symbolizes revelation through repetition, functioning as a figure whose voice exposes or reflects hidden truths. Graziani also highlights Echo's influence on early modern European literature, especially in the development of the “echo dialogue,” a poetic form that relies on repeated syllables to create ironic or layered meanings.

== Sources ==
- Athanassakis, Apostolos N., The Homeric Hymns, Johns Hopkins University Press, 1976. ISBN 978-0-801-81792-2. Internet Archive.
- Brill's New Pauly: Encyclopaedia of the Ancient World. Antiquity, Volume 10, Obl – Phe, edited by Hubert Cancik and Helmuth Schneider, Brill, 2007. ISBN 9789004142152.
