= Steirastoma meridionale =

Scientific classification
- Domain: Eukaryota
- Kingdom: Animalia
- Phylum: Arthropoda
- Class: Insecta
- Order: Coleoptera
- Suborder: Polyphaga
- Infraorder: Cucujiformia
- Family: Cerambycidae
- Genus: Steirastoma
- Species: S. meridionale

Binomial name
- Steirastoma meridionale Aurivillius, 1908

Synonyms
- Steirastoma depressum Heyne & Taschenberg 1906; Steirastoma heros Colas 1952

Species of beetle

Steirastoma meridionale is a species of beetle in the family Cerambycidae. It was described by Per Olof Christopher Aurivillius in 1908.
