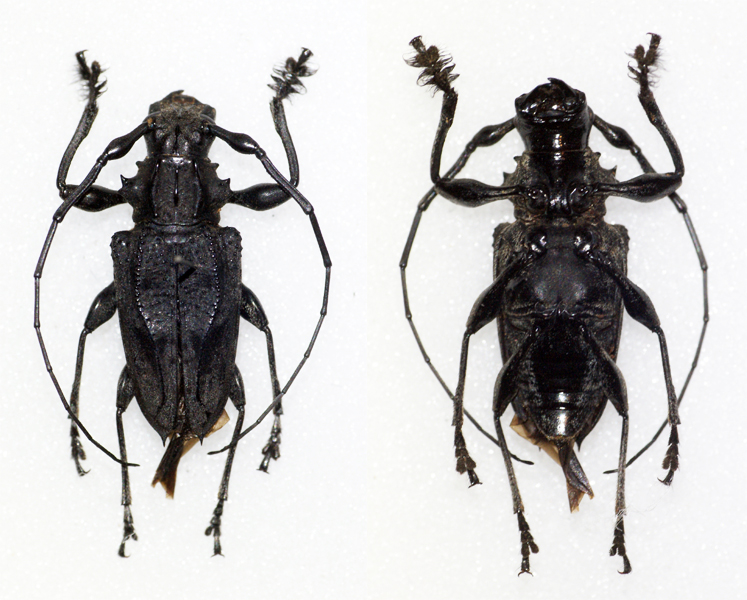

Scientific classification
- Domain: Eukaryota
- Kingdom: Animalia
- Phylum: Arthropoda
- Class: Insecta
- Order: Coleoptera
- Suborder: Polyphaga
- Infraorder: Cucujiformia
- Family: Cerambycidae
- Genus: Steirastoma
- Species: S. aethiops

Binomial name
- Steirastoma aethiops Bates, 1862

= Steirastoma aethiops =

Species of beetle

Steirastoma aethiops is a species of beetle in the family Cerambycidae. It was described by Henry Walter Bates in 1862.
