= Anasyrma =

Culturally framed gesture of lifting the skirt or kilt

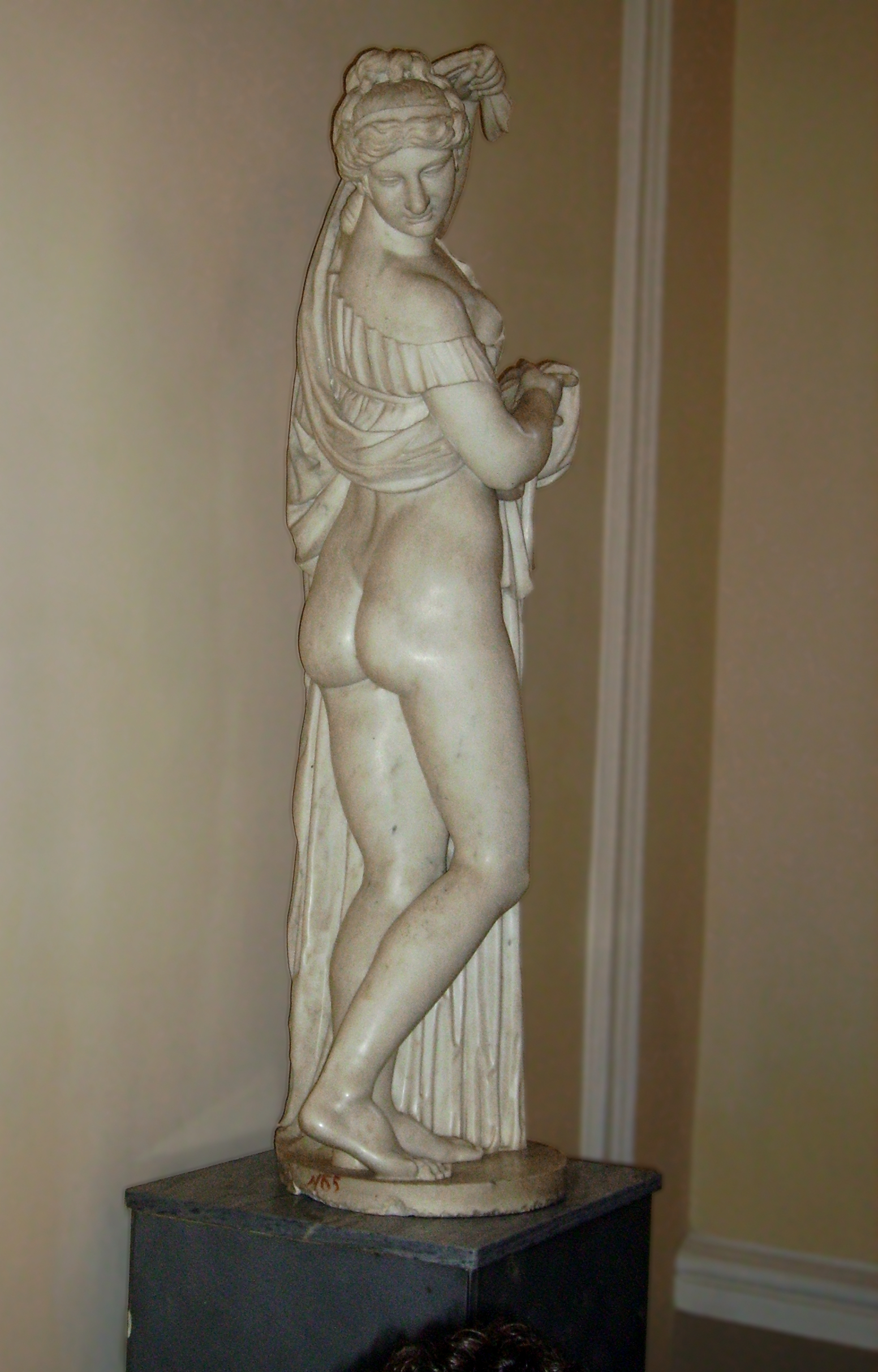
Copy of a Hellenistic Aphrodite Kallipygos at The Hermitage in St. Petersburg

Anasyrma (Ancient Greek: ἀνάσυρμα, composed of ἀνά ana 'up, against, back' and σύρμα syrma 'a dragging motion'; plural anasyrmata ἀνασύρματα), also called anasyrmos (ἀνασυρμός), is the gesture of lifting the skirt or kilt. It is used in connection with certain religious rituals, eroticism, and lewd jokes (see, for example, Baubo). The term is used in describing corresponding works of art.

Anasyrma may be a deliberately provocative self-exposing of one's naked genitals or buttocks. The famous example of the latter case is Aphrodite Kallipygos ("Aphrodite of the beautiful buttocks"). In other contexts, this gesture has an apotropaic character, that is, a means to ward off a supernatural enemy, or it may be a sign of mockery, analogous to mooning.

== Greek antiquity ==
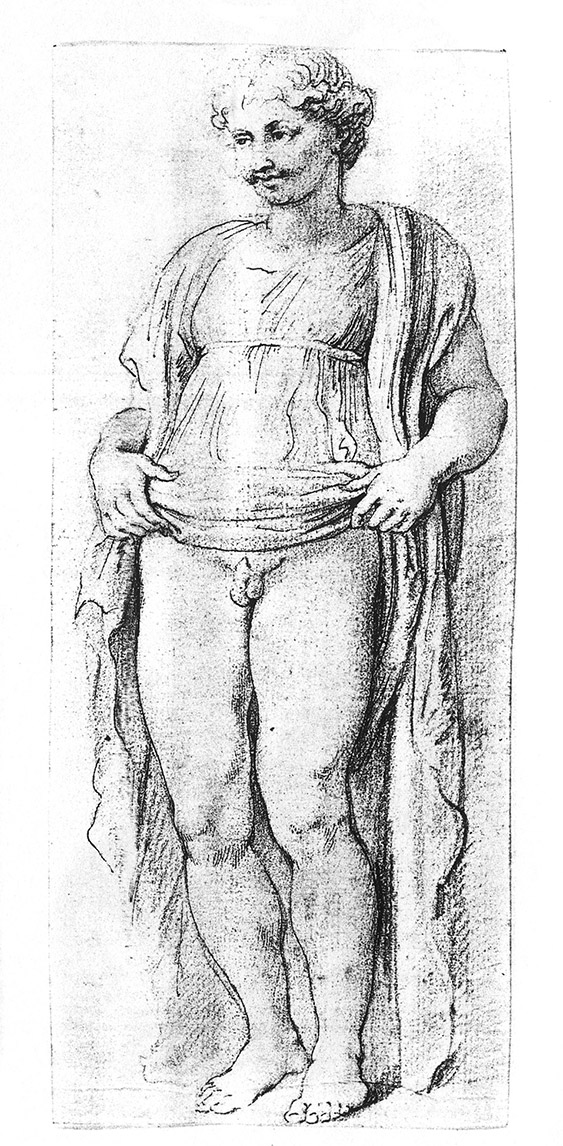
Hermaphrodite anasyromenos sketch by Peter Paul Rubens

Ritual jesting and intimate exposure were common in the cults of Demeter and Dionysus, and figure in the celebration of the Eleusinian Mysteries associated with these divinities. The mythographer Apollodorus says that Iambe's jesting was the reason for the practice of ritual jesting at the Thesmophoria, a festival celebrated in honor of Demeter and Persephone. In other versions of the myth of Demeter, the goddess is received by a woman named Baubo, a crone who makes her laugh by exposing herself, in a ritual gesture called anasyrma ("lifting [of skirts]"). A set of statuettes from Priene, a Greek city on the west coast of Asia Minor, are usually identified as "Baubo" figurines, representing the female body as the face conflated with the lower part of the abdomen. These appeared as counterparts to the phalluses decorated with eyes, mouth, and sometimes legs, that appeared on vase paintings and were made as statuettes.

Terracotta hermaphrodite figurines in the so-called anasyromenos pose, with breasts and a long garment lifted to reveal a phallus, have been found from Sicily to Lesbos, dating back to the late Classical and early Hellenistic period. The anasyromenos pose, however, was not invented in the 4th century BCE; figures of this type drew on a much earlier eastern iconographic tradition employed for female divinities. Ancient literature suggests that the figures represent the androgynous Cypriot deity Aphroditus (possibly a form of Astarte), whose cult was introduced into mainland Greece between the 5th and 4th centuries BCE. The revealed phallus was believed to have apotropaic magical powers, averting the evil eye or invidia and bestowing good luck.

== Apotropaic effect of nakedness ==
Many historical references suggest that anasyrma had dramatic or supernatural effect—positive or negative. Pliny the Elder wrote that a menstruating woman who uncovers her body can scare away hailstorms, whirlwinds and lightning. If she strips naked and walks around a field of wheat, caterpillars, worms and beetles fall off the heads. Even when not menstruating, she can lull a storm out at sea by stripping.

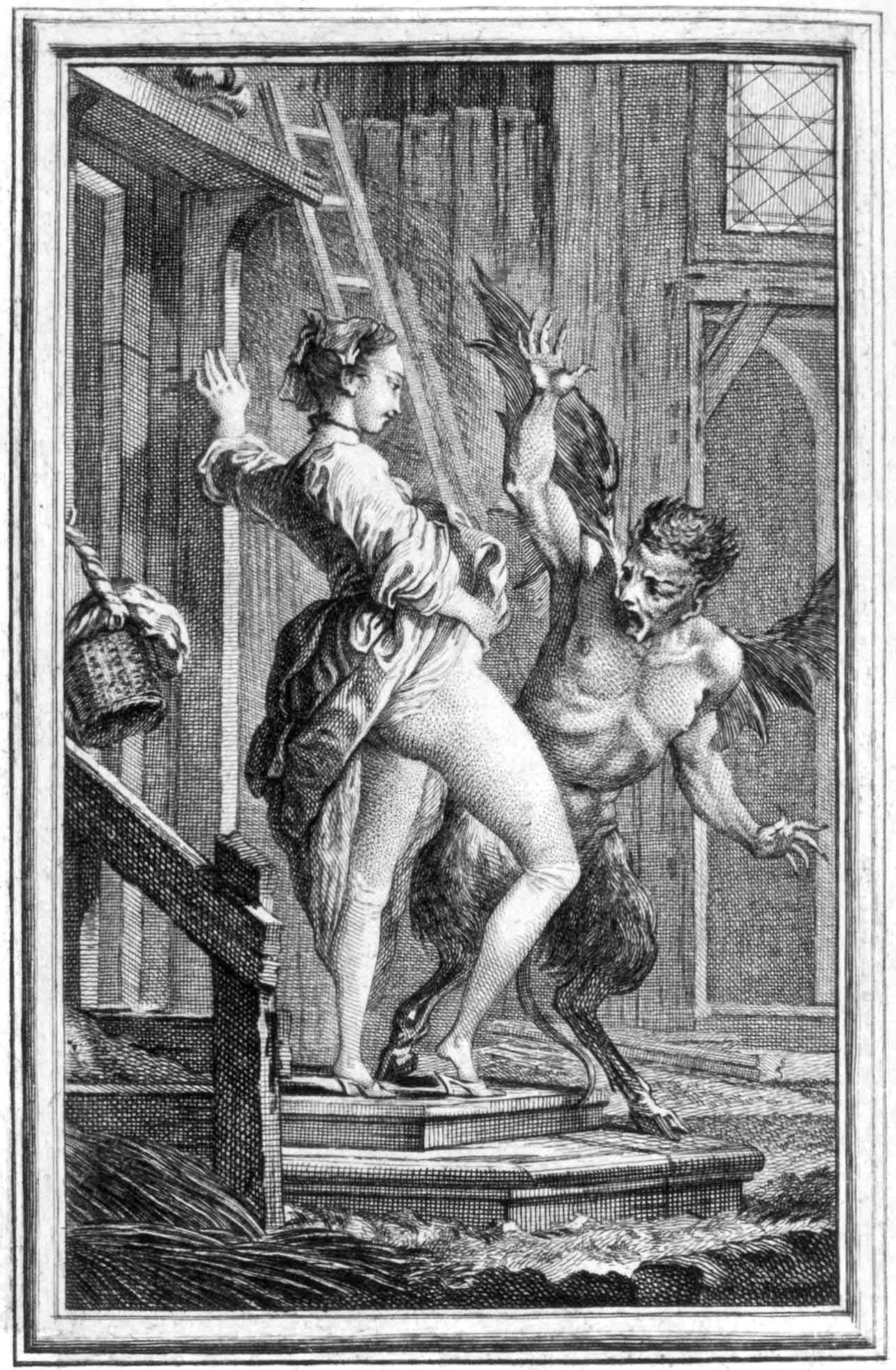
La Fontaine's "The Devil of Pope-Fig Island", illustrated by Charles Eisen (c. 1762)

According to folklore, women lifted their skirts to chase off enemies in Ireland and China. A story from The Irish Times (September 23, 1977) reported a potentially violent incident involving several men, which was averted by a woman exposing her genitals to the attackers. According to Balkan folklore, when it rained too much, women would run into the fields and lift their skirts to scare the gods and end the rain. Maimonides also mentions this ritual to ward off the rain while expressing his disapproval. Stripping away clothing was perceived as creating a "raw" state closer to nature than society, facilitating interaction with supernatural entities. In Jean de La Fontaine's Nouveaux Contes (1674), a demon is repulsed by the sight of a woman lifting her skirt. Associated carvings, called sheela na gigs, were common on medieval churches in northern Europe and the British Isles.

In some nations of Africa, a woman stripping naked and displaying herself is still considered a curse and a means to ward off evil.

In Nigeria in 2002, during mass protests against the petroleum industry, women threatened to disrobe; this led ChevronTexaco, wishing to avoid the shame this gesture would bring on the company in the eyes of local residents, to strike a deal with the community to provide needed services.

In 2003, Leymah Gbowee threatened to strip naked to prevent being arrested as she and other women surrounded the courtroom where peace negotiations were taking place during the Second Liberian Civil War. The warlords and generals at the negotiating table, fearing the curse that would befall them should they witness her nakedness, retreated back to the conference room. The women maintained their protest for two more weeks, until the negotiations finally reached a peace settlement, an episode depicted in the 2008 documentary film Pray the Devil Back to Hell.

== See also ==
- Can-can – Music-hall dance
- Exhibitionism (Martymachlia)
- Indecent exposure – Public indecency involving nudity
- Mooning – Display of the buttocks
- Nudity and protest – Use of the nude human form to further political or social change
- Pantsing – Act of pulling down a person's trousers
- Upskirt – Image taken under a person's skirt

== Sources ==
- Marilyn A. Katz (February 13, 2000). "CCIV 110 / Spring 2000 / Women in Ancient Greece: Background Notes: Homeric hymn to Demeter". Wesleyan University. Archived from the original on July 29, 2010.
- Weber-Lehmann, C. (1997/2000)) "Anasyrma und Götterhochzeit. Ein orientalisches Motiv im nacharchaischen Etrurien", in: Akten des Kolloquiums zum Thema: Der Orient und Etrurien. Zum Phänomen des 'Orientalisierens' im westlichen Mittelmeerraum. Tübingen.
- Dexter, Miriam Robbins, and Victor H. Mair. (2010) Sacred Display: Divine and Magical Female Figures of Eurasia. Cambria Press. ISBN 9781604976748
