= Steirastoma thunbergi =

Scientific classification
- Domain: Eukaryota
- Kingdom: Animalia
- Phylum: Arthropoda
- Class: Insecta
- Order: Coleoptera
- Suborder: Polyphaga
- Infraorder: Cucujiformia
- Family: Cerambycidae
- Genus: Steirastoma
- Species: S. thunbergi

Binomial name
- Steirastoma thunbergi Thomson, 1865

Species of beetle

Steirastoma thunbergi is a species of beetle in the family Cerambycidae. It was described by Thomson in 1865.
