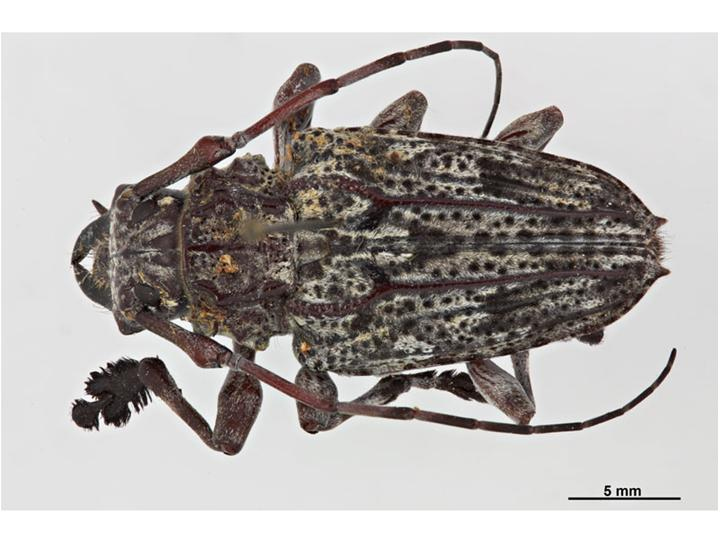
- Steirastoma breve

Scientific classification
- Domain: Eukaryota
- Kingdom: Animalia
- Phylum: Arthropoda
- Class: Insecta
- Order: Coleoptera
- Suborder: Polyphaga
- Infraorder: Cucujiformia
- Family: Cerambycidae
- Subfamily: Lamiinae
- Genus: Steirastoma

Synonyms
- Stirastoma Gemminger & Harold 1873

= Steirastoma =

Genus of beetles

Steirastoma is a genus of beetles in the family Cerambycidae, containing the following species:

- Steirastoma acutipenne Sallé, 1856
- Steirastoma aethiops Bates, 1862
- Steirastoma albiceps Bates, 1872
- Steirastoma anomala Bates, 1880
- Steirastoma breve (Sulzer, 1776)
- Steirastoma coenosa Bates, 1862
- Steirastoma genisspina Schwarzer, 1923
- Steirastoma histrionica White, 1855
- Steirastoma liturata Bates, 1885
- Steirastoma lycaon Pascoe, 1866
- Steirastoma marmorata (Thunberg, 1822)
- Steirastoma melanogenys White, 1855
- Steirastoma meridionale Aurivillius, 1908
- Steirastoma poeyi Chevrolat, 1862
- Steirastoma pustulata (Drury, 1773)
- Steirastoma senex White, 1855
- Steirastoma stellio Pascoe, 1866
- Steirastoma thunbergi Thomson, 1865
- Steirastoma zischkai Prosen, 1958
