= Synelasma baramensis =

Scientific classification
- Kingdom: Animalia
- Phylum: Arthropoda
- Clade: Pancrustacea
- Class: Insecta
- Order: Coleoptera
- Suborder: Polyphaga
- Infraorder: Cucujiformia
- Family: Cerambycidae
- Genus: Synelasma
- Species: S. baramensis

Binomial name
- Synelasma baramensis Heyden, 1897

Species of beetle

Synelasma baramensis is a species of beetle in the family Cerambycidae. It was described by Heyden in 1897. It is known from Sumatra and Borneo.
