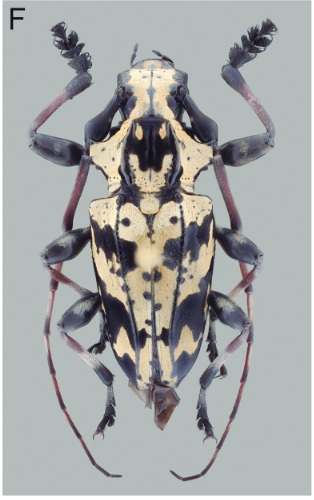

Scientific classification
- Kingdom: Animalia
- Phylum: Arthropoda
- Clade: Pancrustacea
- Class: Insecta
- Order: Coleoptera
- Suborder: Polyphaga
- Infraorder: Cucujiformia
- Family: Cerambycidae
- Genus: Steirastoma
- Species: S. marmorata

Binomial name
- Steirastoma marmorata (Thunberg, 1822)

Synonyms
- Trachyderes marmoratus Thunberg, 1822; Steirastoma lacerta Laporte 1840; Steirastoma manuelata Germar 1824

= Steirastoma marmorata =

Species of beetle

Steirastoma marmorata is a species of beetle in the family Cerambycidae. It was described by Carl Peter Thunberg in 1822. It is found in Brazil (Bahia, Minas Gerais, Espirito Santo, Rio de Janeiro, São Paulo, Paraná, Santa Catarina, Rio Grande do Sul), Paraguay, Argentina and Uruguay.
