= Parazosmotes =

Scientific classification
- Kingdom: Animalia
- Phylum: Arthropoda
- Class: Insecta
- Order: Coleoptera
- Suborder: Polyphaga
- Infraorder: Cucujiformia
- Family: Cerambycidae
- Tribe: Pteropliini
- Genus: Parazosmotes

Genus of beetles

Parazosmotes is a genus of longhorn beetles of the subfamily Lamiinae, containing the following species:

- Parazosmotes deceptor Holzschuh, 2009
- Parazosmotes scincus (Pascoe, 1865)
