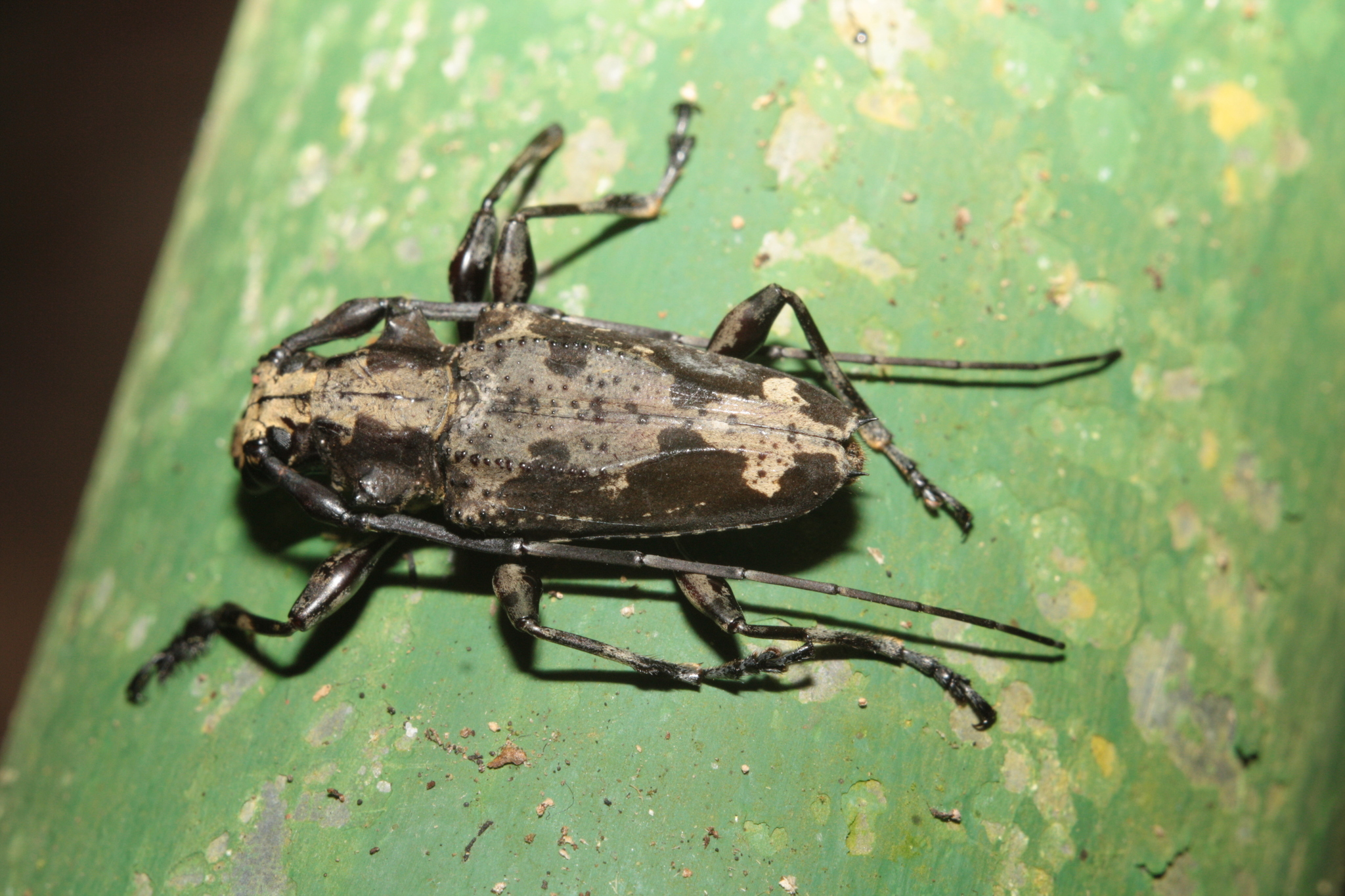

Scientific classification
- Kingdom: Animalia
- Phylum: Arthropoda
- Class: Insecta
- Order: Coleoptera
- Suborder: Polyphaga
- Infraorder: Cucujiformia
- Family: Cerambycidae
- Genus: Steirastoma
- Species: S. albiceps

Binomial name
- Steirastoma albiceps Bates, 1872

= Steirastoma albiceps =

Species of beetle

Steirastoma albiceps is a species of beetle in the family Cerambycidae. It was described by Henry Walter Bates in 1872.
