= Project Sheela =

Irish feminist street art project

Project Sheela is an Irish contemporary street art project that places ceramic sheela-na-gig plaques at sites connected to the history of women's rights. It was started in 2020 by two anonymous women artists based in Dublin, Ireland. New plaques are installed each year on and around International Women's Day. Most sites are in Dublin, with later plaques placed in Cork and Tullamore.

== Background ==
Sheela-na-gigs are medieval stone carvings of naked figures displaying exaggerated genitalia. They are found across Europe, with the largest number in Ireland. Their original meaning is disputed. Proposed interpretations include a warning against lust, a protective talisman and a fertility figure. The artists described modern feminists as having adopted the sheela as a symbol of female power and sexuality. They cited the campaign to repeal the Eighth Amendment as an inspiration for the project.

== History ==
The first plaque was placed at the Forty Foot in Sandycove in March 2020. It marked a 1974 protest in which women swam at what had been a men-only bathing place. Sixteen plaques were installed in Dublin that year.

In 2021 the artists placed seven plaques, one each day during the week of International Women's Day, beginning on 8 March. Details of each site were published on the project's Instagram account. The Guardian reported that year that COVID-19 restrictions had kept the project in Dublin, and that the artists intended to extend it to other cities.

By 2025, the project's sixth year, sites outside Dublin included the former Bessborough Mother & Baby Home in Cork and the banks of the Grand Canal in Tullamore, where Ashling Murphy was murdered in 2022.

== Sites ==
Sites are chosen for their connection to women's rights in Ireland, past and present. The artists said that art placed in the right context can be more powerful, and that they aimed to link historical events with issues that remain unresolved. Issues addressed include reproductive rights, maternity care, domestic violence, migrant rights and image-based sexual abuse.

Sites have included:

- the former Magdalene laundries in Donnybrook and on Sean McDermott Street
- the former registered offices of Pornhub at City Quay
- the headquarters of Transgender Equality Network of Ireland (TENI)
- the head office of the Department of Health, in recognition of women who died of cervical cancer, which the artists attributed to failings by the Health Service Executive
- Trinity College Dublin, honouring Noël Browne and the Mother and Child Scheme
- the offices of the Dublin Rape Crisis Centre

Plaques have also commemorated Hanna Sheehy-Skeffington, Constance Markievicz and Rosie Hackett, a founding member of the Irish Women Workers' Union.

== Design and production ==
One of the two artists is a ceramicist and the other a street artist. Each plaque is hand-sculpted from stoneware clay, dried, and fired in a kiln at 1,000 °C. Glass is placed inside the glazed vulva, which melts during a second firing at 1,250 °C. 22-carat gold is then painted around the opening and fired at 800 °C. On some pieces a reaction between the glass and iron in the clay produces a rust-coloured ring.

Each plaque differs in details such as hair, eyes, ears and tongue. The artists said the variation in the vulvas was intended to reflect variation in real life. The making process is documented on the project's Instagram account.

=== Artist anonymity ===
The artists have not disclosed their identities. They told RTÉ that anonymity allowed the project to "belong to everyone" and become more of a movement. In 2025 they said it kept the project from becoming about a particular artist.

== Reception ==
The artists described the online response as largely positive. The Dublin Rape Crisis Centre brought its plaque indoors and displays it in its hallway. The plaque at TENI was removed within days of installation.

A plaque on Waterloo Road, historically part of Dublin's red-light district, was accompanied by a post criticising Escort Ireland, a website hosting reviews of sex workers. The post drew negative responses. The artists said they supported the Nordic model, which criminalises the purchase but not the sale of sex.

== Funding ==
The project is funded through sales of plaques and merchandise. The artists donate 10 per cent of money raised to charity. Recipients have included Saoirse Women's Refuge, the Dublin Rape Crisis Centre, the Sexual Violence Centre Cork and Women's Aid. In 2024 donations went to the Palestine Red Crescent Society and Médecins Sans Frontières.
