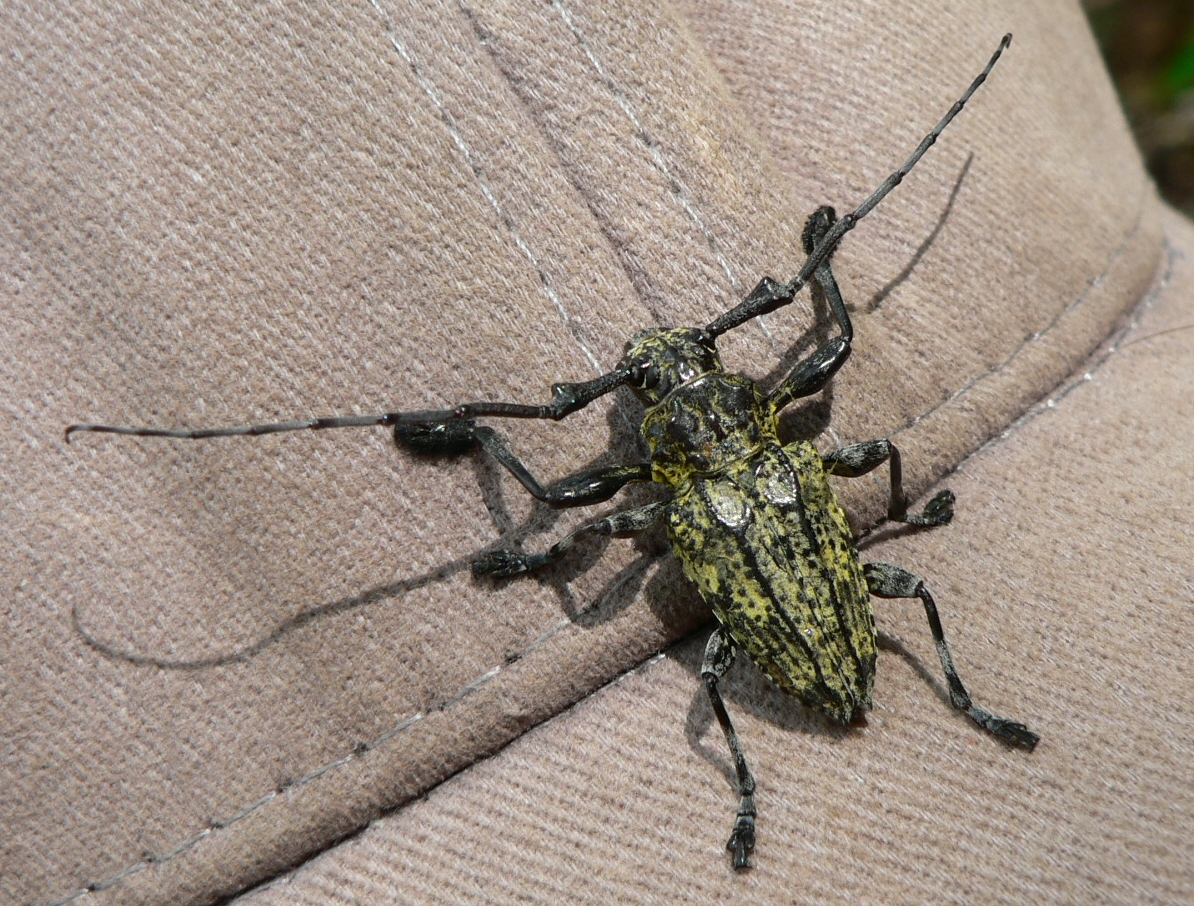

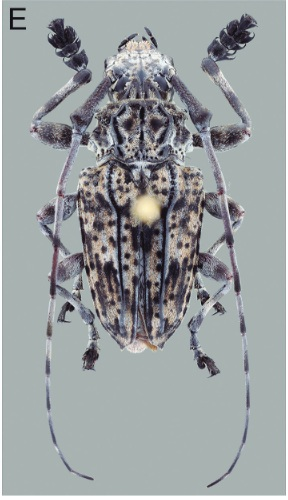

Scientific classification
- Kingdom: Animalia
- Phylum: Arthropoda
- Clade: Pancrustacea
- Class: Insecta
- Order: Coleoptera
- Suborder: Polyphaga
- Infraorder: Cucujiformia
- Family: Cerambycidae
- Genus: Steirastoma
- Species: S. breve

Binomial name
- Steirastoma breve (Sulzer, 1776)

Synonyms
- Cerambyx Brevis Sulzer, 1776; Cerambyx depressus Fabricius, 1781; Cerambyx carinatus Voet, 1781 (Unav.)

= Steirastoma breve =

Species of beetle

Steirastoma breve is a species of beetle in the family Cerambycidae. It was described by Sulzer in 1776. It is found in Guatemala, Grenada, Jamaica, Martinique, Puerto Rico, Saint Lucia, Trinidad and Tobago, Ecuador, Colombia, Venezuela, Peru, Suriname, French Guiana, Bolivia, Brazil, Paraguay and Argentina.
