= Synelasma =

Scientific classification
- Kingdom: Animalia
- Phylum: Arthropoda
- Class: Insecta
- Order: Coleoptera
- Suborder: Polyphaga
- Infraorder: Cucujiformia
- Family: Cerambycidae
- Subfamily: Lamiinae
- Tribe: Pteropliini
- Genus: Synelasma; Pascoe, 1858

Genus of beetles

Synelasma is a genus of longhorn beetles of the subfamily Lamiinae, containing the following species:

- Synelasma anolius Pascoe, 1865
- Synelasma baramensis Heyden, 1897
- Synelasma bufo Pascoe, 1858
- Synelasma stellio Pascoe, 1865
