= Synelasma stellio =

Scientific classification
- Kingdom: Animalia
- Phylum: Arthropoda
- Class: Insecta
- Order: Coleoptera
- Suborder: Polyphaga
- Infraorder: Cucujiformia
- Family: Cerambycidae
- Genus: Synelasma
- Species: S. stellio

Binomial name
- Synelasma stellio Pascoe, 1865

Species of beetle

Synelasma stellio is a species of beetle in the family Cerambycidae. It was described by Francis Polkinghorne Pascoe in 1865. It is known from Borneo.
