= Baubo =

Female character from Greek mythology

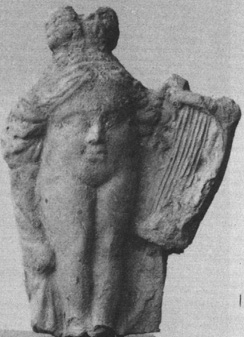
A Baubo terracotta figurine of the Priene type, holding a lyre. From Priene, Anatolia.

Baubo (Ancient Greek: Βαυβώ) is a minor figure in Greek mythology who does not appear in surviving sources before the fourth century BCE. A fragment from Asclepiades of Tragilus states that she is the wife of Dysaules, who was said to be autochthonous; that they had two daughters, Protonoe and Misa; and that the couple welcomed Demeter into their house.

The fifth century CE Greek grammarian Hesychius recorded the name Baubo in his lexicon, stating that she was the nurse of Demeter. He gives the meaning of the word as 'hollow' or 'stomach' (κοιλίαν, koilian), citing the fifth century BCE philosopher Empedocles as a source.

It is very likely that the story of Baubo is an etiological myth explaining certain rites and rituals of the Eleusinian Mysteries.

== Eleusinian Mysteries ==
Baubo is mentioned in two Orphic fragments – fragments 52 and 49 – relating to the Eleusinian mysteries and specifically the cheering of Demeter during her stay at Eleusis as she mourns the loss of her daughter. In fragment 49, Baubo is the name of the mother of Demophon — a mortal child whom Demeter unsuccessfully attempts to turn immortal by anointing him with ambrosia and placing him nightly in the fire. In other sources Demophon is the son of the King of Eleusis, Celeus, and his queen, Metanira. This suggests that in fragment 49 Baubo is the queen of Eleusis. In this fragment, when Baubo sees what Demeter is doing, she cries out in fear. In response Demeter burns the child to death.

In fragment 52, Demeter stays at Eleusis and mourns the loss of her daughter Persephone, who had been abducted by Hades, and Baubo makes her laugh through an act of anasyrma. In other sources such as the Homeric Hymn to Demeter the role of cheering Demeter up is filled by a slave named Iambe, who does so by making jokes.

Fragment 52 is preserved in the Protrepticus of Clement of Alexandria, written in the second century CE, who presents the fragment as proof of the depravity of the Eleusinian Mysteries and Greek religion more generally. The context he provides for the quote is that Demeter had rested at Eleusis during her search for her daughter, and Baubo, treating her as a guest, had offered her food and wine. Demeter refused these due to her mourning; the rejection of hospitality was perceived as a slight by Baubo who responded by showing her genitals. However, Baubo's actions are usually interpreted as an attempt to cheer Demeter up, rather than a response to a slight, based on the corresponding scene in The Homeric Hymn to Demeter. Ralph Rosen sees the act as an attempt to cheer Demeter up specifically by mocking her, as is also the case with Iambe. Rosen also notes, however, that no one would have understood this as serious, or contemptuous mockery of the goddess.

Baubo was worshipped along with Demeter and Persephone on the island of Paros. Evidence from inscriptions indicates that she had cult status at Naxos and in Dion (Macedonia) as well as in Paros in connection with Demeter and Kore.

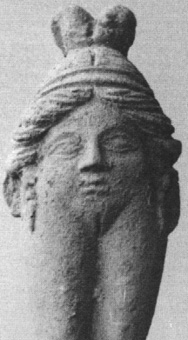
A face-in-body Baubo figurine

== Baubo figurines ==
The name Baubo is given to several different types of figurine, most of them terracotta. The oldest type of figurine given this label is the Priene type, so named because of examples found at the Sanctuary of Demeter and Kore at Priene. These date from the third to second century BCE and depict the naked lower part of a female body with a face where the abdomen should be, with the curve of the chin merging into the vulva. The arms are placed at ear level and carry attributes (torches, lyre, basket of fruit carried on the head). These were probably votive offerings, and were made locally.

The second type of Baubo figurine comes from Egypt, and is split into two groups. The first group depicts a woman seating frontally on a large pig, whilst holding a musical instrument. In some of these figurines her right hand is touching her genitalia. The second group depicts a woman crouching on the ground, holding her legs apart. The genitalia are always very apparent, and many of these figurines were used as amulets.

Elements that appear on some of the figurines of this type, such as a lotus crown and sistrum, along with the fact that they were produced in Egypt, has led scholars to suggest that these are votive offerings to Isis from women asking for fertility or from pregnant women wanting to give birth soon. Thus, despite the name, there is no reason to assume that these figures are supposed to depict the Baubo from Greek myth, though the connection cannot be ruled out.

== See also ==
- Anasyrma
- Dilukai
- Headless men
- Lajja Gauri
- Nin-imma
- Sheela na gig
- Vagina and vulva in art
- Venus figurines
- Ame-no-Uzume

== Bibliography ==
- Clement of Alexandria (1919). The Exhortation to the Greeks. Translated by Butterworth, G. W. Harvard University Press.
- Graf, Fritz (2011). "Baubo". Brill's New Pauly. Brill.
- Halliwell, Stephen (2008). Greek Laughter: A Study of Cultural Psychology from Homer to Early Christianity. Cambridge University Press.
- Hesychius (1867). Lexicon. Jena, Germany: Sumptibus Hermanni Dufftii.
- Jacoby, Felix (1957). Die Fragmente der griechischen Historiker. Brill.
- Karaghiorga-Stathacopoulou, Théodora (1986). "Baubo". Lexicon Iconographicum Mythologiae Classicae III-1 Atherion-Eros. Artemis & Winkler Verlag.
- Kern, Otto (1922). Orphicorum fragmenta. Weidmann.
- Marcovich, M. (1 January 1986). "Demeter, Baubo, Iacchus, and a Redactor". Vigiliae Christianae. 40 (3): 294–301. doi:10.2307/1583904. JSTOR 1583904.
- Richardson, Nicholas (1974). The Homeric Hymn to Demeter. Clarendon Press.
- Rosen, Ralph (2007). Making Mockery: The Poetics of Ancient Satire. Oxford University Press.
- O' Higgins, Laurie (2003). Women and Humor in Classical Greece. Cambridge, UK; New York: Cambridge University Press.
