= Lajja Gauri =

Lotus-headed Hindu goddess associated with abundance, fertility and sexuality

Lajjā Gaurī is a lotus-headed Hindu goddess associated with abundance, fertility and sexuality, sometimes euphemistically described as Lajja ("modesty"). She is sometimes shown in a birthing posture, but without outward signs of pregnancy.

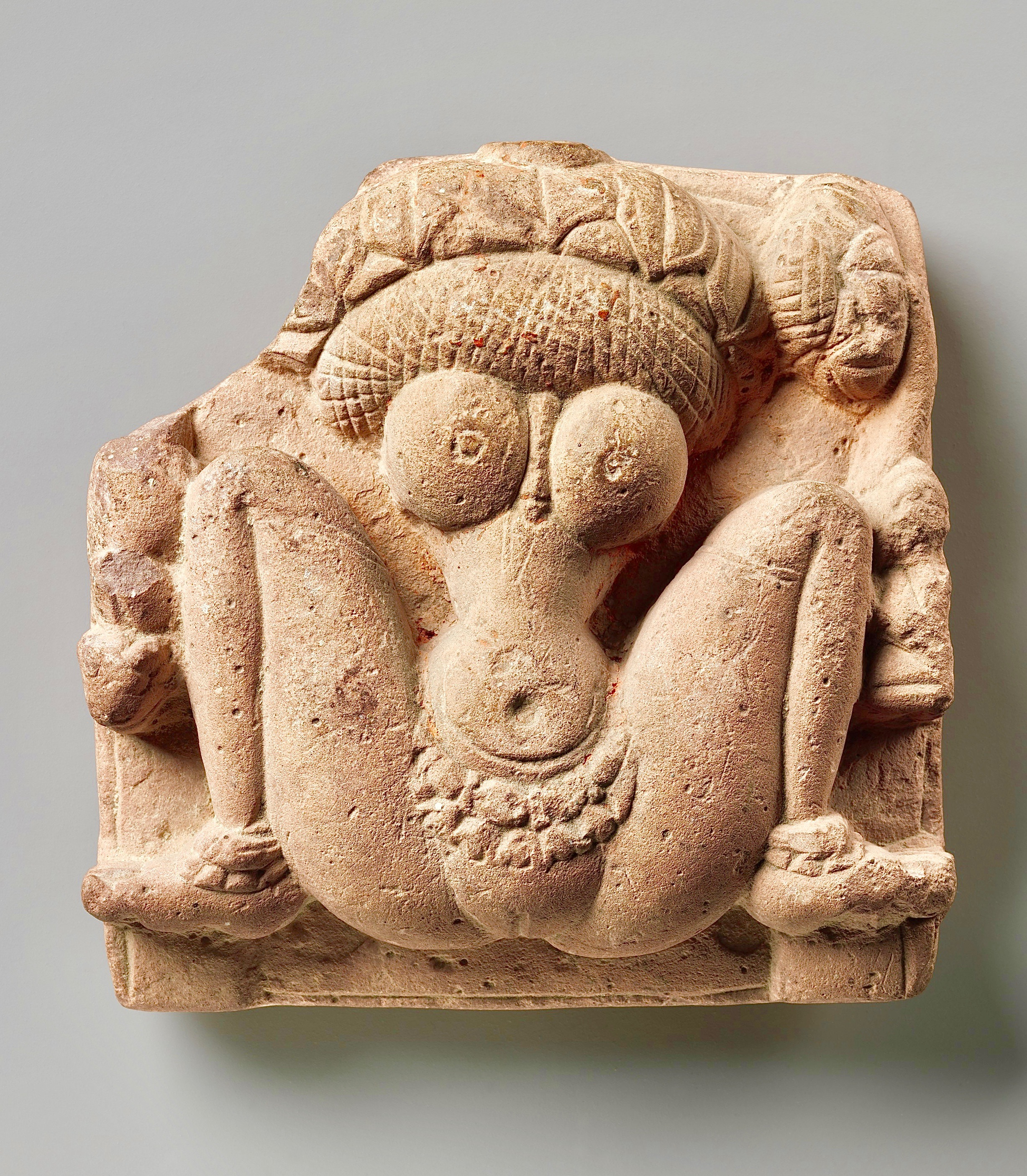
6th century CE Lajja Gauri relief from Madhya Pradesh

== History ==
Early depictions of Lajja Gauri in Shaktism were found in the Indus Valley seals, though her later depiction dates to the 1st-3rd centuries, and her worship is prevalent in the Deccan Plateau, a region of the Indian subcontinent.

== Iconography ==
Her fertility aspect is emphasized by symbolic representation of the genitals, yoni or the womb, as a blooming lotus flower denoting blooming youth in some cases and in others through a simple yet detailed depiction of an exposed vulva. She is sitting in a squatting position (malasana) with legs open, as in during childbirth, in some cases, the right foot is placed on a platform to facilitate full opening. She is invoked for abundant crops (vegetative fertility) and good progeny. A blossoming lotus replaces her head and neck, an icon often used in Tantra. The seven chakras of human energy anatomy are often depicted as blossoming lotuses, and the goddess is often depicted in her Sri Yantra as a yoni, shown as a simplified triangle at the centre. This is a feature present in all the Kohbar Mithila paintings which are worshipped by newlyweds in a Maithil wedding.

Further, most fertility goddesses of the ancient world are similarly shown headless, while giving prominent focus to the genitals. The arms of the goddess are bent upwards, each holding a lotus stem, held at the level of the head again depicted by the matured lotus flower.

Owing to an absence of verifiable text in Vedic traditions on the iconography, she does not seem to hold any exalted position in Hindu pantheon, despite her strong presence throughout India, especially in the tribal region of Bastar in Central India and downwards to the South. The goddess is sometimes called Lajja Gauri, interpreted by some as the Innocent Creatrix, the Creator deity or at times simply "Headless Goddess", or Aditi Uttanapada by modern archeologist, academicians and Indologists.

The majority of the terracotta figurines were carved in the Gupta and post-Gupta periods.

== Worship ==
Icons of Lajja Gauri have been found in different villages, and local people identify her with other goddesses such as Aditi, Adya Shakti, Renuka and Yellamma. A notable sculpture of her dating to 150-300 CE was found at Amravati (now kept at State Museum, Chennai), Tribal areas of Central India, Andhra Pradesh, Karnataka, where the town of Badami, known for the Badami cave temples, has a sculpture of the deity preserved at the local Archeological Museum, originally found in Naganatha Temple, Naganathakolla, Bijapur District, and has an extant temple dedicated to the goddess in Badami Chalukya architecture, within the town precincts dating to the Chalukya dynasty which flourished around the 6th century AD. Maithili people worship Lajja Gauri during the marriage. She is an integral part of the Kohbar Mithila Painting which is kept in the nuptial chamber of newly weds.

Another arguable interpretation by Dr. Ramachandra C. Dhere in his book entitled Lajja Gauri is that Lanja/Lanjika means 'naked', which reminds us of the geographical area in Konkan (Maharashtra), called Lanja.

== Symbolism and Hinduisation ==
The pose in which the Indian goddess Lajja Gauri is depicted is known as the uttanapad pose. Her head is substituted by a full-bloomed lotus flower. During the 19th century, when the British archaeologists discovered these images for the first time, they were shocked by the indecent eroticism and the shamelessness of such nude representations. The squatting, life-sized nudes were in stark contrast to their Victorian idea of decent morality and femininity. However, that was a classic case of conundrum born out of two distinct cultures interacting with each other. In Indian art and aesthetics, the Gauri's uttanapada pose, that is how she sits with her knees bent and legs drawn up to the sides of her abdomen, signifies creation. Therefore, Lajja Gauri, as her name lajja suggests, represents modesty. She is an aspect of Gauri, that is a form of Parvati, the consort of Shiva, who is modest and shy, directly opposite to the interpretations of British archeologists who labelled these images as a nude–heathen representation of eroticism.

This Gauri image is always associated with distinct symbols that connote the idea of fortune and fertility, explicitly signifying her powers. The three major symbols are: the Lotus, the Brimming Pot and the Srivastava. The lotus in Indian art styles connotes creation, fertility and fortune. It symbolizes an intergenerational transference of the reproductive potential and stands for the cyclical journey of life. The brimming pot resembles the yoni or the womb. The overflowing pot is similar to the image of cornucopia suggesting affluence and abundant creative potential. Moreover, the arrangement of the torso, the large breasts, and the flower buds flanking the bloomed lotus on the head are similar to the purna kalasha design popular in all Hindu rituals and festivals since the Vedic times. The Srivastava in Indian art suggests a notion of creative fullness and fortune. It is usually depicted with a triangle, cross-shaped flower, or whorl-shaped arrangement. This juxtaposed metaphors of the lotuses and srivastavas could also be found at Bhahrut and Sanchi. A comparison could be made with the form of the Lajja Gauri. Carol Bolon does such a reading. The Srivatsava highlights her affinity to Lakshmi and her various forms, such as Sri and Gajalakshmi. Like Lajja Gauri, all these are also goddesses of well-being and prosperity.

The image of the goddess, and her worship, originated in tribal areas and/or local villages. She was a gramadevi, revered in her aniconic form. Mature images of her anthropomorphic forms can be seen in the Elephanta Caves (dated 500 CE), in the Ellora Caves (dated 550 CE), and throughout Gujarat during the 6th and 7th centuries. These mature representations hint at the beginning of her induction in the Brahminical fold of worship. Her Hinduisation paved the way for her entry into the temples, and slowly, even her mythological imagination also changed. She began to be associated with Shiva, was given a vahana, namely Shakti's lion, and was gradually merged into the image of the goddess. She was also shown with Shiva's bull Nandi and his aniconic form as the Lingam. In Andhra Pradesh, in various plaques and lintels, her image could be spotted with other major Hindu deities. One of the major contributing factors to Lajja Gauri's transformation from an esoteric personfied representational image to a full-fledged Hindu goddess was royal patronage, particularly the attention extended to her by the Chalukya kings.

The quality and the quantity of the production of her images during the Early Chalukya rule suggests her popularity, and the royal patronage she enjoyed during the period. In many temples, dating back to the time, these images continue to be worshipped. This presents before us a continuous contemporary framework in which to locate this goddess. Temples like Telangana's Bala Brahma Temple, and the Lakulisa Temple at Karnataka, are some famous examples. These temples are frequented by childless women, couples, and newlyweds, seeking for fertility and power of procreation. They worship the goddess with ghee, powders, and flowers and perform the pradakshina around the sanctum sanctorum.

== See also ==
- Kamakhya
- Dilukai
- Sheela na gig
- Baubo
- Ninimma
