= Steirastoma stellio =

Scientific classification
- Domain: Eukaryota
- Kingdom: Animalia
- Phylum: Arthropoda
- Class: Insecta
- Order: Coleoptera
- Suborder: Polyphaga
- Infraorder: Cucujiformia
- Family: Cerambycidae
- Genus: Steirastoma
- Species: S. stellio

Binomial name
- Steirastoma stellio Pascoe, 1866

Species of beetle

Steirastoma stellio is a species of beetle in the family Cerambycidae. It was described by Pascoe in 1866.
