= Iambe =

Tracian mythological character

Iambe (Ancient Greek: Ἰάμβη means 'banter'), in Greek mythology, was a Thracian woman, daughter of Pan and Echo, granddaughter of Hermes, and a servant of Metaneira, the wife of Hippothoon. Others call her a slave of Celeus, king of Eleusis.

== Mythology ==
The extravagant hilarity displayed at the festivals of Demeter in Attica was traced to her, for it is said that when Demeter, in her wanderings in search of her daughter, arrived in Attica, Iambe cheered the mournful goddess with her jokes.

Till Iambe, who was knowing and careful, placed for her
A fixed seat, and draped a bright-shining fleece over it.
There she sat down, and held a veil in front of her.
For a long time she sat on the couch without speaking, sorrowing,
Nor did she embrace anyone in word or deed,

But without laughing and not tasting food or drink
She sat wasting away in longing for her deep-girdled daughter,
Till Iambe, who was knowing and careful, with jests
Made many jokes and turned the mood of the divine lady,
By smiling and laughing, and keeping her heart gracious:
So she pleased the goddess afterwards with her kindly temperament.

Iambe was believed to have given the name to iambic poetry, for some said that she hanged herself in consequence of the cutting speeches in which she had indulged, and others that she had cheered Demeter by a dance in the Iambic metre.

== See also ==
- Baubo
- The Lay of Narcissus
