= Haloa =

Festival in honour of Demeter / Persephone

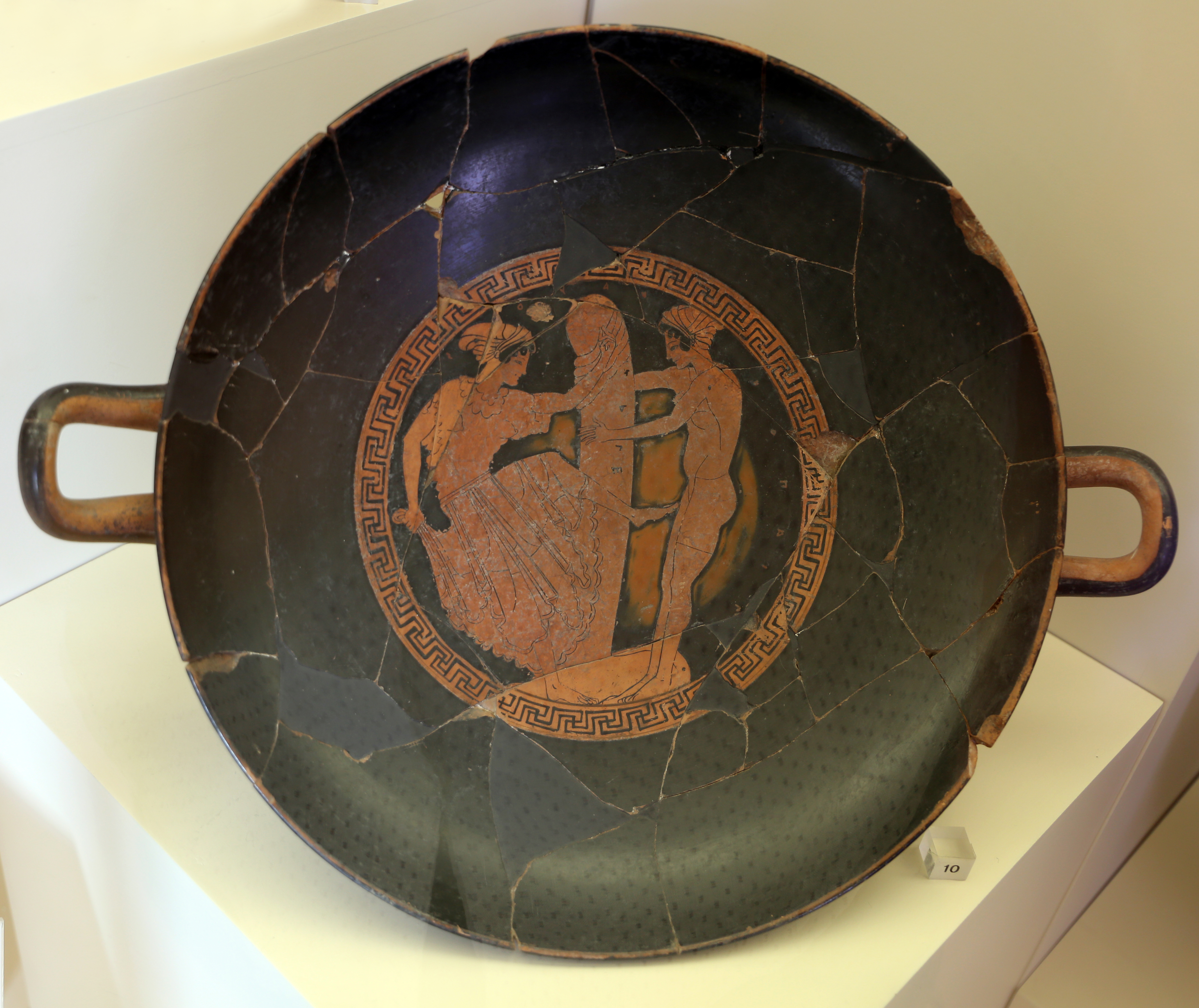
Hetairai at Haloa festival dancing around a giant phallus (Oedipus Painter, 480 BC)

Haloa or Alo (Ἁλῶα) was an Attic festival, celebrated principally at Eleusis, in honour of Demeter (Δήμητρα, η Αλωαίη), protector of the fruits of the earth, of Dionysus, god of the grape and of wine, and Poseidon (Ποσειδώνας ο Φυτάλμιος), god of the seashore vegetation. In Greek, the word hálōs (ἅλως) from which Haloa derives means "threshing-floor" or "garden." While the general consensus is that it was a festival related to threshing—the process of loosening the edible part of cereal grain after harvest—some scholars disagree and argue that it was instead a gardening festival. Haloa focuses mainly on the "first fruits" of the harvest, partly as a grateful acknowledgement for the benefits the husbandmen received, partly as prayer that the next harvest would be plentiful. The festival was also called Thalysia or Syncomesteria.

== The festival ==
Haloa took place every year, during the month Poseideon (Ποσειδέωνας), after the first harvest was over. The festival took place around the threshing floor (αλώνια) at the same time throughout Attica. All women were expected to attend this event, but men were almost always excluded. Men had a legal and moral expectation to pay for their wives' expenses in these festivities. The strange timing of the harvest festival—mid-winter—is significant as well. The Greeks regarded the festival as sacred to not only Demeter but also to Dionysus. With the inclusion of Dionysus in the festival worship, the date shifted towards the winter as "he possessed himself of the festivals of Demeter, took over her threshing-floor and compelled the anomaly of a winter threshing festival." In many ways, the festival was just as connected, if not more so, with Dionysus than with Demeter. Thus, we see the power and influence of the incoming god and of the importance of wine to Greek cult activity. Practically, Greeks were able to coax out a harvest just early enough to revel with Dionysus.

Despite being amongst the most documented of Greek festivals, very few records of what exactly occurred during Haloa. Because it was a predominantly, if not exclusively, women's festival, little information has survived, or was recorded at all, about its characteristics and rituals. In fact, one of the most detailed sources of Haloa actually consists of marginal notes from the 13th century AD on the Roman writer Lucian's works. According to these notes, the women's ritual practices involved "pits, snakes, pigs, and models of genitalia, all of which have a more or less marked sexual significance." We also know that the festival "is said to have comprised Mysteries of Demeter, Persephone, and Dionysus." Another source singled out these women's festivals as "containing the germ of 'Mysteries,'" referencing here the Eleusinian Mysteries—annual initiation ceremonies devoted to the cult of Demeter and Persephone.

== Rituals ==
As Dionysus, whose festivals are held in wintertime, necessarily shifted the date of Haloa to late December/early January, so too did he shift festival rituals towards the celebration of grapes and wine. Rituals were often conducted by women during the "pruning of the vines and the tasting of the wine" as it is around this time of year that the soil around the vineyards are cut and hoed, and the first fermentation cycle completed. Some texts state that this element of the festival was instituted after the death of the shepherd Icarius (or Ikarios), after he introduced the vine into Attica. The myth has it that Dionysus presented Icarius with the gift of wine as thanks for his hospitality. However, when Icarius shared this gift with his shepherd friends, they mistook the signs of drunkenness as signs of poison, and killed Icarius in retaliation. According to Lucian, Dionysus punished the shepherds by taking the form of a maiden, thus "maddening with sexual desire." When the maiden suddenly disappeared, the shepherds' erections remained until an oracle told them that they must placate the gods by dedicating clay models of genitals. This dedication thus became a custom of the festival.

However, Haloa was still a festival to Demeter, and the name of the festival itself points to the harvest activity of threshing. The threshing floor therefore still served as the center of harvest celebration and activity. Eustathius states that "there is celebrated, according to Pausanias, a feast of Demeter and Dionysus called the Haloa" and explains that, during this festival, first-fruits were carried from Athens to Eleusis in honor of the deities, sporting events were held upon the threshing floors, and at the feast there was a procession of Poseidon (worshipped here as Phytalmios, god of plants). Although a large part of Haloa was for women, the general procession and sporting events were open to all citizens.

The feast, or banquet, consisted of "gentle" or civilized foods—cereals, fish, possibly fowl, and "cakes shaped like the symbols of sex," but nothing of flesh. Other forbidden Eleusinian foods included pomegranate, which was considered dead-man's food and inappropriate for a feast honouring Demeter, as it was the fruit that drew her Persephone back into the shades of Hades. The Archons in Eleusis would prepare the tables for the women, and then wait outside to show visiting foreigners that civilized foods originated in Eleusis and were dispersed to the rest of mankind from Eleusis.

=== Women's activity ===
Ritualistically, Haloa was similar to Thesmophoria, another festival in honour of Demeter, in the significance of women's participation. Both festivals involved "lusty words" and activities, an abundance of sexual symbols, and the consumption of much wine and pornographic confectionery. The women celebrated alone so that "they might have perfect freedom of speech" and some sources state that "the sacred symbols of both sexes were handled, the priestesses secretly whispered into the ears of the women present words that might not be uttered aloud, and the women themselves uttered all manner of... unseemly quips and jests." 123

Demosthenes highlights the role of the priestess, pointing out that she, rather than the Hierophant (chief priest at the Eleusinian Mysteries), presented the fruit offerings and conducted the initiation ceremonies under the presidency of women. He also emphasizes that it was unlawful to offer any blood sacrifice, using as example the story of a Hierophant who was cursed because he offered "in the court of Eleusis burnt sacrifice of an animal victim."

== Further resources ==
Evy Johanne Håland has a presentation of the festival and analysis in her two-volume work on Greek Festivals, Modern and Ancient: A Comparison of Female and Male Values, Newcastle upon Tyne: Cambridge Scholars Publishing, 2017 (http://www.cambridgescholars.com/search?Q=h%C3%A5land&As=true&As=false&Mid=0&Sid=true&Sid=false%5B%5D), esp. Ch. 5-7.

See also Håland, Evy Johanne. "The Ritual Year Of Athena: The Agricultural Cycle Of The Olive, Girls' Rites Of Passage, And Official Ideology." Journal of Religious History 36.2 (2012): p256-284.

Lowe, NJ. "Thesmophoria and haloa: myth, physics and mysteries." The Sacred and the Feminine in Ancient Greece. 1 January 1998. P120-149.

Dillon, Matthew. Girls and Women in Classical Greek Religion. Routledge, 2003.
