= Chrysanthis =

Greek mythological figure

In Greek mythology, Chrysanthis (Ancient Greek: Χρυσανθίς) was a female figure associated with the goddess Demeter.

== Mythology ==
According to an Argive legend recorded by Pausanias, Chrysanthis informed Demeter of the abduction of Persephone by Hades when Demeter was visiting Pelasgus in Argos. Thus, in the Argive account Chrysanthis substitutes for Hecate and Helios of the Homeric hymn to Demeter.

A relief uncovered near Lerna portrays an altar, to the left of which stands Demeter, to the right stand Chrysanthis, her husband Mysius, and two maidens presumed to be their daughters. Mysius is otherwise known as a native of Argos who offered hospitality to Demeter and dedicated a sanctuary to her, from which circumstance the goddess received the surname Mysia. The family may be seen as a parallel to Celeus, Metaneira, and their daughters.
