= Mysius =

In Greek mythology, Mysius (Ancient Greek: Μύσιος) was a figure meant to provide an etiology for Mysia as a surname of Demeter. He was said to have received Demeter hospitably in his home in Argos as she was searching for Persephone, and to have founded a sanctuary of Demeter Mysia, known as "Mysaeum", located at the distance of about sixty stadia from Pellene; another temple of Demeter Mysia was reportedly situated on the road from Mycenae to Argos.

Mysius is portrayed on a relief uncovered in Lerna alongside Demeter and Chrysanthis: the latter was presumably seen as his daughter or wife.
