= Aegila =

Coordinates: 36°33′33″N 22°27′58″E

Aegila or Aigila (Ancient Greek: τὰ Αἴγιλα or Αἴγιλα) was a town of ancient Laconia with a temple of Demeter.

It site is tentatively located at Kionia Kournou.
