= Amphictyonis =

Epithet of Demeter at Thermopylae

Amphictyonis /ˌæmfɪkˈtaɪənɪs/ (Ancient Greek: Ἀμφικτυονίς, romanized: Amphiktuonís) in Greek mythology is a local form of Demeter. She was worshiped under this name at Anthela, because it was a meeting place for the amphictyons of Thermopylae, who offered sacrifices to her at the start of every meeting.

The general council of the Amphictyonians was where major Greek nations met after the battle of Salamis around 480 BC. It was here that the Lacedaemonians argued that those cities which were not in the league, nor had fought against the Persians, should be excluded from the league. Themistocles of Athens disagreed, for the reason that it would be intolerable if most of Greece should be excluded, and the general council should come to be ruled by two or three great cities.
