= Phytalus =

King of Attica who gave Demeter hospitality

In Greek mythology, Phytalus (Ancient Greek: Φύταλος, Phútalos) was a hero and king of Attica who gave Demeter hospitality when she was searching for her daughter, Persephone. Demeter thanked Phytalus for his kindness by giving him a fig-tree. He was revered in Eleusis. His tomb was shown in the deme Lakidai near Cephisus.

Members of the clan Phytalidae, who claimed descent from Phytalus, were said to have cleansed Theseus of the murders he had committed on his way from Troezen to Athens and to have later been put in charge of the hero cult of Theseus in reward for their hospitality.
