= Thalysia =

Ancient Greek festival

Thalysia (Ancient Greek: Θαλύσια) was an ancient Greek festival celebrated in honour of Dionysus and Demeter or of Demeter alone. It was held in autumn, after the harvest, to thank the gods for the benefits they had conferred upon men.
