= Demeter =

Greek goddess of the harvest, grains, and agriculture

- Goddess of the harvest, agriculture, fertility, and sacred law
- Member of the twelve Olympians
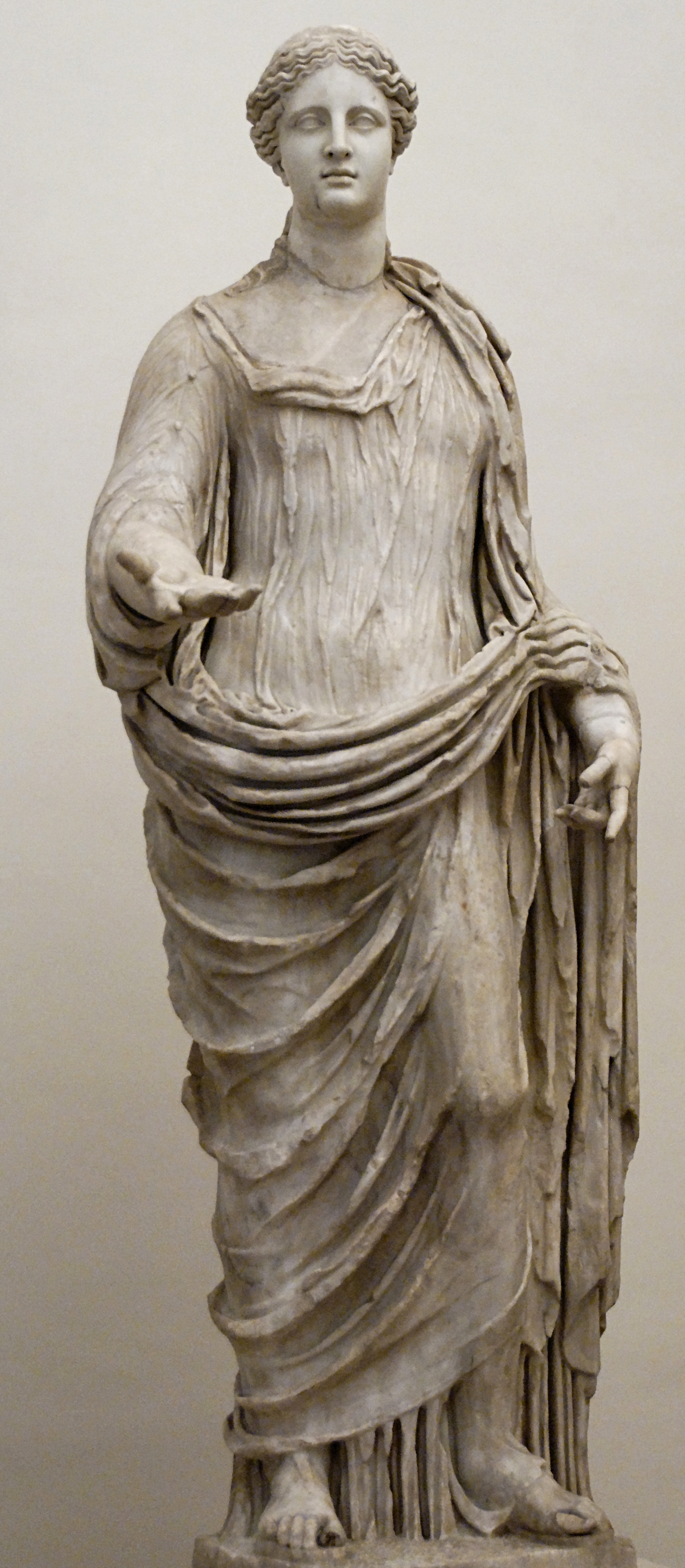
- Ancient marble statue of Demeter with right hand extended. The head is a modern restoration. (National Roman Museum)
- Abode: Mount Olympus
- Animals: Pig, serpent, gecko, turtledove, crane, scops owl
- Symbol: Cornucopia, wheat, torch, poppy, bread
- Festivals: Thesmophoria, Eleusinian Mysteries, Lithobolia

Genealogy
- Parents: Cronus and Rhea
- Siblings: Hestia, Hera, Hades, Poseidon, Zeus
- Children: Persephone, Despoina, Eubuleus, Arion, Plutus, Philomelus, Iacchus, Hecate (Orphic)

Equivalents
- Roman: Ceres
- Egyptian: Isis

In ancient Greek religion and mythology, Demeter (/dɪˈmiːtər/; Attic: Δημήτηρ Dēmḗtēr [dɛːmɛ́ːtɛːr]; Doric: Δαμάτηρ Dāmā́tēr) is the Olympian goddess of the harvest and agriculture, presiding over crops, grains, food, and the fertility of the earth. Although Demeter is mostly known as a grain goddess, she also appeared as a goddess of health, birth, and marriage, and had connections to the underworld. She is also called Deo (Δηώ Dēṓ).

In Greek tradition, Demeter is the second child of the Titans Rhea and Cronus, and sister to Hestia, Hera, Hades, Poseidon, and Zeus. Like her other siblings except Zeus, she was swallowed by her father as an infant and rescued by Zeus. Through Zeus, she became the mother of Persephone, a fertility goddess and resurrection deity. One of the most notable Homeric Hymns, the Homeric Hymn to Demeter, tells the story of Persephone's abduction by Hades and Demeter's search for her. When Hades, the King of the Underworld, wished to make Persephone his wife, he abducted her from a field while she was picking flowers, with Zeus's leave. Demeter searched everywhere to find her missing daughter to no avail until she was informed that Hades had taken her to the Underworld. In response, Demeter neglected her duties as goddess of agriculture, plunging the earth into a deadly famine where nothing would grow, causing mortals to die. Zeus ordered Hades to return Persephone to her mother to avert the disaster. However, because Persephone had eaten food from the Underworld, she could not stay with Demeter forever, but had to divide the year between her mother and her husband, explaining the seasonal cycle as Demeter refusing to let plants grow while Persephone is gone.

Her cult titles include Sito (Σιτώ), "she of the Grain", as the giver of food or grain, and Thesmophoros (θεσμός, thesmos: divine order, unwritten law; φόρος, phoros: bringer, bearer), "giver of customs" or "legislator", in association with the secret female-only festival called the Thesmophoria. Though Demeter is often described simply as the goddess of the harvest, she presided also over the sacred law and the cycle of life and death. She and Persephone were the central figures of the Eleusinian Mysteries, which promised the initiated a happy afterlife. This religious tradition was based on ancient agrarian cults of agricultural communities and predated the Olympian pantheon, probably having its roots in the Mycenaean period c. 1400–1200 BC.

Demeter was often considered to be the same figure as the Anatolian goddess Cybele, and she was identified with the Roman goddess Ceres.

== Etymology ==
Demeter may appear in Linear A as da-ma-te on three documents (AR Zf 1 and 2, and KY Za 2), all three dedicated to religious situations and all three bearing just the name (i-da-ma-te on AR Zf 1 and 2). It is unlikely that Demeter appears as da-ma-te in a Linear B (Mycenean Greek) inscription (PY En 609); the word 𐀅𐀔𐀳, da-ma-te, probably refers to "households". On the other hand, 𐀯𐀵𐀡𐀴𐀛𐀊, si-to-po-ti-ni-ja, "Potnia of the Grain", is regarded as referring to her Bronze Age predecessor or to one of her epithets.

Demeter's character as mother-goddess is identified in the second element of her name meter (μήτηρ) derived from Proto-Indo-European (PIE) *méh₂tēr (mother). In antiquity, different explanations were already proffered for the first element of her name. It is possible that Da (Δᾶ), a word which corresponds to Gē (Γῆ) in Attic, is the Doric form of De (Δῆ), "earth", the old name of the chthonic earth-goddess, and that Demeter is "Mother-Earth". Liddell & Scott find this "improbable" and Beekes writes, "there is no indication that [da] means 'earth'", although it has also been assumed in the name of Poseidon found in the Linear B inscription E-ne-si-da-o-ne, "earth-shaker". John Chadwick also argues that the dā element in the name of Demeter is not so simply equated with "earth".

M. L. West has proposed that the word Demeter, initially Damater, could be a borrowing from an Illyrian deity attested in the Messapic goddess Damatura, with a form dā- ("earth", from PIE *dʰǵʰ(e)m-) attached to -matura ("mother"), akin to the Illyrian god Dei-paturos (dei-, "sky", attached to -paturos, "father"). The Lesbian form Dō- may simply reflect a different colloquial pronunciation of the non-Greek name.

Another theory suggests that the element De- might be connected with Deo, an epithet of Demeter and it could derive from the Cretan word dea (δηά), Ionic zeia (ζειά)—variously identified with emmer, spelt, rye, or other grains by modern scholars—so that she is the mother and the giver of food generally. This view is shared by British scholar Jane Ellen Harrison, who suggests that Démeter's name means Grain-Mother, instead of Earth-Mother.

An alternative Proto-Indo-European etymology comes through Potnia and Despoina, where Des- represents a derivative of PIE *dem (house, dome), and Demeter is "mother of the house" (from PIE *dems-méh₂tēr). R. S. P. Beekes rejects a Greek interpretation, but not necessarily an Indo-European one.

== Iconography ==
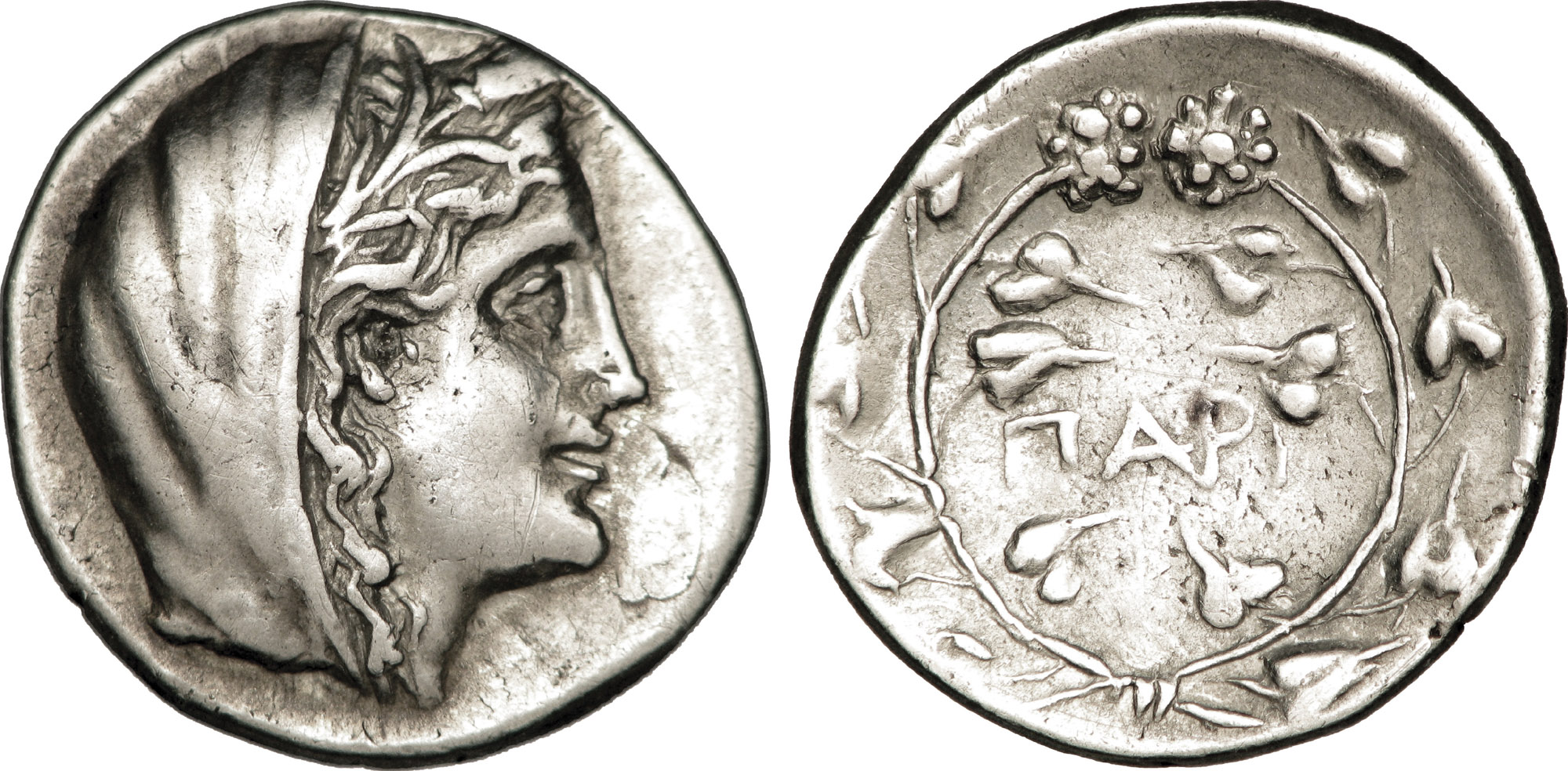
Demeter on a Didrachme from Paros island, struck at the Cyclades.

Demeter was frequently associated with images of the harvest, including flowers, fruit, and grain. She was also sometimes pictured with her daughter Persephone. However, Demeter is not generally portrayed with any of her consorts; the exception is Iasion, the youth of Crete who lay with her in a thrice-ploughed field and was killed afterward by a jealous Zeus with a thunderbolt.

Demeter is assigned the zodiac constellation Virgo, the Virgin, by Marcus Manilius in his 1st-century Roman work Astronomicon. In art, the constellation Virgo holds Spica, a sheaf of wheat in her hand and sits beside constellation Leo the Lion.

In Arcadia, she was known as "Black Demeter". She was said to have taken the form of a mare to escape the pursuit of her younger brother, Poseidon, and having been raped by him despite her disguise, she dressed all in black and retreated into a cave to mourn and to purify herself. She was consequently depicted with the head of a horse in this region.

A sculpture of the Black Demeter was made by Onatas.

== Description ==
In the earliest conceptions of Demeter she is the goddess of grain and threshing, however her functions were extended beyond the fields and she was often identified with the earth goddess (Gaia). Some of the epithets of Gaia and Demeter are similar showing the identity of their nature. In most of her myths and cults, Demeter is the "Grain-Mother" or the "Earth-Mother". In the older chthonic cults the earth goddess was related to the Underworld and in the secret rites (mysteries) Demeter and Persephone share the double function of death and fertility. Demeter is the giver of the secret rites and the giver of the laws of cereal agriculture. She was occasionally identified with the Great Mother Rhea-Cybele who was worshipped in Crete and Asia Minor with the music of cymbals and violent rites. It seems that poppies were connected with the cult of the Great Mother.

=== As an agricultural goddess ===
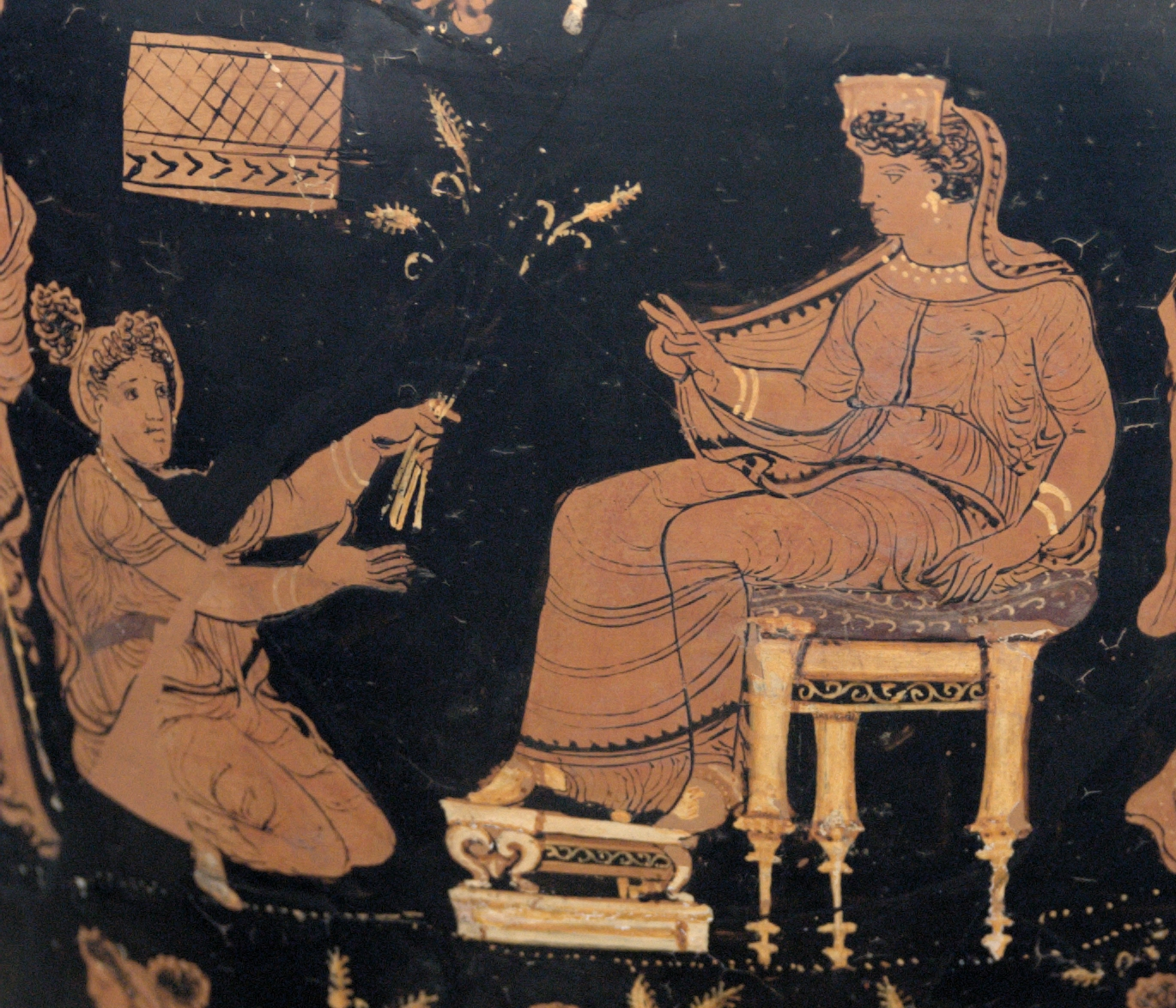
Demeter, enthroned and extending her hand in a benediction toward the kneeling Metaneira, who offers the triune wheat (c. 340 BC)

In epic poetry and Hesiod's Theogony, Demeter is the Grain-Mother, the goddess of cereals who provides grain for bread and blesses its harvesters. In Homer's Iliad, the light-haired Demeter with the help of the wind separates the grain from the chaff. Homer mentions the Thalysia a Greek harvest-festival of first fruits in honour of Demeter . In Hesiod, prayers to Zeus-Chthonios (chthonic Zeus) and Demeter help the crops grow full and strong. This was her main function at Eleusis, and she became panhellenic. In Cyprus, "grain-harvesting" was damatrizein. Demeter was the zeidoros arοura, the Homeric "Mother Earth arοura" who gave the gift of cereals (zeai or deai).

Most of the epithets of Demeter describe her as a goddess of grain. Her name Deo in literature probably relates her with deai a Cretan word for cereals. In Attica she was called Haloas (of the threshing floor) according to the earliest conception of Demeter as the Corn-Mother. She was sometimes called Chloe (ripe-grain or fresh-green) and sometimes Ioulo (ioulos : grain sheaf). Chloe was the goddess of young corn and young vegetation and "Iouloi" were harvest songs in honour of the goddess. The reapers called Demeter Amallophoros (bringer of sheaves) and Amaia (reaper). The goddess was the giver of abundance of food and she was known as Sito (of the grain) and Himalis (of abundance ). The bread from the first harvest-fruits was called thalysian bread (Thalysia) in honour of Demeter. The sacrificial cakes burned on the altar were called "ompniai" and in Attica the goddess was known as Ompnia (related to corns). These cakes were offered to all gods.

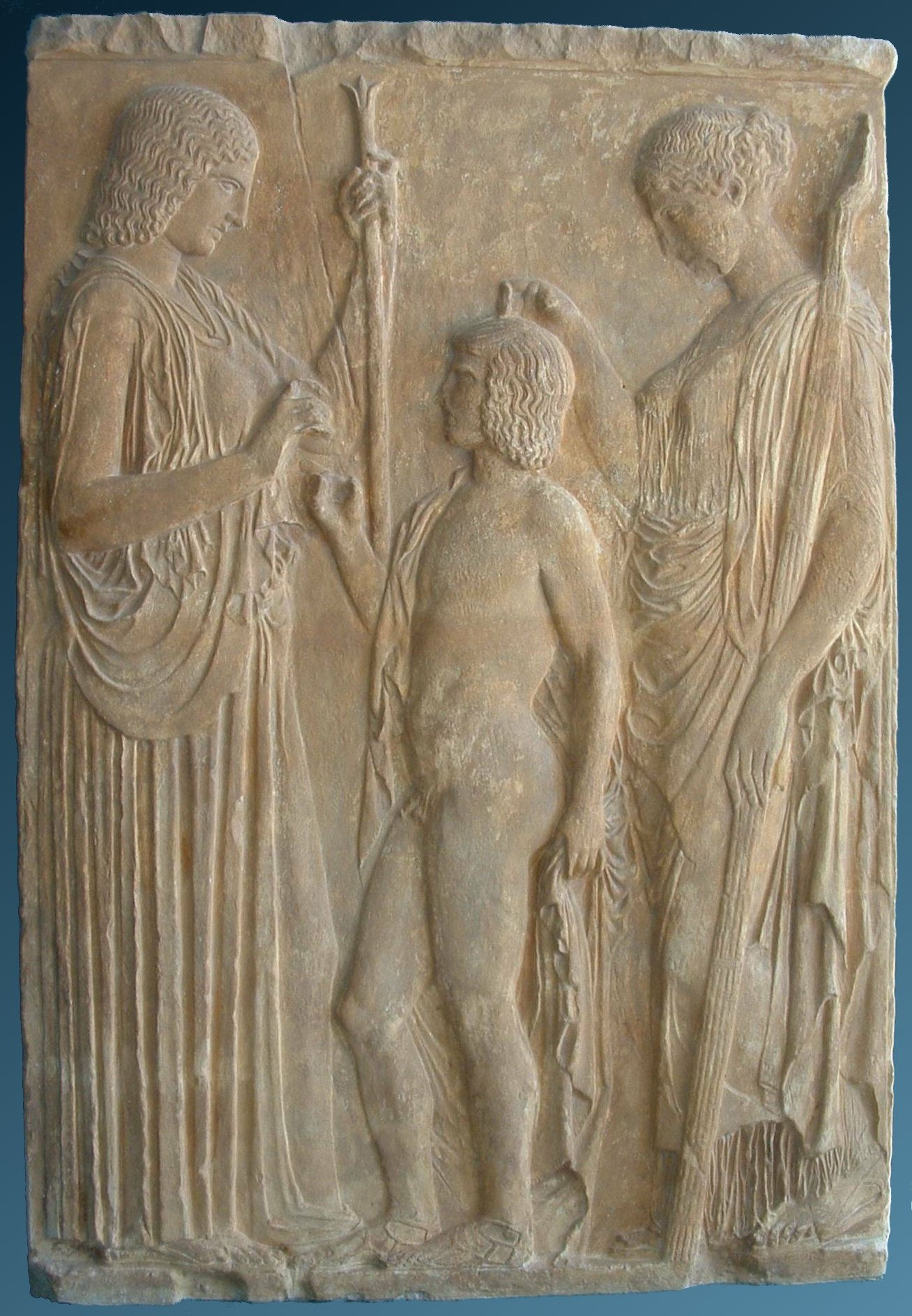
The Eleusinian trio: Persephone, Triptolemus and Demeter (Roman copy dating to the Early Imperial period and hosted by the Metropolitan Museum of Art, of the Great Eleusinian Relief in the National Archaeological Museum, Athens, marble bas-relief from Eleusis, 440–430 BC.)

In some feasts big loaves (artoi) were offered to the goddess and in Boeotia she was known as Megalartos (of the big loaf) and Megalomazos (of the big mass, or big porridge). Her function was extended to vegetation generally and to all fruits and she had the epithets eukarpos (of good crop), karpophoros (bringer of fruits), malophoros (apple bearer) and sometimes Oria (all the fruits of the season). These epithets show an identity in nature with the earth goddess.

The central theme in the Eleusinian Mysteries was the reunion of Persephone with her mother, Demeter when new crops were reunited with the old seed, a form of eternity.

According to the Athenian rhetorician Isocrates, Demeter's greatest gifts to humankind were agriculture which gave to men a civilized way of life, and the Mysteries which give the initiate higher hopes in this life and the afterlife.

These two gifts were intimately connected in Demeter's myths and mystery cults. Demeter is the giver of mystic rites and the giver of the civilized way of life (teaching the laws of agriculture). Her epithet Eleusinia relates her with the Eleusinian mysteries, however at Sparta Eleusinia had an early use, and it was probably a name rather than an epithet. Demeter Thesmophoros (law-giving) is closely associated to the laws of cereal agriculture. The festival Thesmophoria was celebrated throughout Greece and was connected to a form of agrarian magic. Her epithet Damia (as paired with Auxesia for Persephone) was the center of the festival called the Lithobolia. Near Pheneus in Arcadia she was known as Demeter-Thesmia (lawfull), and she received rites according to the local version.

Demeter's emblem is the poppy, a bright red flower that grows among the barley. In one of his Idylls, Theocritus describes a statue of Demeter as holding sheaves and poppies in its arms.

Karl Kerényi asserted that poppies were connected with a Cretan cult which was eventually carried to the Eleusinian Mysteries in Classical Greece. In a clay statuette from Gazi, the Minoan poppy goddess wears the seed capsules, sources of nourishment and narcosis, in her diadem. According to Kerényi, "It seems probable that the Great Mother Goddess who bore the names Rhea and Demeter, brought the poppy with her from her Cretan cult to Eleusis and it is almost certain that in the Cretan cult sphere opium was prepared from poppies."

=== As an earth and underworld goddess ===
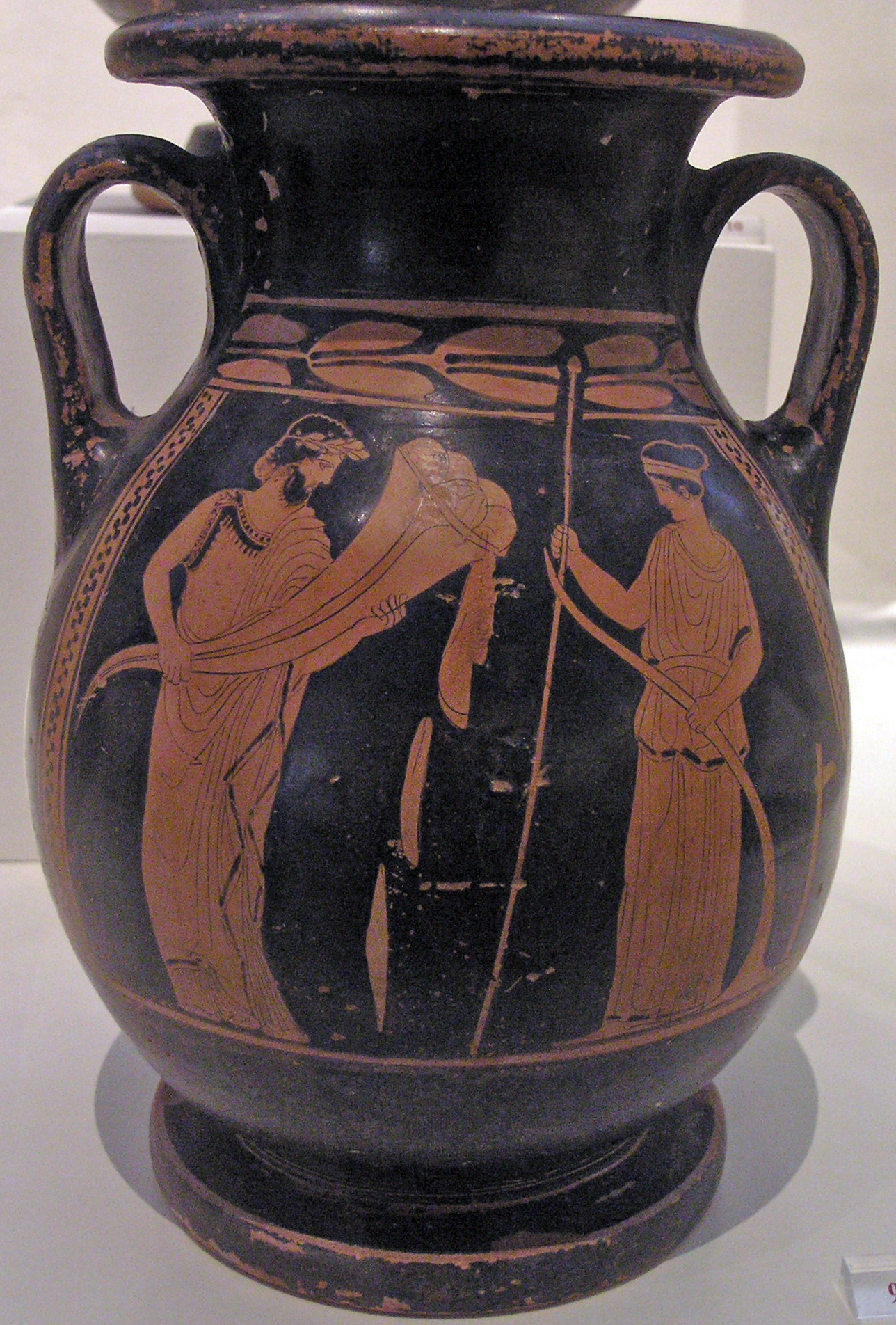
Pelike. Plouton with a cornucopia and Demeter with a sceptre and plough. By the Orestes Painter. 440-430 BC.National Archaeological Museum, Athens

In addition to her role as an agricultural goddess, Demeter was often worshipped more generally as a goddess of the earth, from which crops spring up. Her individuality was rooted to the less developed personality of Gaia (earth). In Arcadia Demeter Melaina (the black Demeter) was represented as snake-haired with a horse's head holding a dove and dolphin, perhaps to symbolize her power over the Underworld, the air, and the water. The cult of Demeter in the region was related to Despoina, a very old chthonic divinity. Demeter shares the double function of death and fertility with her daughter Persephone. Demeter and Persephone were called Despoinai (the mistresses) and Demeters. This duality was also used in the classical period (Thesmophoroi, Double named goddesses) and particularly in an oath: "By the two goddesses".

In the cult of Phlya she was worshipped as Anesidora who sends up gifts from the Underworld.

In Sparta, she was known as Demeter-Chthonia (chthonic Demeter). After each death the mourning should end with a sacrifice to the goddess. Pausanias believes that her cult was introduced from Hermione, where Demeter was associated with Hades. In a local legend a hollow in the earth was the entrance to the underworld, by which the souls could pass easily. In Elis she was called Demeter-Chamyne (goddess of the ground), in an old chthonic cult associated with the descent to Hades. At Levadia the goddess was known as Demeter-Europa and she was associated with Trophonius, an old divinity of the underworld. The oracle of Trophonius was famous in the antiquity.

Pindar uses the rare epithet Chalkokrotos (bronze sounding). Brazen musical instruments were used in the mysteries of Demeter and the Great-Mother Rhea-Cybele was also worshipped with the music of cymbals.

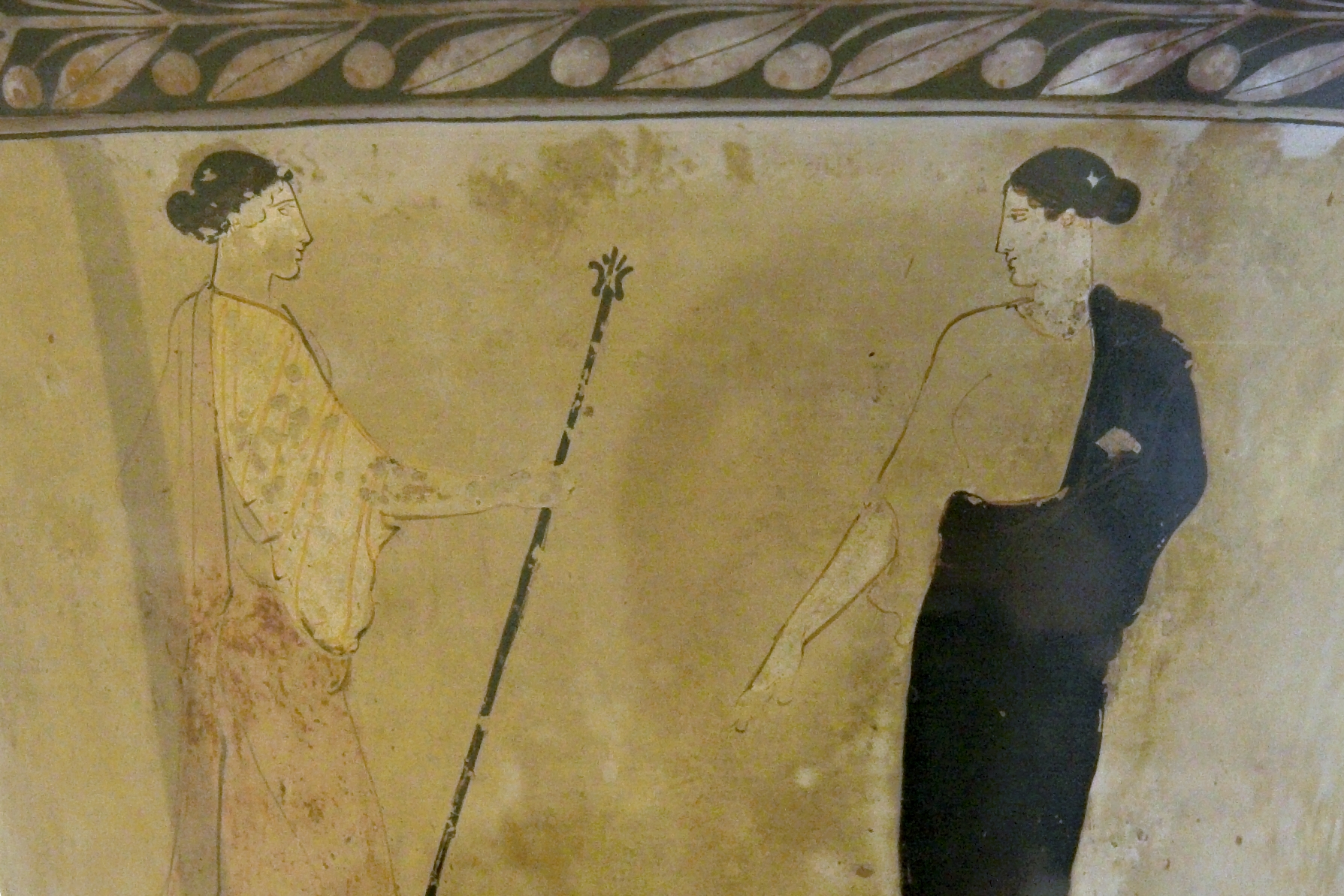
Attic white calyx crater 440-430 BC. Two female figures, probably Demeter and Persephone. Archaeological Museum of Agrigento.

In central Greece Demeter was known as Amphictyonis (of the dwellers-round), in a cult of the goddess at Anthele near Thermopylae (hot gates). She was the patron goddess of an ancient Amphictyony. Thermopylae is the place of hot springs considered to be entrances to Hades, since Demeter was a chthonic goddess in the older local cults.

The Athenians called the dead "Demetrioi", and this may reflect a link between Demeter and the ancient cult of the dead, linked to the agrarian belief that a new life would sprout from the dead body, as a new plant arises from buried seed. This was most likely a belief shared by initiates in Demeter's mysteries, as interpreted by Pindar: "Blessed is he who has seen before he goes under the earth; for he knows the end of life and knows also its divine beginning."

In Arcadia Demeter had the epithets Erinys (fury) and Melaina (black) which are associated with the myth of Demeter's rape by Poseidon. The epithets stress the darker side of her character and her relation to the dark underworld, in an old chthonic cult associated with wooden structures (xoana). Erinys had a similar function with the avenging Dike (Justice). In the mysteries of Pheneus the goddess was known as Cidaria. Her priest would put on the mask of Demeter, which was kept secret. The cult may have been connected with both the Underworld and a form of agrarian magic.

== Epithets ==
See Category:Epithets of Demeter

- Antaea (Ancient Greek: Ἀνταία): 'A goddess whom man may approach in prayers'. The epithet belongs not only to Demeter but also to Rhea and Cybele.
- Amphictyonis (Ancient Greek: Ἀμφικτυονίς): A form of Demeter worshiped at (presumably) Anthela because it was a meeting place for the amphictyons of Thermopylae, where sacrifices were offered to her at the start of every meeting.
- Amaia (Ancient Greek: Ἀμαία): This epithet was the subject of several ancient Greek proverbs. One was "Amaia looked for Azesia", with "Amaia" being an epithet for Demeter, and Azesia in this instance indicating Persephone, and referring to Demeter's long search for her daughter after she had been kidnapped by Hades. It was used to describe those who spend a long time searching. Similarly, "Amaia has found Azesia" was an expression used to indicate that something greatly missed and sought after has been found.
- Chloe (Greek: Χλόη): "Blooming", "fertility", "young, green foliage" or "shoots of plants in spring". The festival Chloeia (Χλόεια) or Chloia (Χλοιά), was held in Athens in honor of her and she had a sanctuary near the Acropolis. It was celebrated in the spring, on the sixth day of Thargelion, and marked the beginning of the blooming season. The celebration included the sacrifice of a goat and was characterized by joyful festivities and merrymaking.
- Chrysaoros (Greek: Χρυσαόρος): Demeter's epithet as "Lady of the Golden Blade", a reference to golden blades of wheat.
- Chthonia (Ancient Greek: Χθονία). 'Of the earth'. It was an epithet of Demeter and several other chthonic goddess, such as Hecate and Nyx.
- Daduchos (Ancient Greek): δᾳδοῦχος "torch-bearer", from δᾶις+ἔχω): An epithet of Demeter seeking her lost daughter Persephone with a torch. It was also an epithet of Hecate and Artemis, two goddesses associated with torches. It was also the title of the second priest (ranking after the Hierophant) at the Eleusinian Mysteries. This title was given in the Rhodes Island in Greece.
- Rharias or Rarias (Ῥαριάς), from the Rarian Field.

== Worship ==
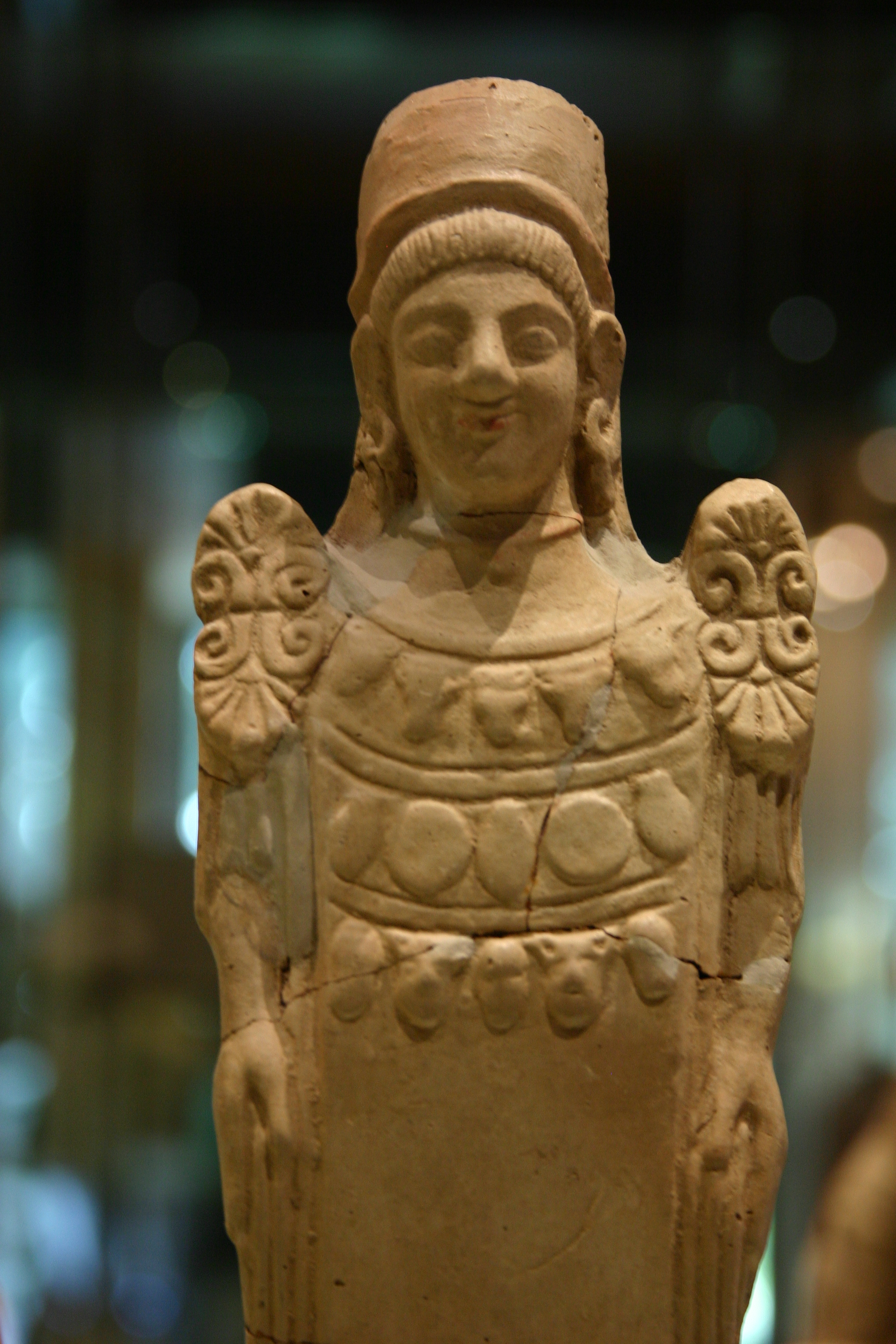
Terracotta Demeter figurine, Sanctuary of the Underworld Divinities, Akragas, 550–500 BC

=== In Crete ===
In an older tradition in Crete the vegetation cult was related with the deity of the cave. During the Bronze Age, a goddess of nature dominated both in Minoan and Mycenean cults. In the Linear B inscriptions po-ti-ni-ja (potnia) refers to the goddess of nature who was concerned with birth and vegetation and had certain chthonic aspects. Some scholars believe that she was the universal mother goddess. A Linear B inscription at Knossos mentions the potnia of the labyrinth da-pu-ri-to-jo po-ti-ni-ja. Poseidon was often given the title wa-na-ka (wanax) in Linear B inscriptions in his role as King of the Underworld, and his title E-ne-si-da-o-ne indicates his chthonic nature. He was the male companion (paredros) of the goddess in the Minoan and probably Mycenean cult. In the cave of Amnisos, Enesidaon is associated with the cult of Eileithyia, the goddess of childbirth, who was involved with the annual birth of the divine child. Elements of this early form of worship survived in the Eleusinian cult, where the following words were uttered: "the mighty Potnia had born a strong son."

=== On the Greek mainland ===
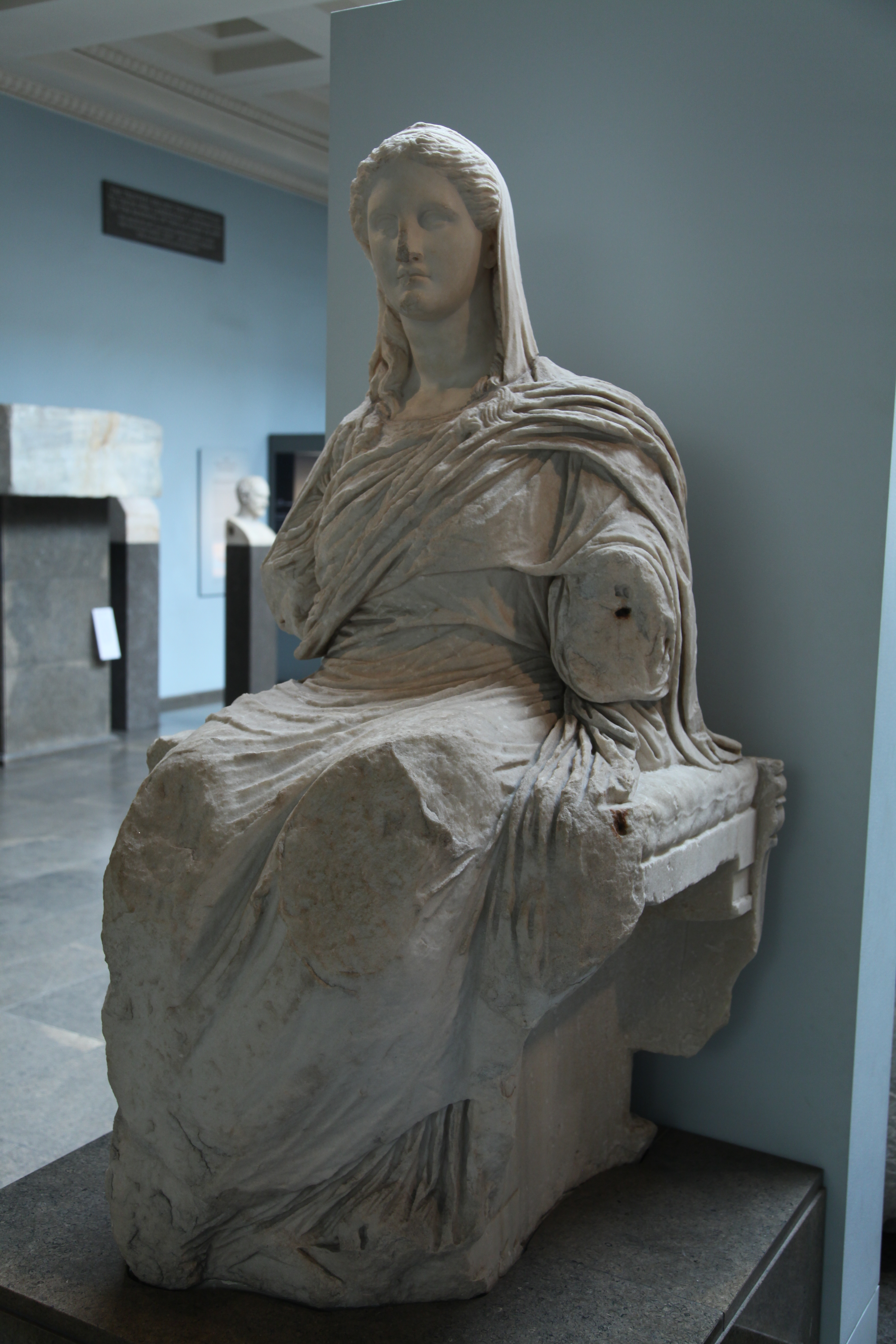
Demeter of Knidos, Hellenistic marble sculpture, around 350 BC

Tablets from Pylos of c. 1400 – c. 1200 BC record sacrificial goods destined for "the Two Queens and Poseidon" ("to the Two Queens and the King":wa-na-ssoi, wa-na-ka-te). The "Two Queens" may be related to Demeter and Persephone or their precursors, goddesses who were no longer associated with Poseidon in later periods. In Pylos potnia (mistress) is the major goddess of the city and "wanax " in the tablets has a similar nature with her male consort in the Minoan cult. Potnia retained some chthonic cults, and in popular religion these were related to the goddess Demeter. In Greek religion potniai (mistresses) appear in plural (like the Erinyes) and are closely related to the Eleusinian Demeter.

Major cults to Demeter are known at Eleusis in Attica, Hermion (in Crete), Megara, Celeae, Lerna, Aegila, Munychia, Corinth, Delos, Priene, Akragas, Iasos, Pergamon, Selinus, Tegea, Thoricus, Dion (in Macedonia) Lykosoura, Mesembria, Enna, and Samothrace.

Probably the earliest Amphictyony centred on the cult of Demeter at Anthele (Ἀνθήλη), lay on the coast of Malis south of Thessaly, near Thermopylae.

Mysian Demeter had a seven-day festival at Pellené in Arcadia. The geographer Pausanias passed the shrine to Mysian Demeter on the road from Mycenae to Argos and reports that according to Argive tradition, the shrine was founded by an Argive named Mysius who venerated Demeter.

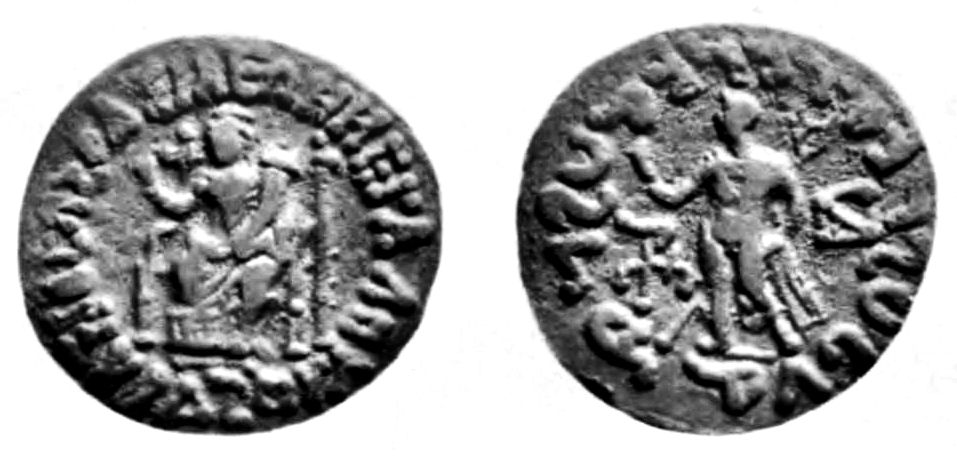
Azes coin in India, with Demeter and Hermes, 1st century BC

==== "Saint Demetra" ====
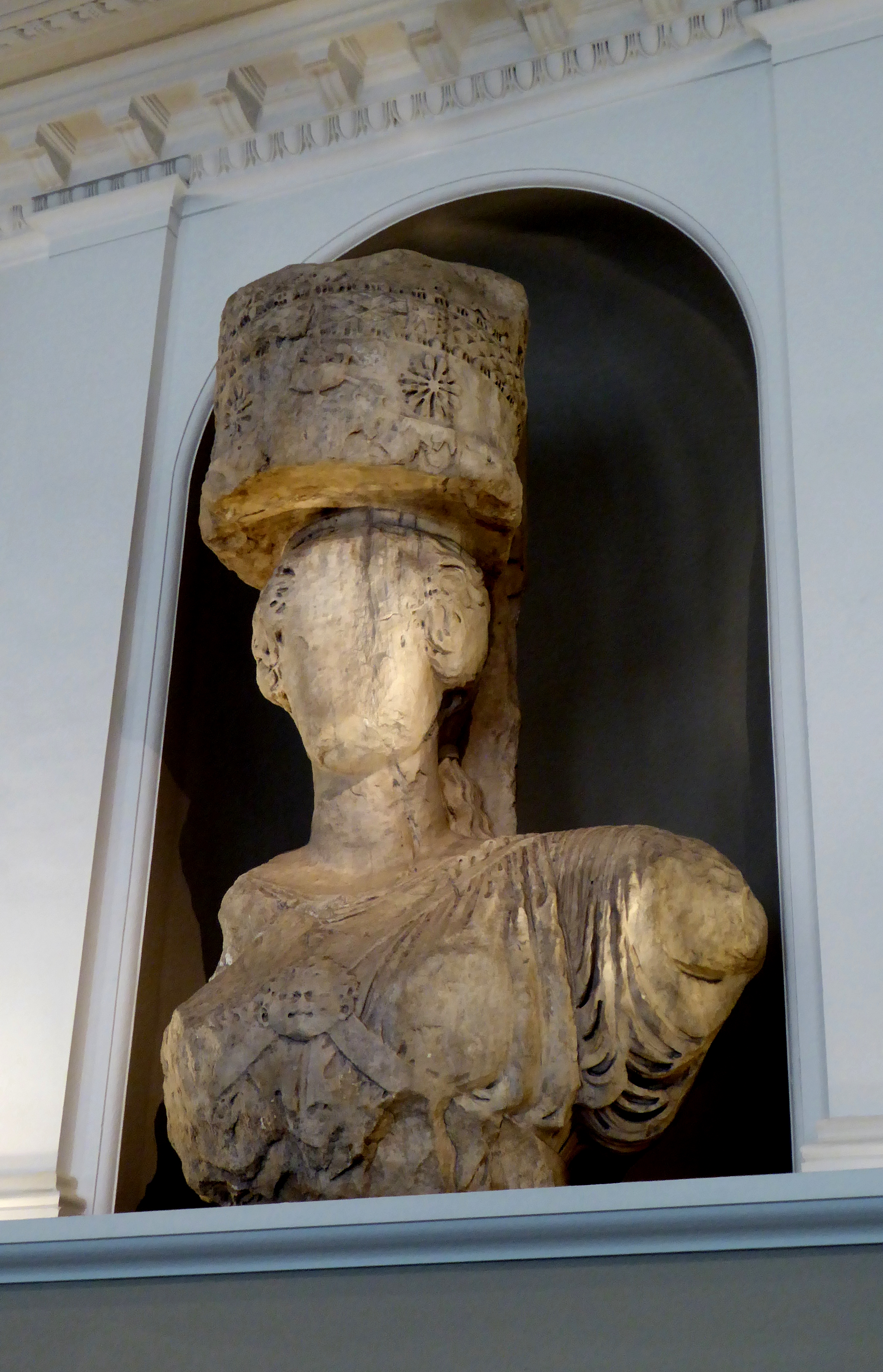
The statue of Saint Demetra, Fitzwilliam Museum

Even after Theodosius I issued the Edict of Thessalonica and banned paganism throughout the Roman Empire, people throughout Greece continued to pray to Demeter as "Saint Demetra", patron saint of agriculture. Around 1765–1766, the antiquary Richard Chandler, alongside the architect Nicholas Revett and the painter William Pars, visited Eleusis and mentioned a statue of a caryatid as well as the folklore that surrounded it, they stated that it was considered sacred by the locals because it protected their crops. They called the statue "Saint Demetra", a saint whose story had many similarities to the myth of Demeter and Persephone, except that her daughter had been abducted by the Turks and not by Hades. The locals covered the statue with flowers to ensure the fertility of their fields. This tradition continued until 1801, when the statue was removed by Edward Daniel Clarke, who later donated it to the University of Cambridge. The statue is now located in the Fitzwilliam Museum, the art and antiquities museum of the University of Cambridge.

=== Festivals ===
Demeter's two major festivals were sacred mysteries. Her Thesmophoria festival (11–13 October) was women-only. Her Eleusinian mysteries were open to initiates of any gender or social class. At the heart of both festivals were myths concerning Demeter as the mother and Persephone as her daughter.

=== Conflation with other goddesses ===
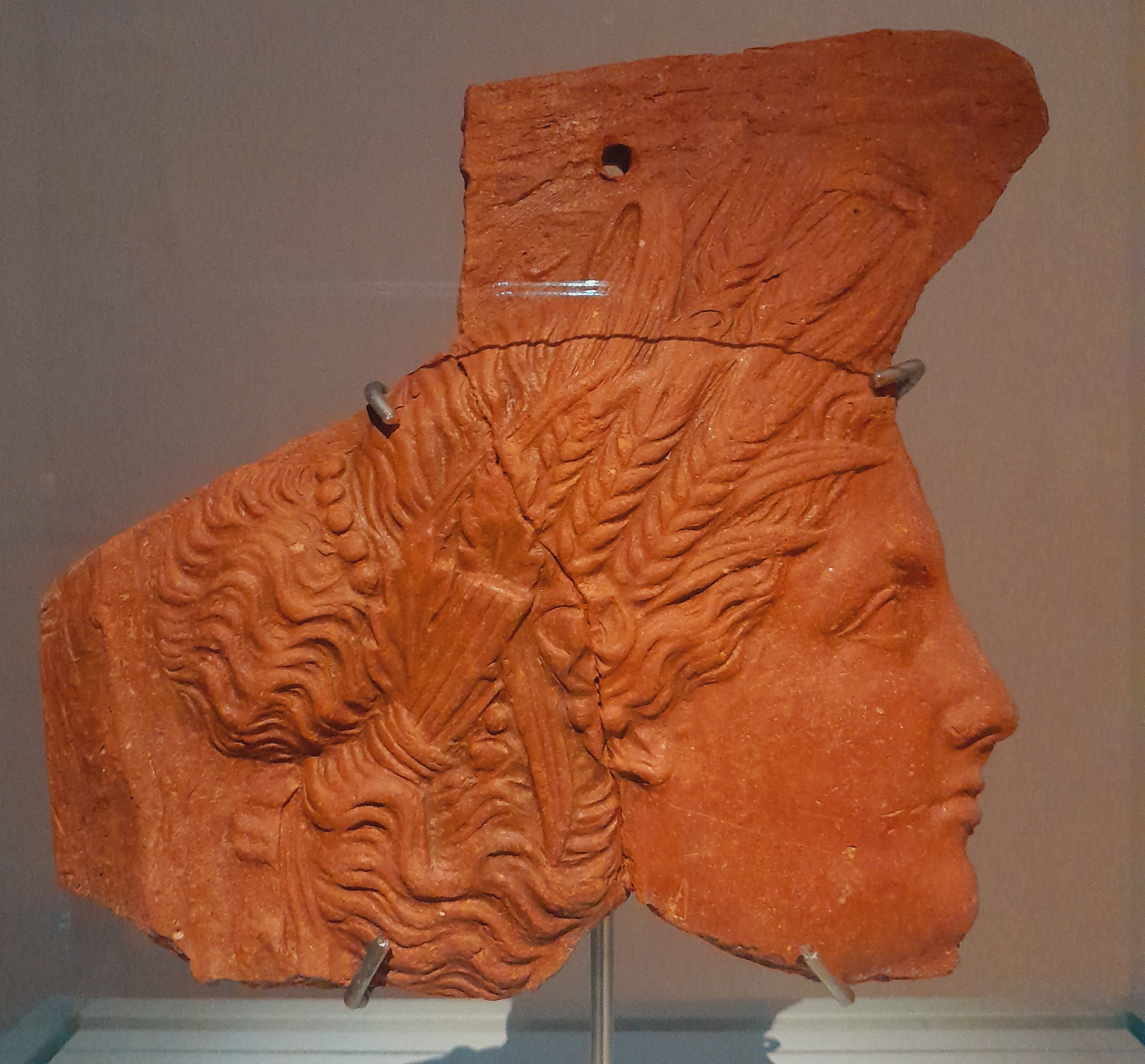
Terracotta plaque relief of Demeter in profile wearing ears of corn, 1st century BC–AD, Archaeological Museum of Amorgos, Greece.

In the Roman period, Demeter became conflated with the Roman agricultural goddess Ceres through interpretatio romana. The worship of Demeter has formally merged with that of Ceres around 205 BC, along with the ritus graecia cereris, a Greek-inspired form of cult, as part of Rome's general religious recruitment of deities as allies against Carthage, towards the end of the Second Punic War. The cult originated in southern Italy (part of Magna Graecia) and was probably based on the Thesmophoria, a mystery cult dedicated to Demeter and Persephone as "Mother and Maiden". It arrived along with its Greek priestesses, who were granted Roman citizenship so that they could pray to the gods "with a foreign and external knowledge, but with a domestic and civil intention". The new cult was installed in the already ancient Temple of Ceres, Liber and Libera, Rome's Aventine patrons of the plebs; from the end of the 3rd century BC, Demeter's temple at Enna, in Sicily, was acknowledged as Ceres's oldest, most authoritative cult centre, and Libera was recognized as Proserpina, Roman equivalent to Persephone.

Their joint cult recalls Demeter's search for Persephone after the latter's abduction into the Underworld by Hades. At the Aventine, the new cult took its place alongside the old. It did not refer to Liber, whose open and gender-mixed cult played a central role in plebeian culture as a patron and protector of plebeian rights, freedoms and values. The exclusively female initiates and priestesses of the new "greek style" mysteries of Ceres and Proserpina were expected to uphold Rome's traditional, patrician-dominated social hierarchy and traditional morality. Unmarried girls should emulate the chastity of Proserpina, the maiden; married women should seek to emulate Ceres, the devoted and fruitful mother. Their rites were intended to secure a good harvest and increase the fertility of those who partook in the mysteries.

Beginning in the 5th century BCE in Asia Minor, Demeter was also considered equivalent to the Phrygian goddess Cybele. Demeter's festival of Thesmophoria was popular throughout Asia Minor, and the myth of Persephone and Adonis in many ways mirrors the myth of Cybele and Attis.

Some late antique sources syncretized several "great goddess" figures into a single deity. For example, the Platonist philosopher Apuleius, writing in the late 2nd century, identified Ceres (Demeter) with Isis, having her declare:

I, mother of the universe, mistress of all the elements, first-born of the ages, highest of the gods, queen of the shades, first of those who dwell in heaven, representing in one shape all gods and goddesses. My will controls the shining heights of heaven, the health-giving sea winds, and the mournful silences of hell; the entire world worships my single godhead in a thousand shapes, with divers rites, and under many a different name. The Phrygians, first-born of mankind, call me the Pessinuntian Mother of the gods; ... the ancient Eleusinians Actaean Ceres; ... and the Egyptians who excel in ancient learning, honour me with the worship which is truly mine and call me by my true name: Queen Isis.

--Apuleius, translated by E. J. Kenny. The Golden Ass

== Mythology ==
=== Lineage, consorts, and offspring ===
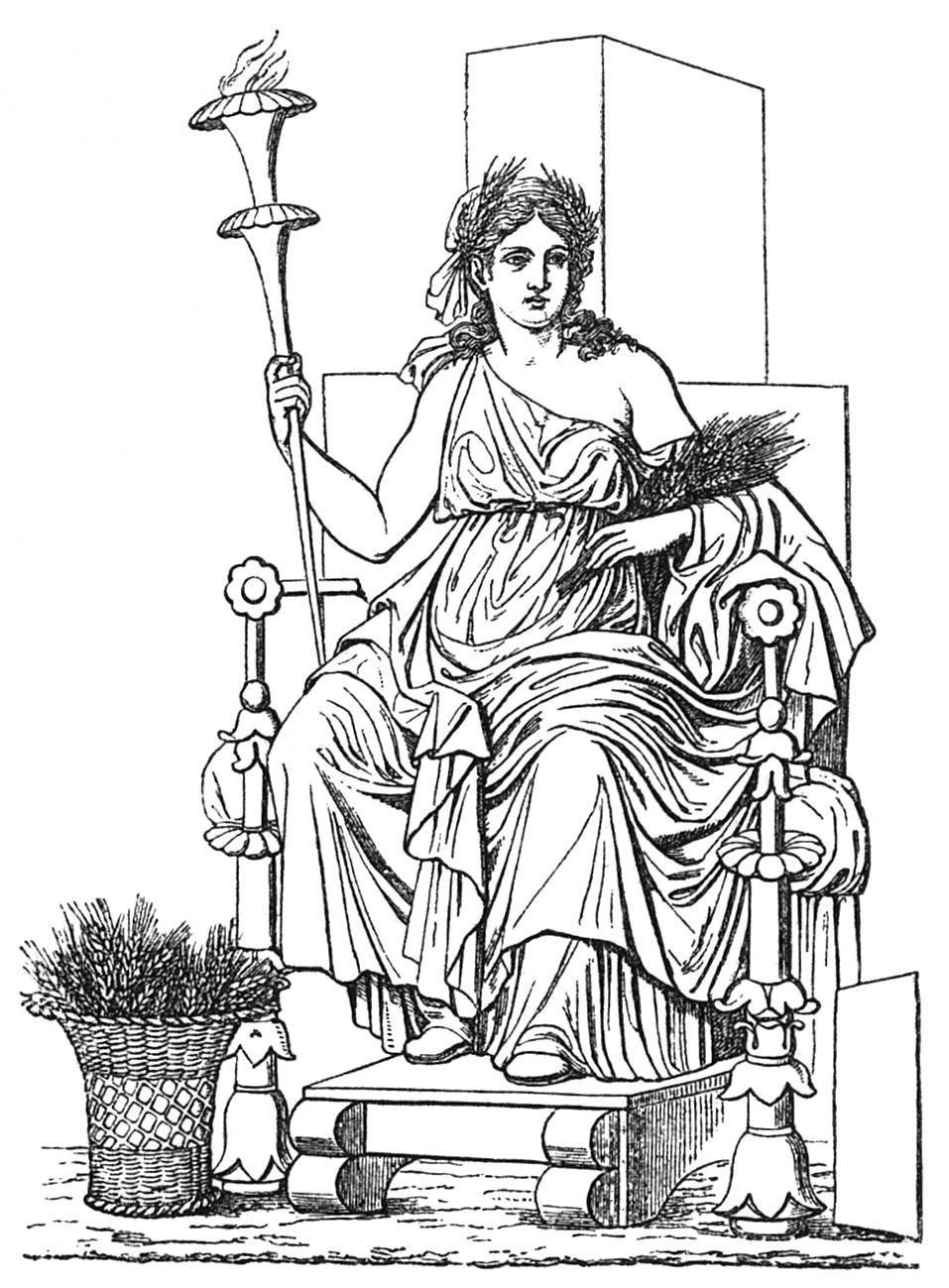
German illustration (ca. 1890) of a Pompeiian fresco of Demeter as a mother goddess and goddess of agriculture.

Hesiod's Theogony (c. 700 BC) describes Demeter as the second child of the Titans Cronus and Rhea, and the sister of Hestia, Hera, Hades, Poseidon, and Zeus. Alongside the rest of her sisters and brothers with the exception of her youngest brother Zeus, Demeter was swallowed as a newborn by her father due to his fear of being overthrown by one of his children; she was later freed when Zeus made Cronus disgorge all of his children by giving him an emetic. Zeus then led his siblings in a war against their father and the other Titans. Cronus was supplanted by this new generation of deities; and Demeter thus became one of the Olympian gods, the new rulers of the cosmos, alongside her brothers and sisters.

Demeter is notable as the mother of Persephone, described by both Hesiod and in the Homeric Hymn to Demeter as the result of a union with Zeus. An alternate recounting of the matter appears in a fragment of the lost Orphic theogony, which preserves part of a myth in which Zeus mates with his mother, Rhea, in the form of a snake, explaining the origin of the symbol on Hermes's staff. Their daughter is said to be Persephone, whom Zeus, in turn, mates with to conceive Dionysus. According to the Orphic fragments, "After becoming the mother of Zeus, she who was formerly Rhea became Demeter."

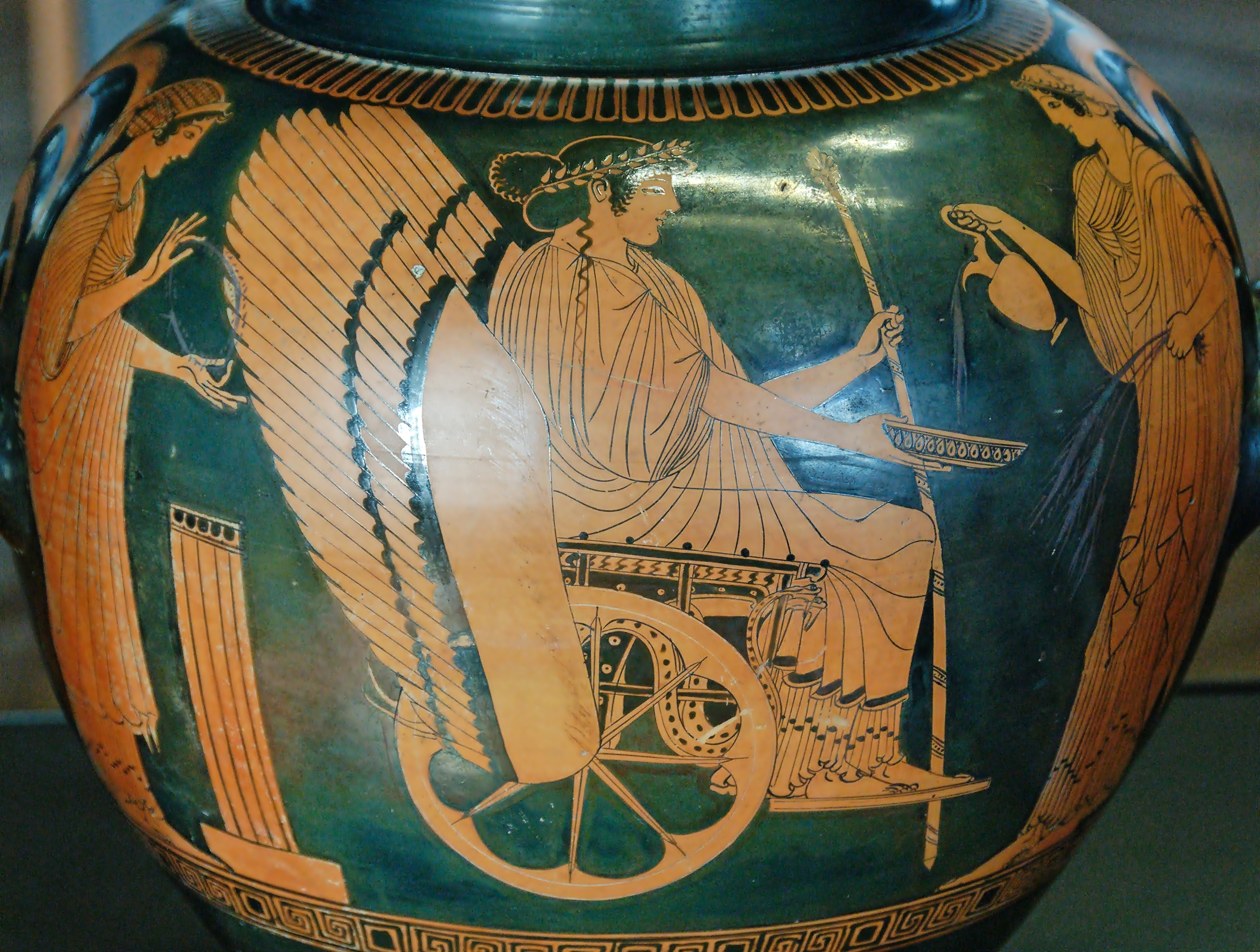
Triptolemus, Demeter and Persephone by the Triptolemos-painter, c. 470 BC, Louvre

There is some evidence that the figures of the Queen of the Underworld and the daughter of Demeter were initially considered separate goddesses. However, they must have become conflated by the time of Hesiod in the 7th century BC. Demeter and Persephone were often worshipped together and were often referred to by joint cultic titles. In their cult at Eleusis, they were referred to simply as "the goddesses", usually distinguished as "the older" and "the younger"; in Rhodes and Sparta, they were worshipped as "the Demeters"; in the Thesmophoria, they were known as "the thesmophoroi" ("the legislators"). In Arcadia they were known as "the Great Goddesses" and "the mistresses". In Mycenaean Pylos, Demeter and Persephone were probably called the "queens" (wa-na-ssoi).

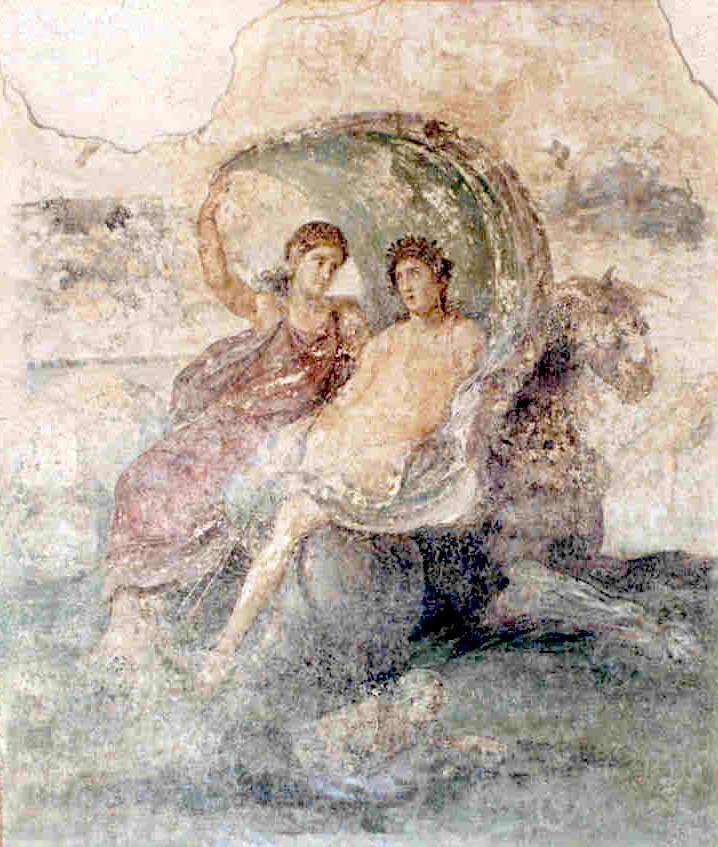
Dionysus (Bacchus) and Demeter (Ceres), antique fresco in Stabiae, 1st century

According to Diodorus Siculus, in his Bibliotheca historica written in the 1st century BC, Demeter and Zeus were also the parents of Dionysus. Diodorus described the myth of Dionysus's double birth (once from the earth, i.e. Demeter, when the plant sprouts) and once from the vine (when the fruit sprouts from the plant). Diodorus also related a version of the myth of Dionysus's destruction by the Titans ("sons of Gaia"), who boiled him, and how Demeter gathered up his remains so that he could be born a third time (Diod. iii.62). Diodorus states that Dionysus's birth from Zeus and his older sister Demeter was somewhat of a minority belief, possibly via conflation of Demeter with her daughter, as most sources state that the parents of Dionysus were Zeus and Persephone, and later Zeus and Semele.

In Arcadia, a major Arcadian deity known as Despoina ("Mistress") was said to be the daughter of Demeter and Poseidon. According to Pausanias, a Thelpusian tradition said that during Demeter's search for Persephone, Poseidon pursued her. Demeter turned into a horse to avoid her younger brother's advances. However, he turned into a stallion and mated with the goddess, resulting in the birth of the horse god Arion and a daughter "whose name they are not wont to divulge to the uninitiated". Elsewhere, he says that the Phigalians assert that the offspring of Poseidon and Demeter was not a horse, but Despoina, "as the Arcadians call her".

In Orphic literature, Demeter seems to be the mother of the witchcraft goddess Hecate.

Both Homer and Hesiod, writing c. 700 BC, described Demeter having sex with the agricultural hero Iasion in a ploughed field during the marriage of Cadmus and Harmonia. According to Hesiod, this union resulted in the birth of Plutus.

Demeter took Mecon, a young Athenian, as a lover; he was at some point transformed into a poppy flower.

The following is a list of Demeter's offspring, by various fathers. Beside each offspring, the earliest source to record the parentage is given, along with the century to which the source (in some cases approximately) dates.

Offspring	Father	Source	Date
Persephone	Zeus	Hes. Theog.	8th cent. BC
Dionysus	Zeus	Diod. Sic.	1st cent. BC
Arion, Despoina	Poseidon	Paus.	2nd cent. AD
Plutus	Iasion	Hes. Theog.	8th cent. BC
Philomelus	Iasion	Hyg. De astr.	1st cent. BC/AD
Hecate	No father mentioned	Orphic frr.	
Eubuleus	No father mentioned	Diod. Sic.	1st cent. BC

=== Abduction of Persephone ===
Demeter drives her horse-drawn chariot containing her daughter Persephone-Kore at Selinunte, Sicily, 6th century BC.

Demeter searched for her missing daughter Persephone ceaselessly for nine days, preoccupied with her grief. Hecate then approached her and said that while she had not seen what happened to Persephone, she heard her screams. Together the two goddesses went to Helios, the sun god, who witnessed everything that happened on earth thanks to his lofty position. Helios then revealed to Demeter that her brother Hades, god of the Underworld, had snatched a screaming Persephone to make her his wife with the permission of Zeus, the girl's father. Demeter was then filled with grief "even more terrible than before", and so the seasons halted and all living things ceased their growth and began to die.

Faced with the loss of sacrificial offerings for Olympus, Zeus sent his messenger Hermes to the Underworld to bring Persephone back to her mother. But before releasing her, Hades tricked or forced her to eat a small number of pomegranate seeds. This act bound her to the Underworld for certain months of every year, for reasons often unexplained but sometimes called a decree of the Fates.

The months Persephone spent in the underworld were most likely during the dry Mediterranean summer, when plant life is threatened by drought, despite the popular belief that it is autumn or winter. There are several variations on the basic myth; the earliest account, the Homeric Hymn to Demeter, relates that Persephone is secretly slipped a pomegranate seed by Hades and in Ovid's version, Persephone secretly eats the pomegranate seeds, thinking to deceive Hades, but she was discovered and made to stay. Contrary to popular perception, Persephone's time in the Underworld does not correspond with the unfruitful seasons of the ancient Greek calendar, nor her return to the upper world with springtime. Demeter's descent to retrieve Persephone from the Underworld is connected to the Eleusinian Mysteries.

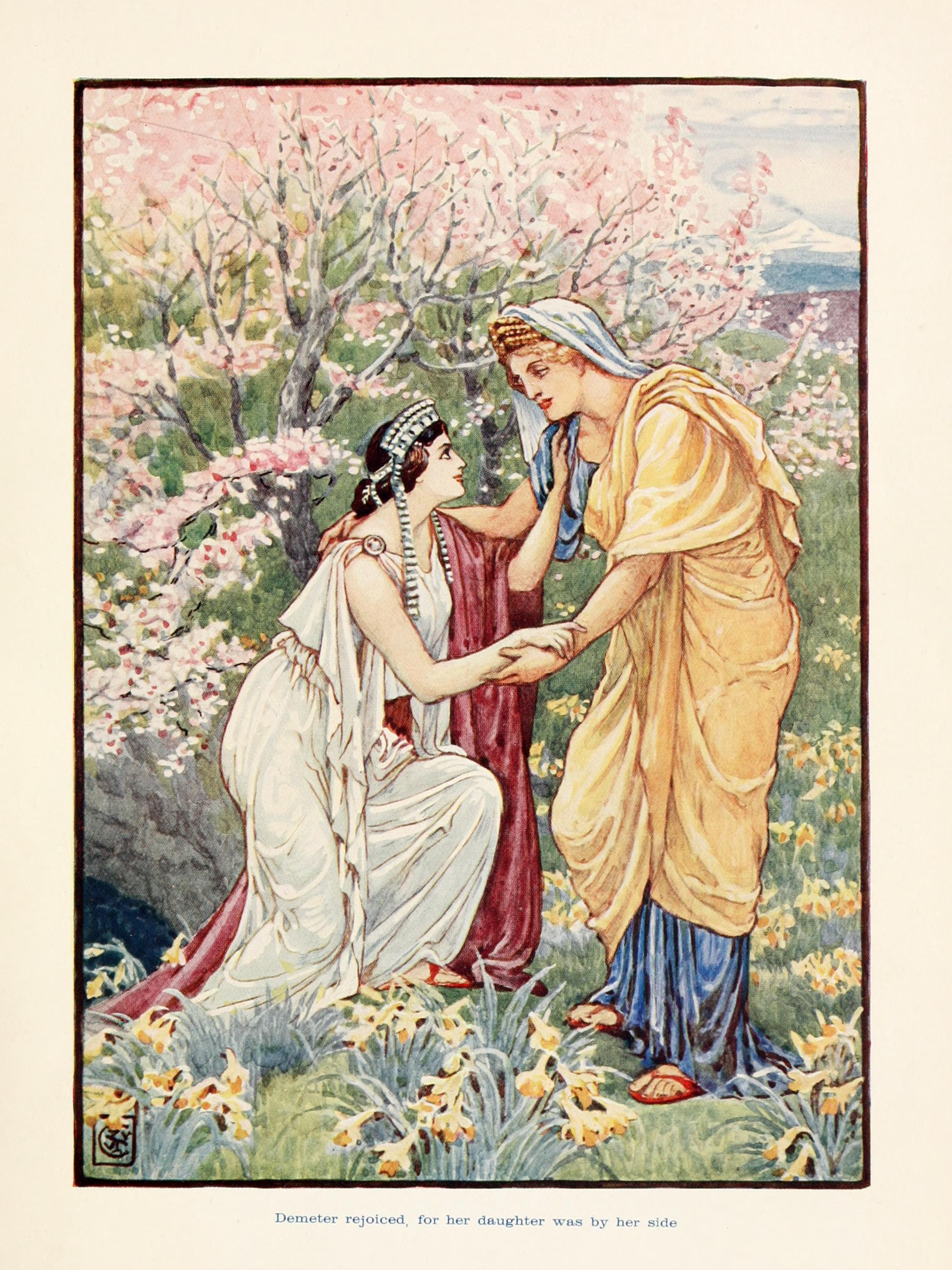
Demeter rejoiced, for her beloved daughter was by her side.

The myth of the capture of Persephone seems to be pre-Greek. In the Greek version, Ploutos (πλούτος, wealth) represents the wealth of the corn that was stored in underground silos or ceramic jars (pithoi). Similar subterranean pithoi were used in ancient times for funerary practices. At the beginning of the autumn, when the corn of the old crop is laid on the fields, she ascends and is reunited with her mother, Demeter, for at this time, the old crop and the new meet each other.

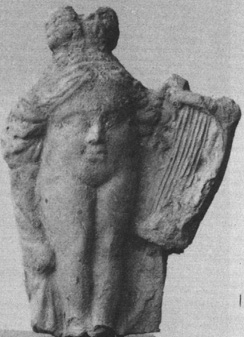
A Greek terracotta figurine of Baubo, of the face-in-torso type

In the Orphic tradition, while she was searching for her daughter, a mortal woman named Baubo received Demeter as her guest and offered her a meal and wine. Demeter declined them both because she mourned the loss of Persephone. Baubo then, thinking she had displeased the goddess, lifted her skirt and showed her genitalia to the goddess, simultaneously revealing Iacchus, Demeter's son. Demeter was most pleased with the sight and delighted she accepted the food and wine. This tale survives in the account of Clement of Alexandria, an early Christian writer who wrote about pagan practices and mythology. Several Baubo figurines (figurines of women revealing their vulvas) have been discovered, supporting the story.

=== Demeter at Eleusis ===
Demeter's search for her daughter Persephone took her to the palace of Celeus, the King of Eleusis in Attica. She assumed the form of an old woman and asked him for shelter. He took her in, to nurse Demophon and Triptolemus, his sons by Metanira. To reward his kindness, she planned to make Demophon immortal; she secretly anointed the boy with ambrosia and laid him in the hearth's flames to gradually burn away his mortal self. But Metanira walked in, saw her son in the fire and screamed in fright. Demeter abandoned the attempt. Instead, once Persephone returned from the underworld, she and Demeter taught Triptolemus the secrets of agriculture, and he, in turn, taught them to any who wished to learn them. Thus, humanity learned how to plant, grow and harvest grain. The myth has several versions; some are linked to figures such as Eleusis, Rarus and Trochilus. The Demophon element may be based on an earlier folk tale.

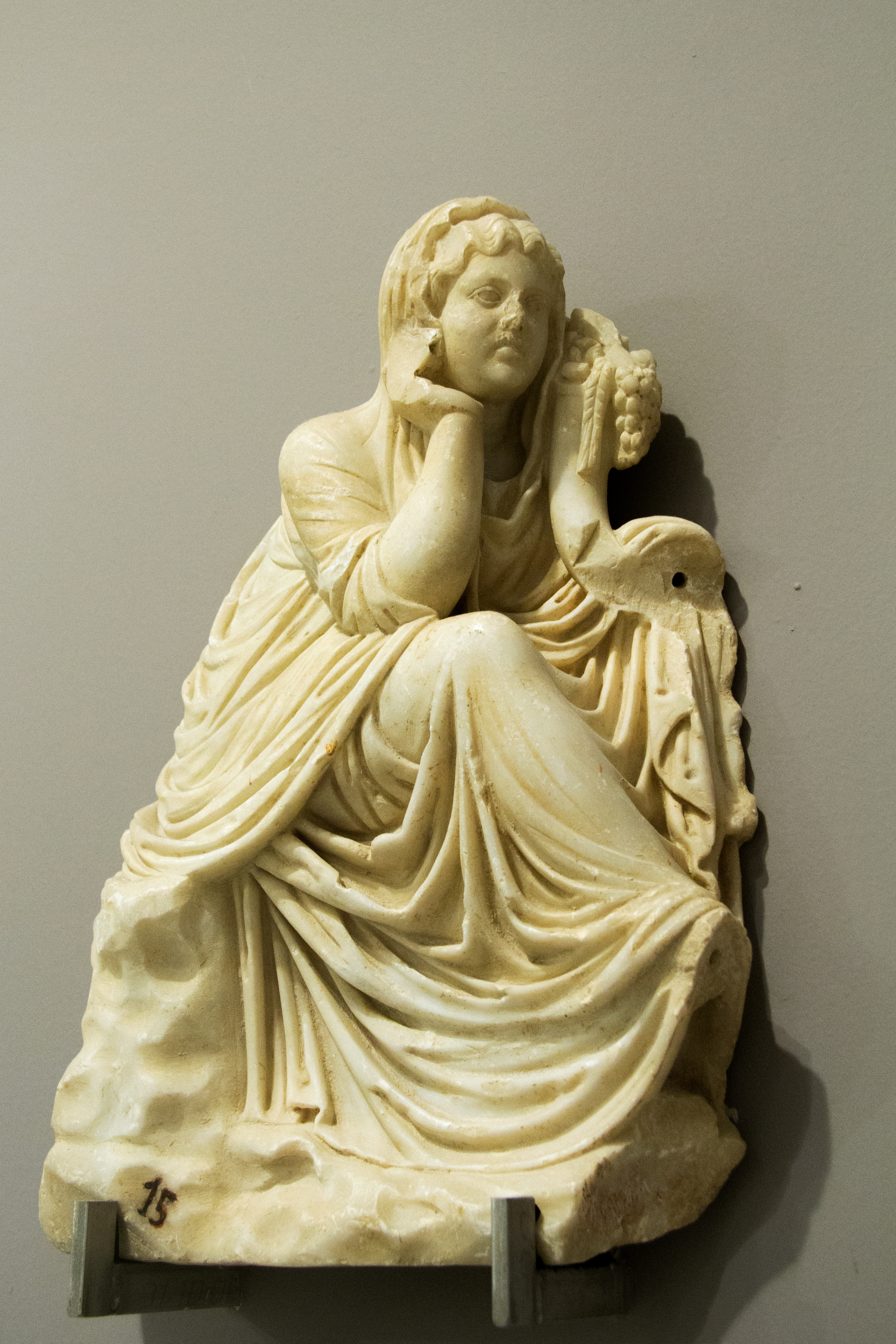
Demeter in mourning, marble relief from Knossos, Archaeological Museum of Heraklion.

=== Demeter and Iasion ===
Homer's Odyssey (c. late 8th century BC) contains perhaps the earliest direct references to the myth of Demeter and her consort Iasion, a Samothracian hero whose name may refer to bindweed, a small white flower that frequently grows in wheat fields. In the Odyssey, Calypso describes how Demeter, "without disguise", had sex with Iasion. "So it was when Demeter of the braided tresses followed her heart and lay in love with Iasion in the triple-furrowed field; Zeus was aware of it soon enough and hurled the bright thunderbolt and killed him." However, Ovid states that Iasion lived up to old age as the husband of Demeter. In ancient Greek culture, part of the opening of each agricultural year involved the cutting of three furrows in the field to ensure its fertility.

Hesiod expanded on the basics of this myth. According to him, the liaison between Demeter and Iasion took place at the wedding of Cadmus and Harmonia in Crete. Demeter, in this version, had lured Iasion away from the other revellers. Hesiod says that Demeter subsequently gave birth to Plutus.

=== Demeter and Poseidon ===
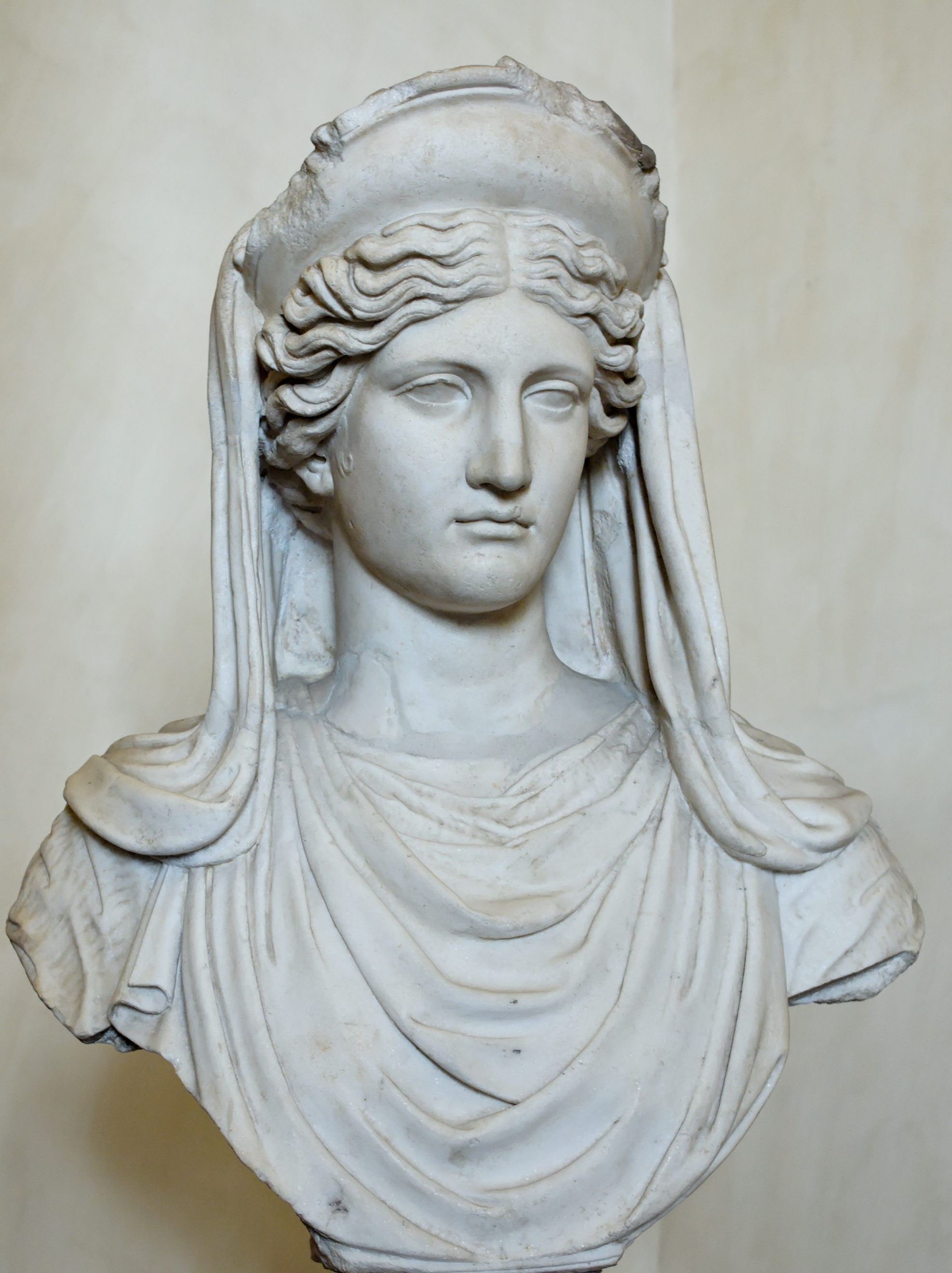
Roman copy of a 4th century BC Greek bust of Demeter (National Roman Museum).

In Arcadia, located in what is now southern Greece, the major goddess Despoina was considered the daughter of Demeter and Poseidon Hippios ("Horse-Poseidon"). In the associated myths, Poseidon represents the river spirit of the Underworld, and he appears as a horse, as often happens in northern European folklore. The myth describes how he pursued his older sister, Demeter, who hid from him among the horses of the king Onkios, but even in the form of a mare, she could not conceal her divinity. Poseidon caught and raped his older sister in the form of a stallion. Demeter was furious at Poseidon's assault; in this furious form, she became known as Demeter Erinys. Her anger at Poseidon drove her to dress all in black and retreat into a cave to purify herself, an act which was the cause of a universal famine. Demeter's absence caused the death of crops, livestock, and eventually of the people who depended on them (later Arcadian tradition held that it was both her rage at Poseidon and her loss of her daughter caused the famine, merging the two myths). Demeter washed away her anger in the River Ladon, becoming Demeter Lousia, the "bathed Demeter".

"In her alliance with Poseidon," Kerényi noted, "she was Earth, who bears plants and beasts, and could therefore assume the shape of an ear of grain or a mare." Moreover, she bore a daughter Despoina (Δέσποινα: the "Mistress"), whose name should not be uttered outside the Arcadian Mysteries, and a horse named Arion, with a black mane and tail.

At Phigaleia, a xoanon (wood-carved statue) of Demeter was erected in a cave which, tradition held, was the cave into which Black Demeter retreated. The statue depicted a Medusa-like figure with a horse's head and snake-like hair, holding a dove and a dolphin, which probably represented her power over air and water:

The second mountain, Mount Elaius, is some thirty stades away from Phigalia, and has a cave sacred to Demeter surnamed Black ... the Phigalians say, they concluded that this cavern was sacred to Demeter and set up in it a wooden image. The image, they say, was made after this fashion. It was seated on a rock, like to a woman in all respects save the head. She had the head and hair of a horse, and there grew out of her head images of serpents and other beasts. Her tunic reached right to her feet; on one of her hands was a dolphin, on the other a dove. Now why they had the image made after this fashion is plain to any intelligent man who is learned in traditions. They say that they named her Black because the goddess had black apparel. They cannot relate either who made this wooden image or how it caught fire. But the old image was destroyed, and the Phigalians gave the goddess no fresh image, while they neglected for the most part her festivals and sacrifices, until the barrenness fell on the land.

— Pausanias, 8.42.1–4.

=== Demeter and Erysichthon ===
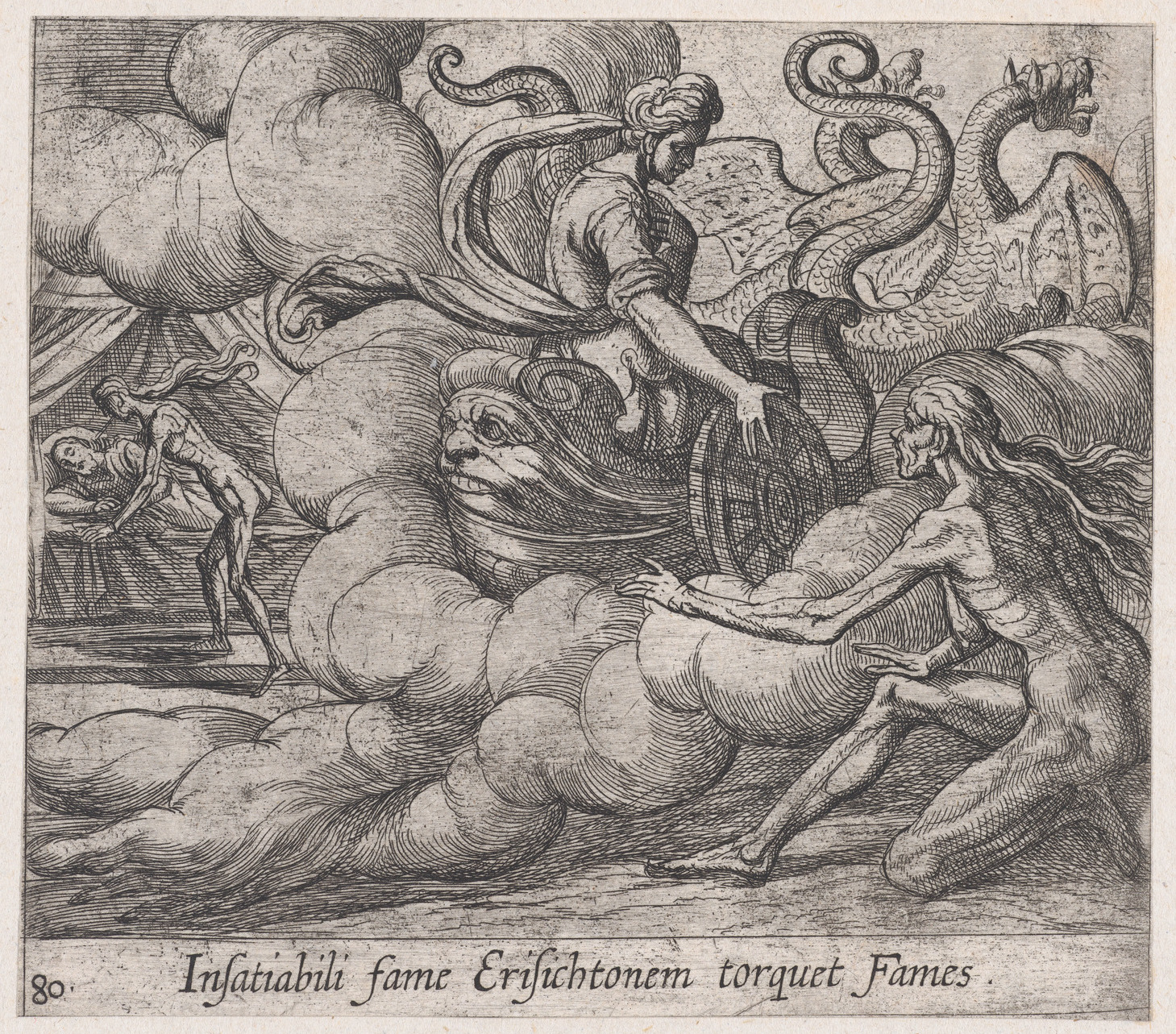
An Italian print (1603) of Demeter ordering Famine to strike Erysichthon.

Another myth involving Demeter's rage resulting in famine is that of Erysichthon, king of Thessaly. The myth tells of Erysichthon ordering all of the trees in one of Demeter's sacred groves to be cut down, as he wanted to build an extension of his palace and hold feasts there. One tree, a huge oak, was covered with votive wreaths, symbols of the prayers Demeter had granted, so Erysichthon's men refused to cut it down. The king used an axe to cut it down, killing a dryad nymph in the process. The nymph's dying words were a curse on Erysichthon. Demeter punished the king by calling upon Limos, the spirit of unrelenting and insatiable hunger, to enter his stomach. The more the king ate, the hungrier he became. Erysichthon sold all his possessions to buy food but was still hungry. Finally, he sold his daughter, Mestra, into slavery. Mestra was freed from slavery by her former lover, Poseidon, who gave her the gift of shape-shifting into any creature to escape her bonds. Erysichthon used her shape-shifting ability to sell her numerous times to make more money to feed himself, but no amount of food was enough. Eventually, Erysichthon ate himself.

In a variation, Erysichthon tore down a temple of Demeter, wishing to build a roof for his house; she punished him the same way, and near the end of his life, she sent a snake to plague him. Afterwards, Demeter put him among the stars (the constellation Ophiuchus), as she did the snake, to continue to inflict its punishment on Erysichthon.

In the Pergamon Altar, which depicts the battle of the gods against the Giants (Gigantomachy), survive remains of what seems to have been Demeter fighting a Giant labelled "Erysichthon." Demeter is also depicted fighting against the Giants next to Hermes in the Suessula Gigantomachy vase, now housed in the Louvre Museum. Usually, ancient depictions of the Gigantomachy tend to exclude Demeter due to her non-martial nature.

=== Wrath myths ===
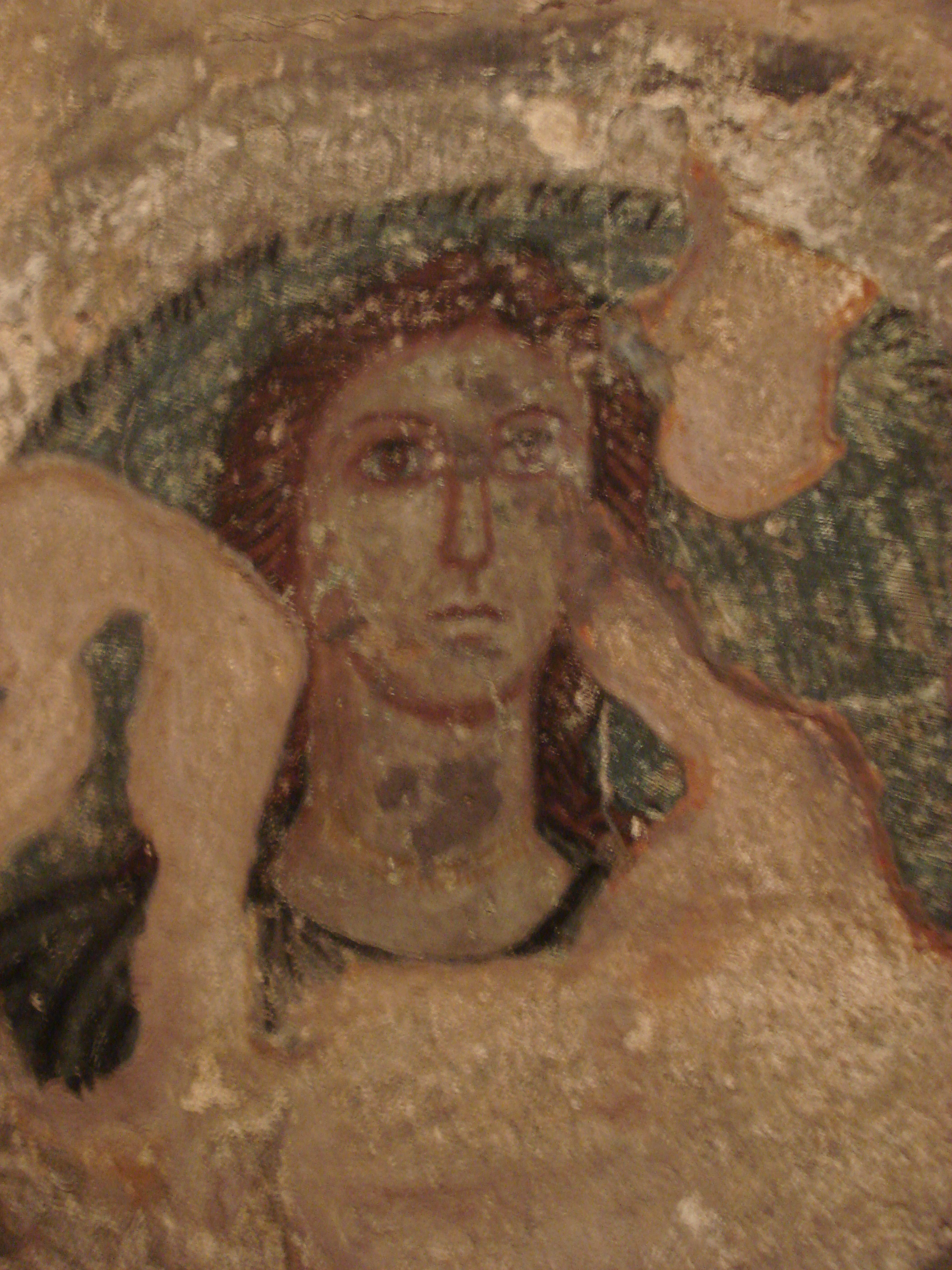
Demeter in an ancient Greek fresco from Panticapaeum, 1st century Crimea.

According to Ovid, Demeter gave the Sirens, the companions of Persephone, wings to search for her daughter when she was abducted by Hades. However, the Fabulae of Hyginus has Demeter cursing the sirens for failing to intervene in the abduction of Persephone.

While travelling far and wide looking for her daughter, Demeter arrived exhausted in Attica. A woman named Misme took her in and offered her a cup of water with pennyroyal and barley groats, for it was a hot day. Demeter, in her thirst, swallowed the drink clumsily. Witnessing that, Misme's son Ascalabus laughed, mocked her, and asked her if she would like a deep jar of that drink. Demeter then poured her drink over him and turned him into a gecko, hated by both men and gods. It was said that Demeter showed her favour to those who killed geckos.

Demeter pinned Ascalaphus under a rock for reporting, as sole witness, to Hades that Persephone had consumed some pomegranate seeds. Later, after Heracles rolled the stone off Ascalaphus, Demeter turned him into a short-eared owl instead. In other versions, Persephone was the one who transformed Ascalaphus into the bird by sprinkling him with water of the river Phlegethon.

Before Hades abducted Persephone, he had kept Minthe as his mistress. But after he married Persephone, he set Minthe aside. Minthe would often brag about being lovelier and more queenly than Persephone and say Hades would soon come back to her and kick Persephone out of his halls. Demeter, hearing that insult towards her daughter, grew angry and trampled Minthe; from the earth then sprang a lovely-smelling herb named after the nymph. In other versions, Persephone herself is the one who kills and turns Minthe into a plant.

In an Argive myth, when Demeter travelled to Argolis, a man named Colontas refused to receive her in his house, whereas his daughter Chthonia disapproved of his actions. Colontas was punished by being burnt along with his house, but Demeter took Chthonia to Hermione, where she built a sanctuary for the goddess.

Once, the Colchian princess Medea ended a famine that plagued Corinth by making sacrifices to Demeter and the nymphs.

=== Favour myths ===
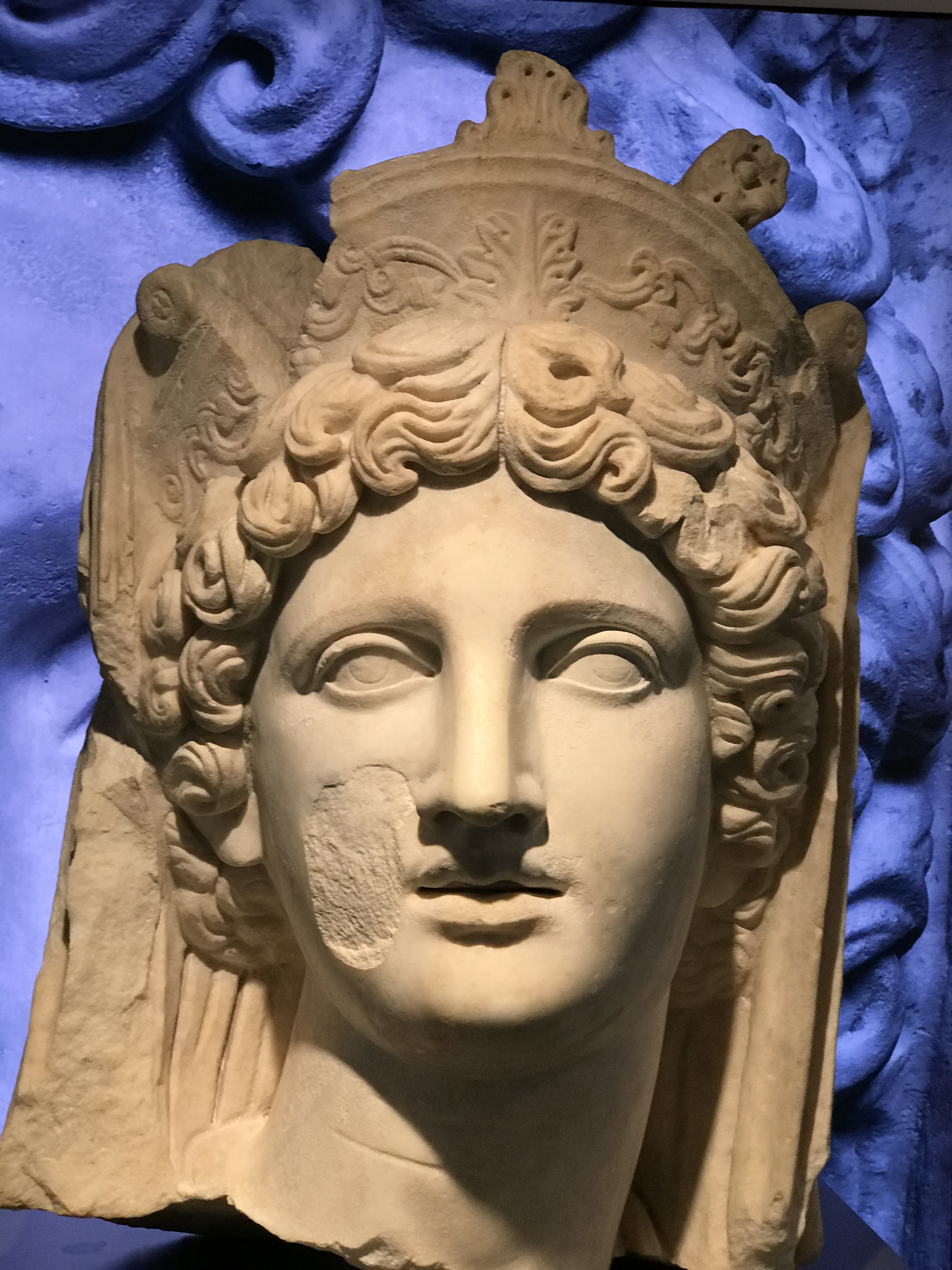
Head of a statue of Demeter, marble, Roman imperial period, 2nd century CE

During her wanderings, Demeter came upon the town of Pheneus; to the Pheneates that received her warmly and offered her shelter, she gave all sorts of pulse, except for beans, deeming it impure. Two of the Pheneates, Trisaules and Damithales, had a temple of Demeter built for her. Demeter also gifted a fig tree to Phytalus, an Eleusinian man, for welcoming her in his home.

Demeter gave Triptolemus her serpent-drawn chariot (one of the serpents that drew this chariot was Kykreides) and seed and bade him scatter it across the earth (teach humankind the knowledge of agriculture). Triptolemus rode through Europe and Asia until he came to the land of Lyncus, a Scythian king. Lyncus pretended to offer what's accustomed of hospitality to him, but once Triptolemus fell asleep, he attacked him with a dagger, wanting to take credit for his work. Demeter then saved Triptolemus by turning Lyncus into a lynx and ordered Triptolemus to return home airborne. Hyginus records a very similar myth, in which Demeter saves Triptolemus from an evil king named Carnabon who additionally seized Triptolemus's chariot and killed one of the dragons, so he might not escape; Demeter restored the chariot to Triptolemus, substituted the dead dragon with another one, and punished Carnabon by putting him among the stars holding a dragon as if to kill it.

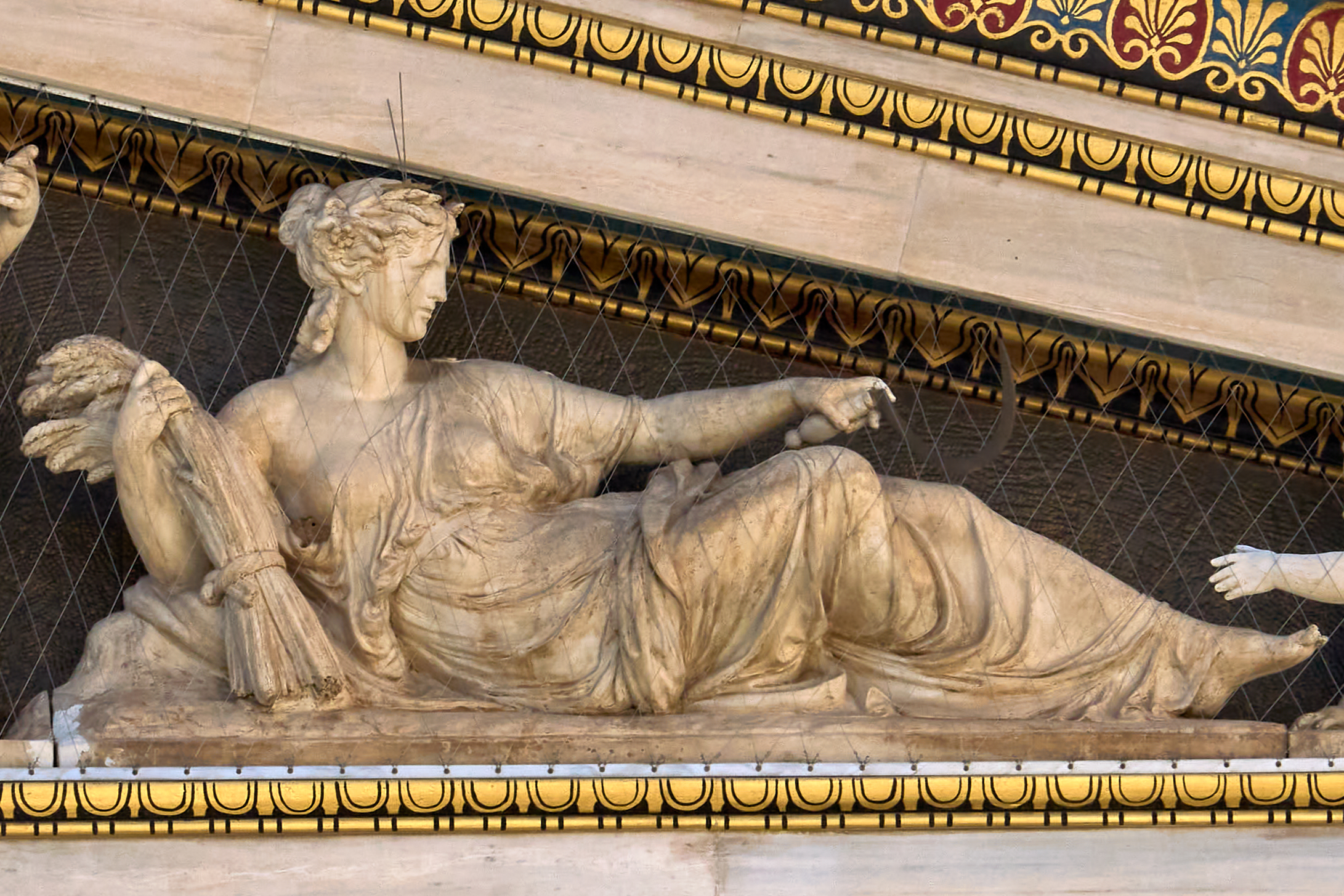
Modern statue of Demeter by Greek sculptor Leonidas Drosis in the facade of the Academy of Athens, Greece.

When her son Philomelus invented the plough and used it to cultivate the fields, Demeter was so impressed by his good work that she immortalized him in the sky by turning him into a constellation, the Boötes.

In the tale of Eros and Psyche, Demeter, along with her sister Hera, visited Aphrodite, raging with fury about the girl who had married her son. Aphrodite asks the two to search for her; the two try to talk sense into her, arguing that her son is not a little boy, although he might appear as one, and there's no harm in him falling in love with Psyche. Aphrodite took offence at their words. Sometime later, Psyche in her wanderings came across an abandoned shrine of Demeter, and sorted out the neglected sickles and harvest implements she found there. As she was doing so, Demeter appeared to her and called from afar; she warned the girl of Aphrodite's great wrath and her plan to take revenge on her. Then Psyche begged the goddess to help her, but Demeter answered that she could not interfere and incur Aphrodite's anger at her, and for that reason, Psyche had to leave the shrine or else be kept as a captive of hers.

Hierax, a man of justice and distinction, set up sanctuaries for Demeter and received plenteous harvests from her in return. When the tribe neglected Poseidon in favour of Demeter, the sea god destroyed all of her crops, so Hierax sent them instead his own food and was transformed into a hawk by Poseidon.

Besides giving gifts to those who were welcoming to her, Demeter was also a goddess who nursed the young; all of Plemaeus's children born by his first wife died in a cradle; Demeter took pity on him and reared herself his son Orthopolis. Plemaeus built a temple to her to thank her. Demeter also raised Trophonius, the prophetic son of either Apollo or Erginus.

=== Other accounts ===
Demeter seems to have accompanied Dionysus when he descended into the Underworld to retrieve his mother Semele in order to visit her now married daughter, and perhaps lead her back to the land of the living for the remainder of the year. In many vases from Athens Dionysus is seen in the company of mother and daughter.

Once Tantalus, a son of Zeus, invited the gods over for dinner. Tantalus, wanting to test them, cut his son Pelops, cooked him and offered him as a meal to them. They all saw through Tantalus's crime except Demeter, who ate Pelops's shoulder before the gods brought him back to life.

== Genealogy ==
Demeter's family tree

Gaia
Uranus
Uranus's genitals	Coeus	Phoebe	Cronus	Rhea
Leto	Zeus	Hera	Poseidon	Hades	DEMETER	Hestia
Apollo	Artemis	a
b
Ares	Hephaestus
Metis
Athena
Maia
Hermes
Semele
Dionysus
Dione
a	b
Aphrodite

== See also ==
- Family tree of the Greek gods
- Greek mythology in popular culture
- Isis and Osiris
- Demophon of Eleusis
