= Cupid and Psyche =

Classical story of Cupid and Psyche

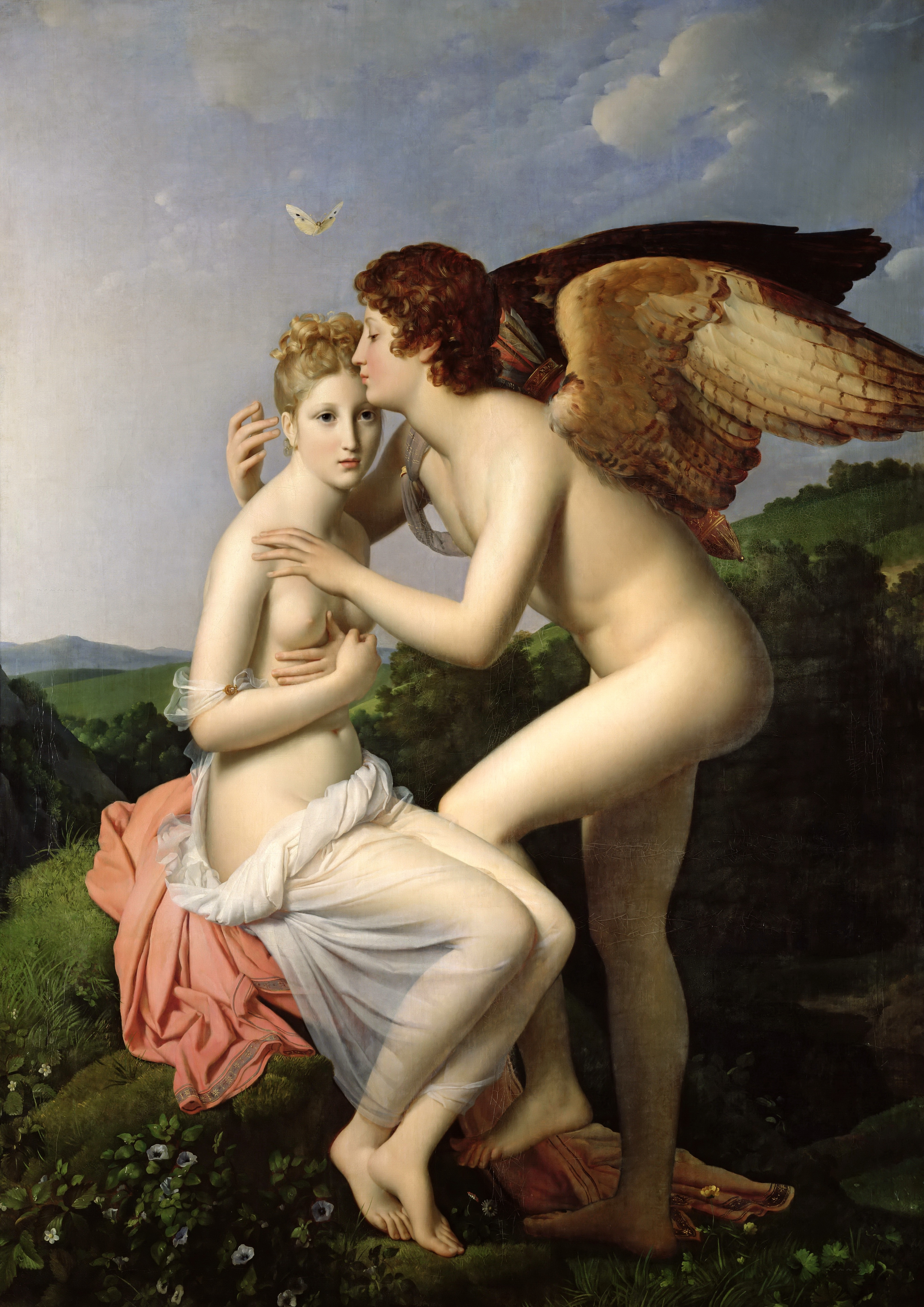
Psyche and Amor, also known as Psyche Receiving Cupid's First Kiss (1798), by François Gérard: a symbolic butterfly hovers over Psyche in a moment of innocence poised before sexual awakening.

Cupid and Psyche is a story originally from Metamorphoses (also called The Golden Ass), written in the 2nd century AD by Lucius Apuleius Madaurensis (or Platonicus). The tale concerns the overcoming of obstacles to the love between Psyche (/ˈsaɪkiː/; Ancient Greek: Ψυχή, lit. 'Soul' or 'Breath of Life', Ancient Greek pronunciation: [psyːkʰɛ̌ː]) and Cupid (Latin: Cupido, lit. 'Desire', Latin pronunciation: [kʊˈpiːd̪oː]) or Amor (lit. 'Love', Greek Eros, Ἔρως), and their ultimate union in a sacred marriage. Although the only extended narrative from antiquity is that of Apuleius from the 2nd century AD, Eros and Psyche appear in Greek art as early as the 4th century BC. The story's Neoplatonic elements and allusions to mystery religions accommodate multiple interpretations, and it has been analyzed as an allegory and in light of folktale, Märchen or fairy tale, and myth.

The story of Cupid and Psyche was known to Boccaccio in c. 1370. The first printed version dates to 1469. Ever since, the reception of Cupid and Psyche in the classical tradition has been extensive. The story has been retold in poetry, drama, and opera, and depicted widely in painting, sculpture, and even wallpaper.

== In Apuleius ==
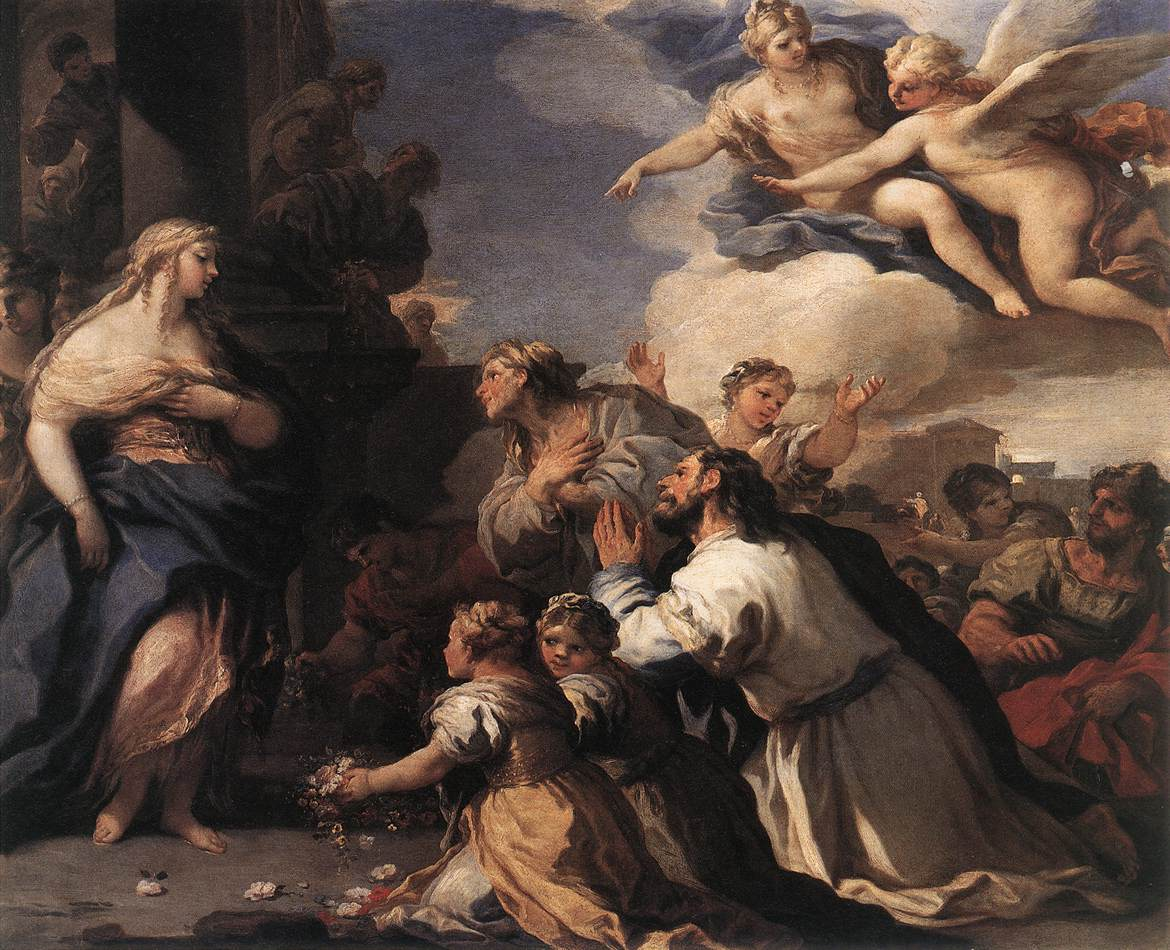
Psyche Honoured by the People (1692–1702) from a series of 12 scenes from the story by Luca Giordano

The tale of Cupid and Psyche (or "Eros and Psyche") is placed at the midpoint of Apuleius's novel, and occupies about a fifth of its total length. The novel itself is a first-person narrative by the protagonist Lucius. Transformed into a donkey by magic gone wrong, Lucius undergoes various trials and adventures, and finally regains human form by eating roses sacred to Isis. Psyche's story has some similarities, including the theme of dangerous curiosity, punishments and tests, and redemption through divine favor.

As a structural mirror of the overarching plot, the tale is an example of mise en abyme. It occurs within a complex narrative frame, with Lucius recounting the tale as it in turn was told by an old woman to Charite, a bride kidnapped by bandits on her wedding day and held captive in a cave. The happy ending for Psyche is supposed to assuage Charite's fear of rape, in one of several instances of Apuleius's irony.

Although the tale resists explication as a strict allegory of a particular Platonic argument, Apuleius drew generally on imagery such as the laborious ascent of the winged soul (Phaedrus 248) and the union with the divine achieved by Soul through the agency of the daemon Love (Symposium 212b).

=== Story ===
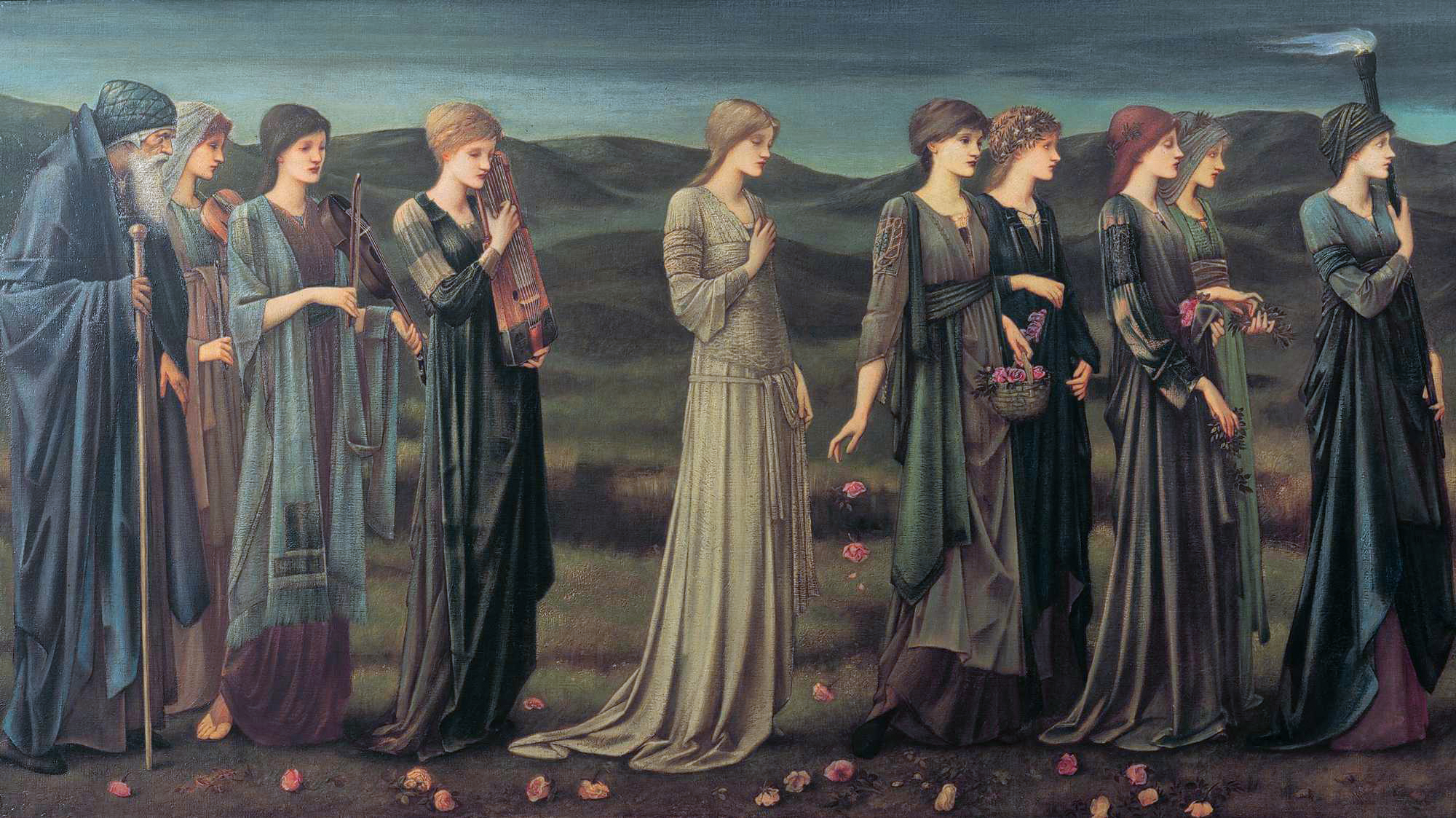
Psyche's Wedding (Pre-Raphaelite, 1895) by Edward Burne-Jones

There were once a king and queen, rulers of an unnamed city, who had three daughters of conspicuous beauty. The youngest and most beautiful was Psyche, whose admirers, neglecting the proper worship of Aphrodite (love goddess Venus), instead prayed and made offerings to her. It was rumored that she was the second coming of Venus, or the daughter of Venus from an unseemly union between the goddess and a mortal. Venus is offended, and commissions Cupid to work her revenge. Cupid is sent to shoot Psyche with an arrow so that she may fall in love with something hideous. He instead scratches himself with his own dart, which makes any living thing fall in love with the first thing it sees. Consequently, he falls deeply in love with Psyche and disobeys his mother's order.

Although her two humanly beautiful sisters have married, the idolized Psyche has yet to find love. Her father suspects that they have incurred the wrath of the gods, and consults the oracle of Apollo. The response is unsettling: the king is to expect not a human son-in-law, but rather a dragon-like creature who harasses the world with fire and iron and is feared by even Jupiter and the inhabitants of the underworld.

Psyche is arrayed in funeral attire, conveyed by a procession to the peak of a rocky crag, and exposed. Marriage and death are merged into a single rite of passage, a "transition to the unknown". Zephyrus the West Wind bears her up to meet her fated match, and deposits her in a lovely meadow (locus amoenus), where she promptly falls asleep.

The transported girl awakes to find herself at the edge of a cultivated grove (lucus). Exploring, she finds a marvelous house with golden columns, a carved ceiling of citrus wood and ivory, silver walls embossed with wild and domesticated animals, and jeweled mosaic floors. A disembodied voice tells her to make herself comfortable, and she is entertained at a feast that serves itself and by singing to an invisible lyre.

Although fearful and without the proper experience, she allows herself to be guided to a bedroom where, in the darkness, a being she cannot see has sex with her. She gradually learns to look forward to his visits, though he always departs before sunrise and forbids her to look upon him. Soon, she becomes pregnant.

==== Violation of trust ====
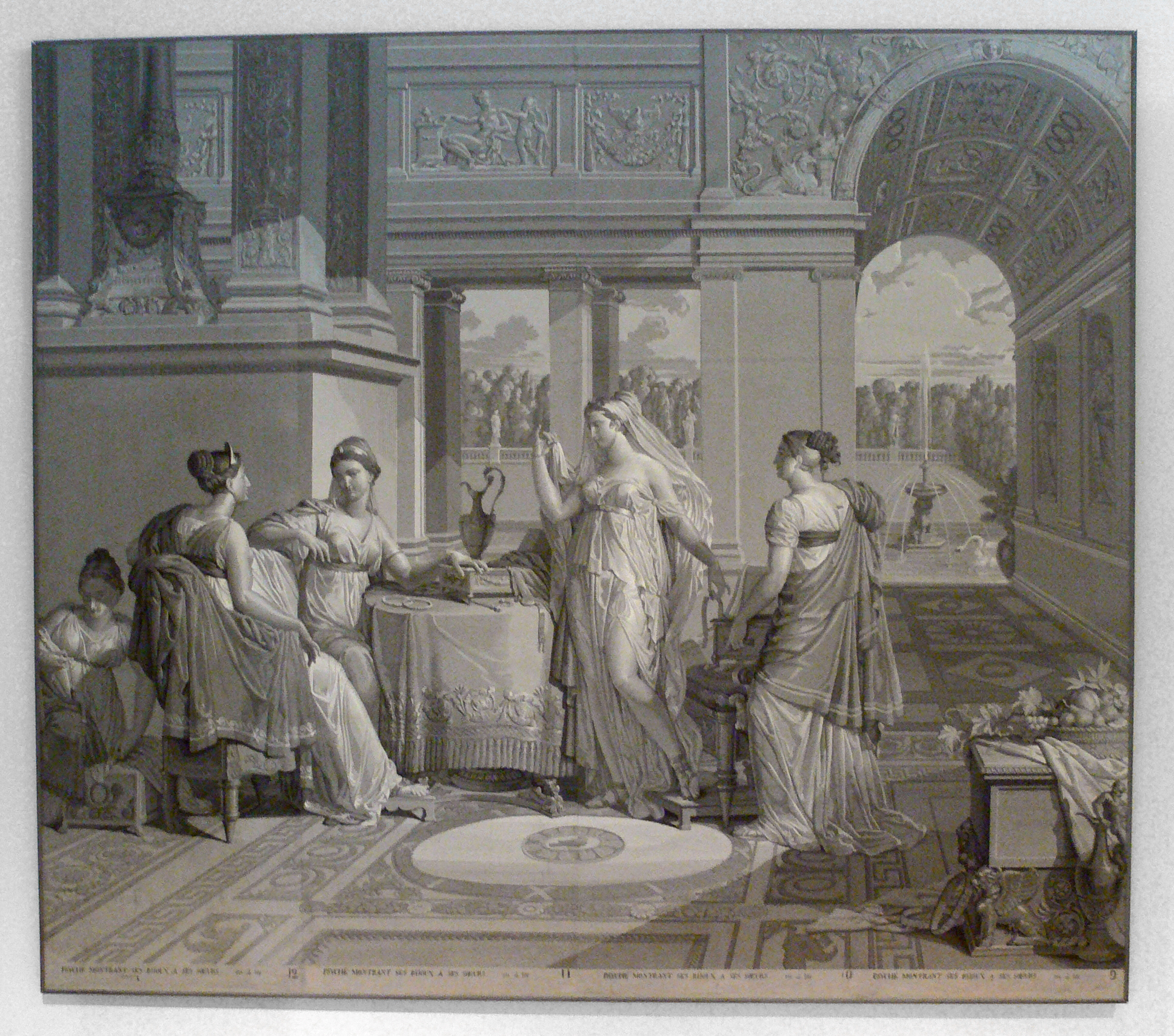
Psyche Showing Her Jewelry to Her Sisters (Neoclassical, 1815–16), grisaille wallpaper by Merry-Joseph Blondel

Psyche's family longs for news of her, and after much cajoling, Cupid, still unknown to his bride, permits Zephyr to carry her sisters up for a visit. When they see the splendor in which Psyche lives, they become envious, and undermine her happiness by prodding her to uncover her husband's true identity, since surely as foretold by the oracle she was lying with the vile winged serpent, who would devour her and her child.

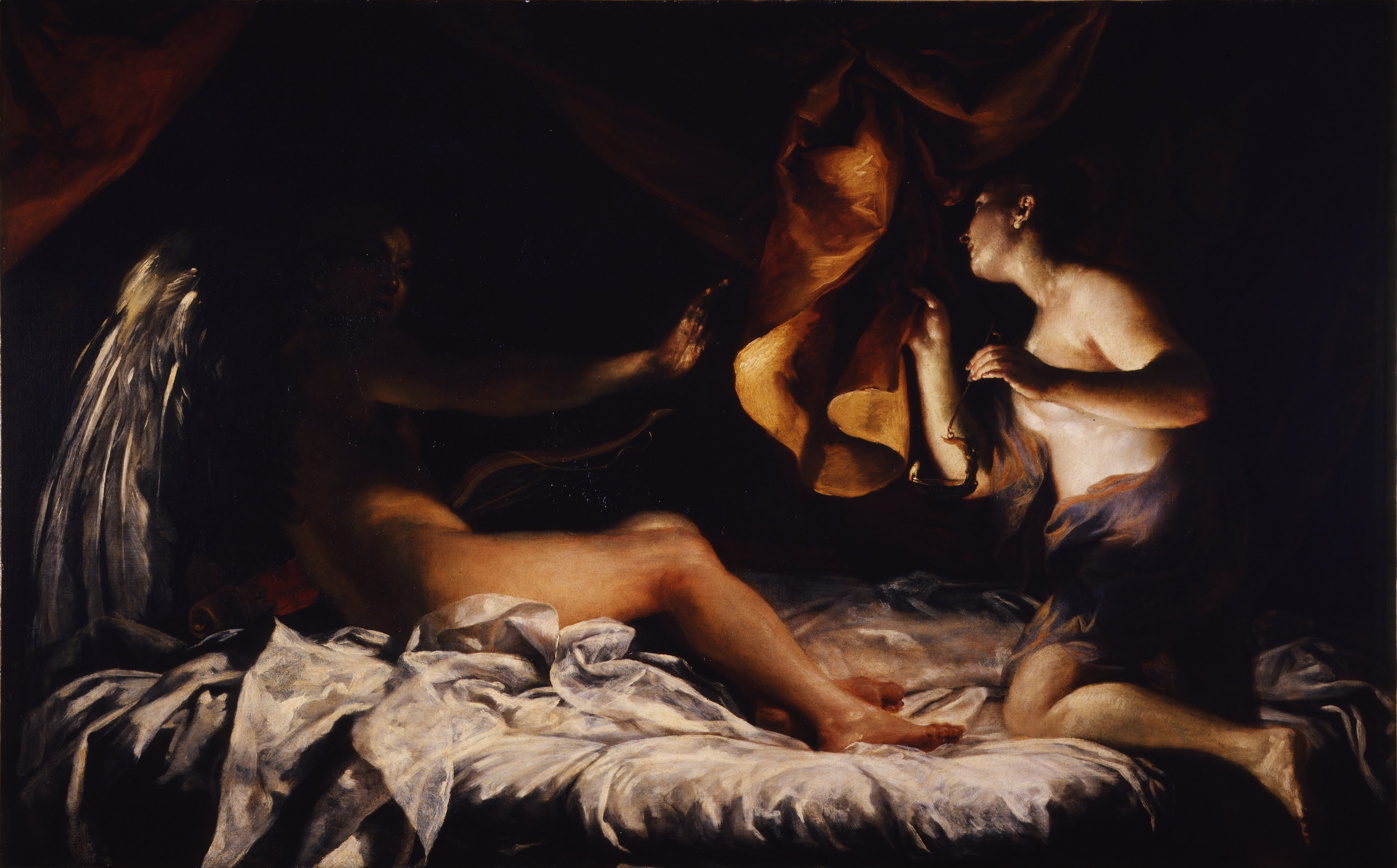
Amore e Psiche (1707–09) by Giuseppe Crespi: Psyche's use of the lamp to see the god is sometimes thought to reflect the magical practice of lychnomancy, a form of divination or spirit conjuring.

One night after Cupid falls asleep, Psyche carries out the plan her sisters devised: she brings out a dagger and a lamp she had hidden in the room, in order to see and kill the monster. But when the light instead reveals the most beautiful creature she has ever seen, she is so startled that she wounds herself on one of the arrows in Cupid's cast-aside quiver. Struck with a feverish passion, she spills hot oil from the lamp and wakes him. He flees, and though she tries to pursue, he flies away and leaves her on the bank of a river.

There she is discovered by the wilderness god Pan, who recognizes the signs of passion upon her. She acknowledges his divinity (numen), then begins to wander the earth looking for her lost love.

Psyche visits first one sister, then the other; both are seized with renewed envy upon learning the identity of Psyche's secret husband. Each sister attempts to offer herself as a replacement by climbing the rocky crag and casting herself upon Zephyr for conveyance, but instead is allowed to fall to a brutal death.

==== Wanderings and trials ====
In the course of her wanderings, Psyche comes upon a temple of Ceres, and inside finds a disorder of grain offerings, garlands, and agricultural implements. Recognizing that the proper cultivation of the gods should not be neglected, she puts everything in good order, prompting a theophany of Ceres herself. Although Psyche prays for her aid, and Ceres acknowledges that she deserves it, the goddess is prohibited from helping her against a fellow goddess. A similar incident occurs at a temple of Juno. Psyche realizes that she must serve Venus herself.

Venus revels in having the girl under her power, and turns Psyche over to her two handmaids, Worry and Sadness, to be whipped and tortured. Venus tears her clothes and bashes her head into the ground, and mocks her for conceiving a child in a sham marriage. The goddess then throws before her a great mass of mixed wheat, barley, poppyseed, chickpeas, lentils, and beans, demanding that she sort them into separate heaps by dawn. But when Venus withdraws to attend a wedding feast, a kind ant takes pity on Psyche, and assembles a fleet of insects to accomplish the task. Venus is furious when she returns drunk from the feast, and only tosses Psyche a crust of bread. At this point in the story, it is revealed that Cupid is also in the house of Venus, languishing from his injury.

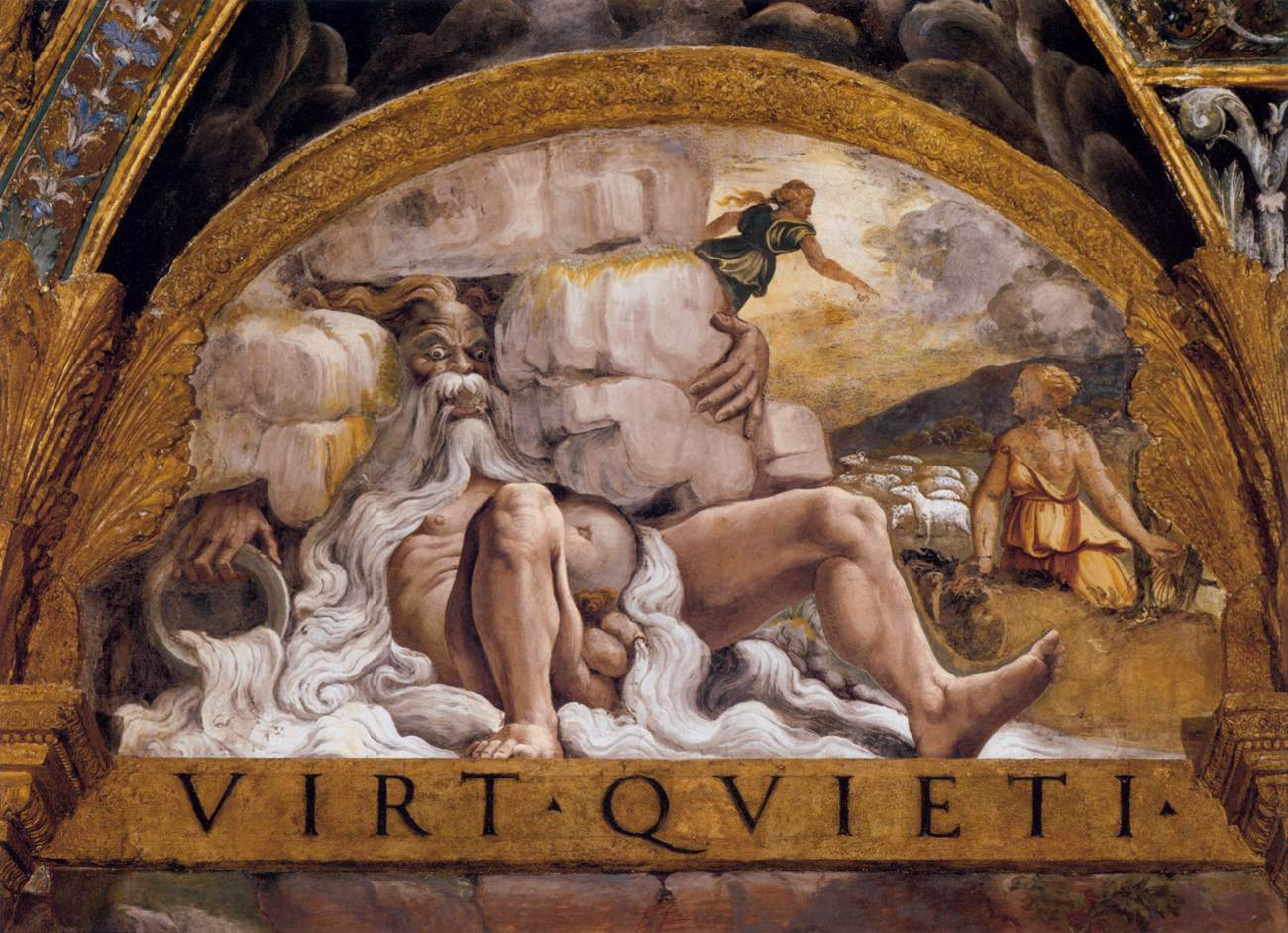
Psyche's Second Task (Mannerist, 1526–28) by Giulio Romano, from the Palazzo del Tè

At dawn, Venus sets a second task for Psyche. She is to cross a river and fetch golden wool from violent sheep who graze on the other side. These sheep are elsewhere identified as belonging to Helios. Psyche's only intention is to drown herself on the way, but instead she is saved by instructions from a divinely inspired reed, of the type used to make musical instruments, and gathers the wool caught on briers.

For Psyche's third task, she is given a crystal vessel in which to collect the black water spewed by the source of the rivers Styx and Cocytus. Climbing the cliff from which it issues, she is daunted by the foreboding air of the place and dragons slithering through the rocks, and falls into despair. Jupiter himself takes pity on her, and sends his eagle to battle the dragons and retrieve the water for her.

==== Psyche and the underworld ====
The last trial Venus imposes on Psyche is a quest to the underworld itself. She is to take a box (pyxis) and obtain in it a dose of the beauty of Proserpina, queen of the underworld. Venus claims her own beauty has faded through tending her ailing son, and she needs this remedy in order to attend the theatre of the gods (theatrum deorum).

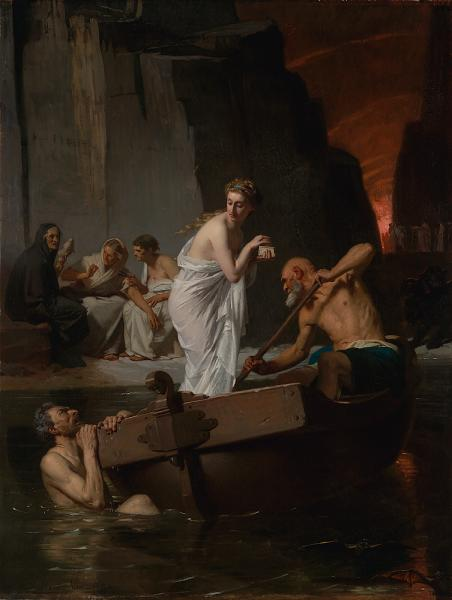
Psyché aux enfers (1865) by Eugène Ernest Hillemacher: Charon rows Psyche past a dead man in the water and the old weavers on shore

Once again despairing of her task, Psyche climbs a tower, planning to throw herself off. The tower, however, suddenly breaks into speech, and advises her to travel to Lacedaemon, Greece, and to seek out the place called Taenarus, where she will find the entrance to the underworld. The tower offers instructions for navigating the underworld:

The airway of Dis is there, and through the yawning gates the pathless route is revealed. Once you cross the threshold, you are committed to the unswerving course that takes you to the very Regia of Orcus. But you shouldn't go emptyhanded through the shadows past this point, but rather carry cakes of honeyed barley in both hands, and transport two coins in your mouth.

The speaking tower warns her to maintain silence as she passes by several ominous figures: a lame man driving a mule loaded with sticks, a dead man swimming in the river that separates the world of the living from the world of the dead, and old women weaving. These, the tower warns, will seek to divert her by pleading for her help: she must ignore them. The cakes are treats for distracting Cerberus, the three-headed watchdog of Orcus, and the two coins for Charon the ferryman, so she can make a return trip.

Everything comes to pass according to plan, and Proserpina grants Psyche's humble entreaty. As soon as she reenters the light of day, however, Psyche is overcome by a bold curiosity, and can't resist opening the box in the hope of enhancing her own beauty. She finds nothing inside but an "infernal and Stygian sleep", which sends her into a deep and unmoving torpor.

==== Reunion and immortal love ====
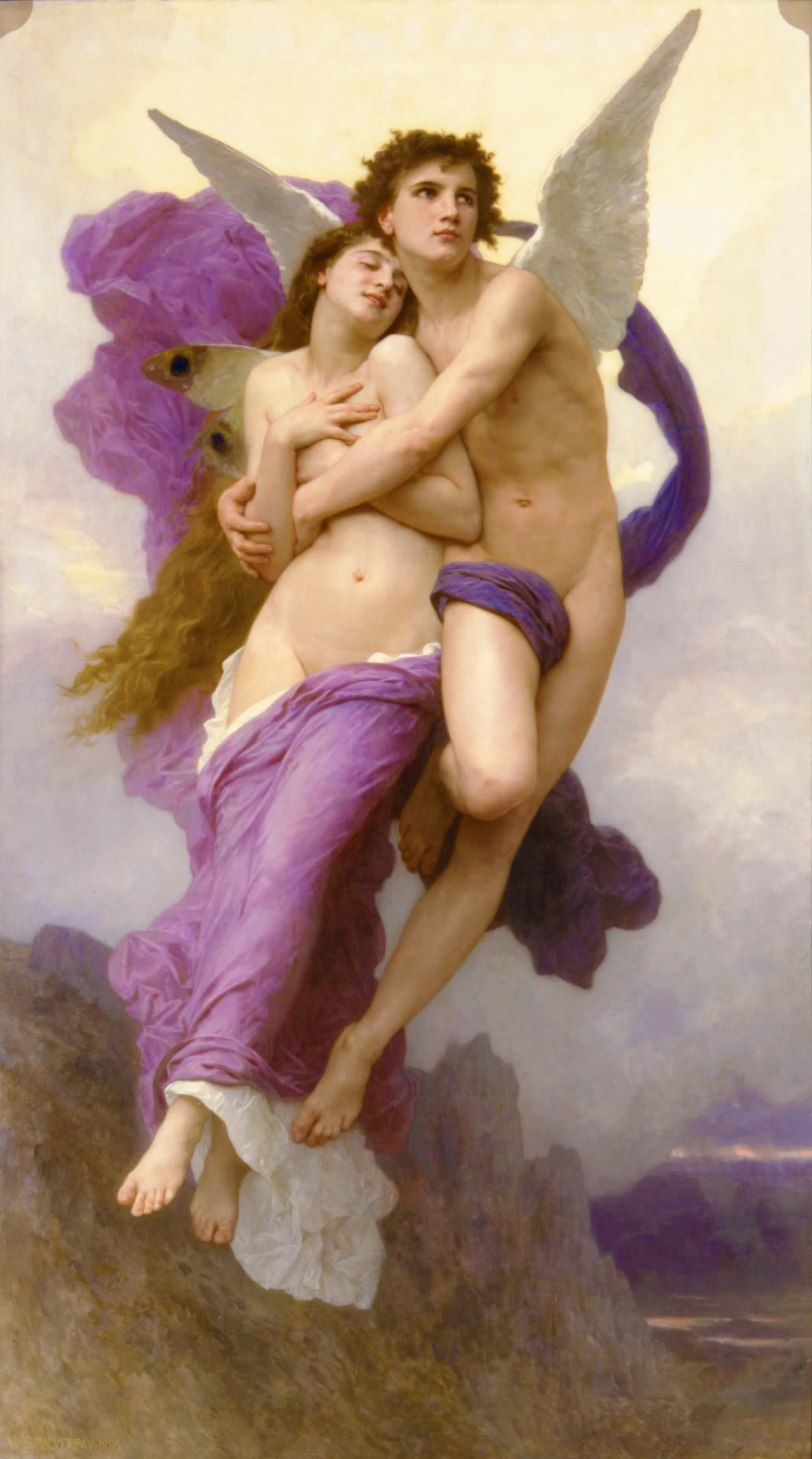
The Abduction of Psyche by William-Adolphe Bouguereau, 1895.

Meanwhile, Cupid's wound has healed into a scar, and he escapes his mother's house by flying out of a window. When he finds Psyche, he draws the sleep from her face and replaces it in the box, then pricks her with an arrow that does no harm. He lifts her into the air, and takes her to present the box to Venus.

He then takes his case to Zeus, who gives his consent in return for Cupid's future help whenever a choice maiden catches his eye. Zeus has Hermes convene an assembly of the gods in the theater of heaven, where he makes a public statement of approval, warns Venus to back off, and gives Psyche ambrosia, the drink of immortality, so the couple can be united in marriage as equals. Their union, he says, will redeem Cupid from his history of provoking adultery and sordid liaisons. Zeus's word is solemnized with a wedding banquet.

With its happy marriage and resolution of conflicts, the tale ends in the manner of classic comedy or Greek romances such as Daphnis and Chloe. The child born to the couple will be Voluptas (Greek Hedone ‘Ηδονή), "Pleasure".

==== The Wedding of Cupid and Psyche ====
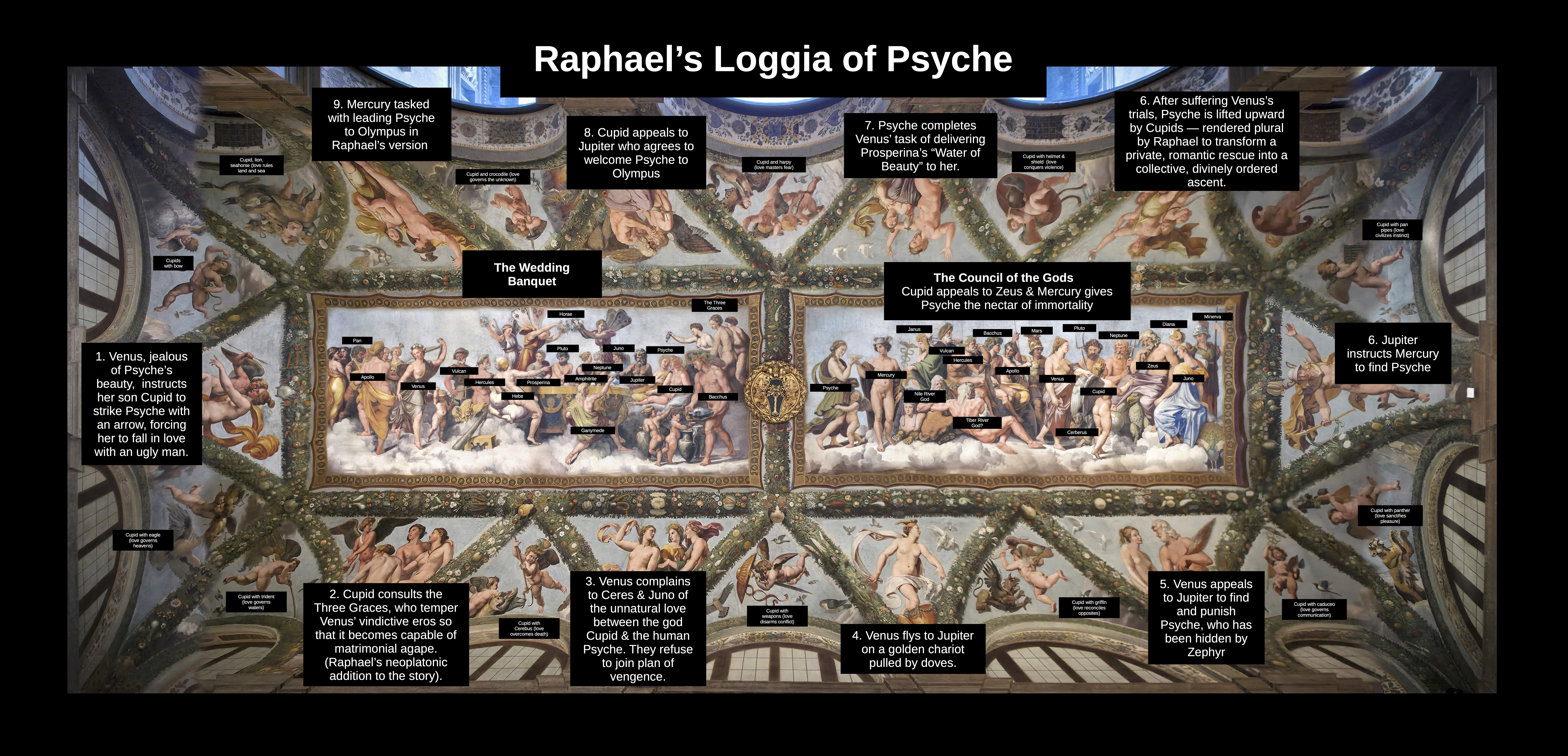
The Wedding Banquet of Cupid and Psyche (1517) by Raphael and his workshop, from the Loggia di Psiche, Villa Farnesina with narrative explanations attached.

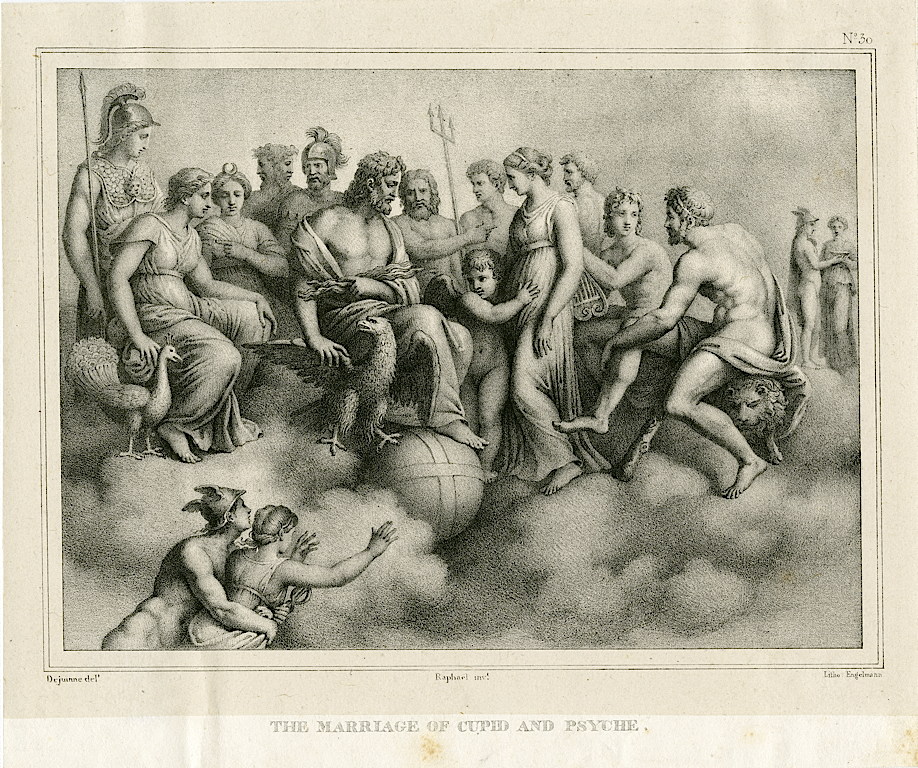
Godefroy Engelmann after Raphael, Marriage of Cupid and Psyche, 1825, lithograph

The assembly of the gods has been a popular subject for both visual and performing arts, with the wedding banquet of Cupid and Psyche a particularly rich occasion. With the wedding of Peleus and Thetis, this is the most common setting for a "Feast of the Gods" scene in art. Apuleius describes the scene in terms of a festive Roman dinner party (cena). Cupid, now a husband, reclines in the place of honor (the "top" couch) and embraces Psyche in his lap. Zeus and Hera situate themselves likewise, and all the other gods are arranged in order. The cupbearer of Jove (Zeus's other Roman name) serves him with nectar, the "wine of the gods"; Apuleius refers to the cupbearer only as ille rusticus puer, "that country boy", and not as Ganymede. Liber, the Roman god of wine, serves the rest of the company. Vulcan, the god of fire, cooks the food; the Horae ("Seasons" or "Hours") adorn, or more literally "empurple", everything with roses and other flowers; the Graces suffuse the setting with the scent of balsam, and the Muses with melodic singing. Apollo sings to his lyre, and Venus takes the starring role in dancing at the wedding, with the Muses as her chorus girls, a satyr blowing the aulos (tibia in Latin), and a young Pan expressing himself through the pan pipes (fistula).

The wedding provides closure for the narrative structure as well as for the love story: the mysteriously provided pleasures Psyche enjoyed in the domus of Cupid at the beginning of her odyssey, when she entered into a false marriage preceded by funeral rites, are reimagined in the hall of the gods following correct ritual procedure for a real marriage. The arranging of the gods in their proper order (in ordinem) would evoke for the Roman audience the religious ceremony of the lectisternium, a public banquet held for the major deities in the form of statues arranged on luxurious couches, as if they were present and participating in the meal.

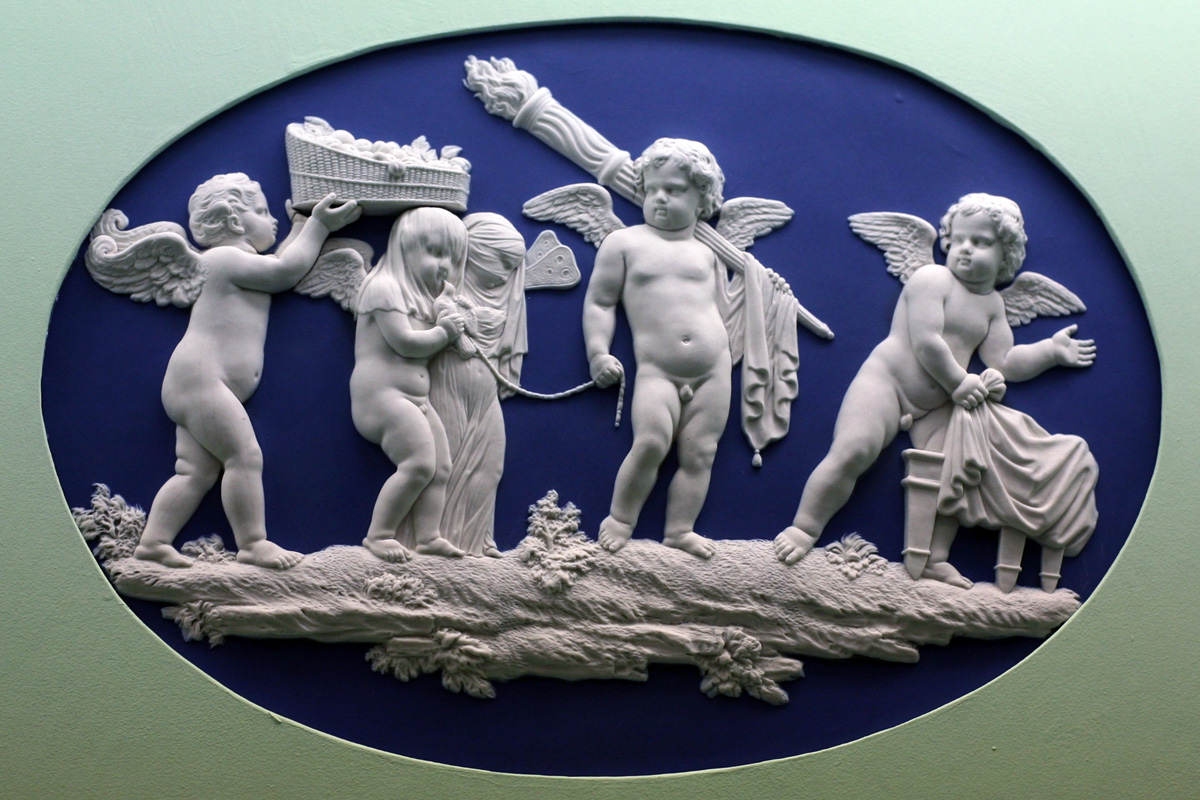
Marriage of Cupid and Psyche (c. 1773), jasperware by Wedgwood based on the 1st-century Marlborough gem, which most likely was intended to depict an initiation rite (Brooklyn Museum)

The wedding banquet was a favored theme for Renaissance art. As early as 1497, Giovanni Sabadino degli Arienti made the banquet central to his description of a now-lost Cupid and Psyche cycle at the Villa Belriguardo, near Ferrara. At the Villa Farnesina in Rome, it is one of two main scenes for the Loggia di Psiche (ca. 1518) by Raphael and his workshop, as well as for the Stanza di Psiche (1545–46) by Perino del Vaga at the Castel Sant' Angelo. Hendrick Goltzius introduced the subject to northern Europe with his "enormous" engraving called The Wedding of Cupid and Psyche (1587, 43 by 85.4 cm), which influenced how other northern artists depicted assemblies of the gods in general. The engraving in turn had been taken from Bartholomaeus Spranger's 1585 drawing of the same title, considered a "locus classicus of Dutch Mannerism" and discussed by Karel Van Mander for its exemplary composition involving numerous figures.

In the 18th century, François Boucher's Marriage of Cupid and Psyche (1744) affirmed Enlightenment ideals with the authority figure Jupiter presiding over a marriage of lovely equals. The painting reflects the Rococo taste for pastels, fluid delicacy, and amorous scenarios infused with youth and beauty.

== As allegory ==
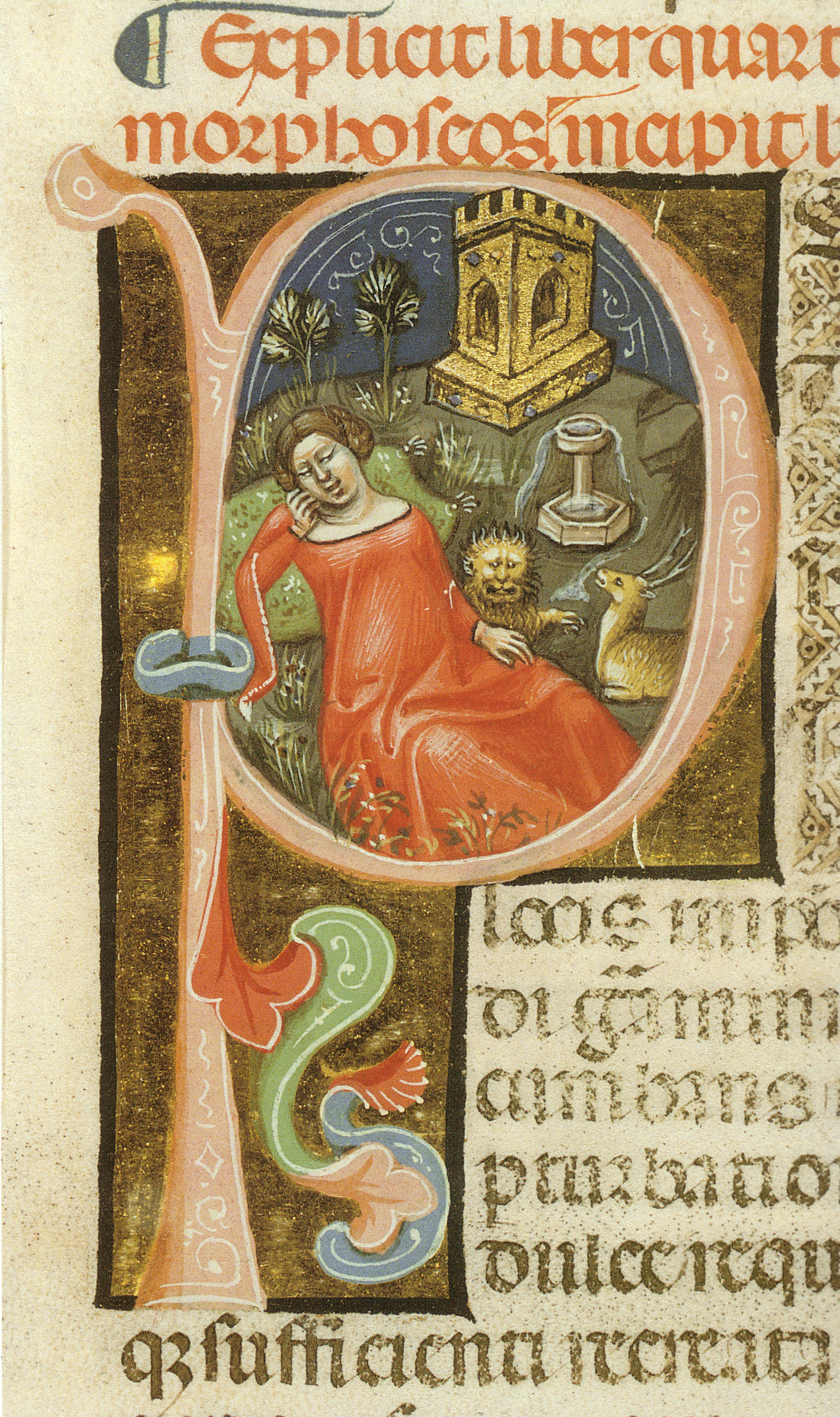
Psyche in the grove of Cupid, 1345 illustration of the Metamorphoses, Biblioteca Apostolica Vaticana

The story of Cupid and Psyche was readily allegorized. In late antiquity, Martianus Capella (5th century) refashions it as an allegory about the fall of the human soul. For Apuleius, immortality is granted to the soul of Psyche as a reward for commitment to sexual love. In the version of Martianus, sexual love draws Psyche into the material world that is subject to death: "Cupid takes Psyche from Virtue and shackles her in adamantine chains".

The tale thus lent itself to adaptation in a Christian or mystical context, often as symbolic of the soul. In the Gnostic text On the Origin of the World, the first rose is created from the blood of Psyche when she loses her virginity to Cupid. To the Christian mythographer Fulgentius (6th century), Psyche was an Adam figure, driven by sinful curiosity and lust from the paradise of Love's domain. Psyche's sisters are Flesh and Free Will, and her parents are God and Matter. To Boccaccio (14th century), the marriage of Cupid and Psyche symbolized the union of soul and God.

The allure to interpret the story as a religious or philosophical allegory can still be found in modern scholarship. Psyche by her very name represents the aspirations of the human soul—towards a divine love personified in Cupid. This simplistic interpretation overlooks the original characterisation of Cupid as a corrupter who delights in disrupting marriages (The Golden Ass IV. 30) and was "notorious for his adulteries" (VI. 23), as well as the descriptions of his sensual unions with Psyche (V. 13), the aid Jupiter offers to Cupid in return for a new girl that Jupiter may seduce (VI. 22), and the name given to Cupid and Psyche's child (Voluptas/Pleasure). However, when he admits that "I [Cupid], the famed archer, wounded myself with my own weapon, and made you [Psyche] my wife" (V. 24), having cut himself on his own magic arrow (which induces passionate love for the first person the victim lays eyes on), the temptation for an allegorical interpretation of the story becomes somewhat complexified but not inherently contradictory or unsubstantiated. The arrows of desire make it so that the victim cannot be satisfied with anyone except the sole target of their newfound affections; thus, Cupid's former predilections no longer occupy the same prominence they once held in his character, so that he changes from a wanton homewrecker to a devoted husband by the end of the narrative.

== Classical tradition ==
Apuleius's novel was among the ancient texts that made the crucial transition from roll to codex form when it was edited at the end of the 4th century. It was known to Latin writers such as Augustine of Hippo, Macrobius, Sidonius Apollinaris, Martianus Capella, and Fulgentius, but toward the end of the 6th century lapsed into obscurity and survived what was formerly known as the "Dark Ages" through perhaps a single manuscript. The Metamorphoses remained unknown in the 13th century, but copies began to circulate in the mid-1300s among the early humanists of Florence. Boccaccio's text and interpretation of Cupid and Psyche in his Genealogia deorum gentilium (written in the 1370s and published 1472) was a major impetus to the reception of the tale in the Italian Renaissance and to its dissemination throughout Europe.

One of the most popular images from the tale was Psyche's discovery of a naked Cupid sleeping, found in ceramics, stained glass, and frescos. Mannerist painters were intensely drawn to the scene. In England, the Cupid and Psyche theme had its "most lustrous period" from 1566 to 1635, beginning with the first English translation by William Adlington. A fresco cycle for Hill Hall, Essex, was modeled indirectly after that of the Villa Farnesina around 1570, and Thomas Heywood's masque Love's Mistress dramatized the tale to celebrate the wedding of Charles I and Henrietta Maria, who later had her withdrawing chamber decorated with a 22-painting Cupid and Psyche cycle by Jacob Jordaens. The cycle took the divinization of Psyche as the centerpiece of the ceiling, and was a vehicle for the Neoplatonism the queen brought with her from France. The Cupid and Psyche produced by Orazio Gentileschi for the royal couple shows a fully robed Psyche whose compelling interest is psychological, while Cupid is mostly nude.

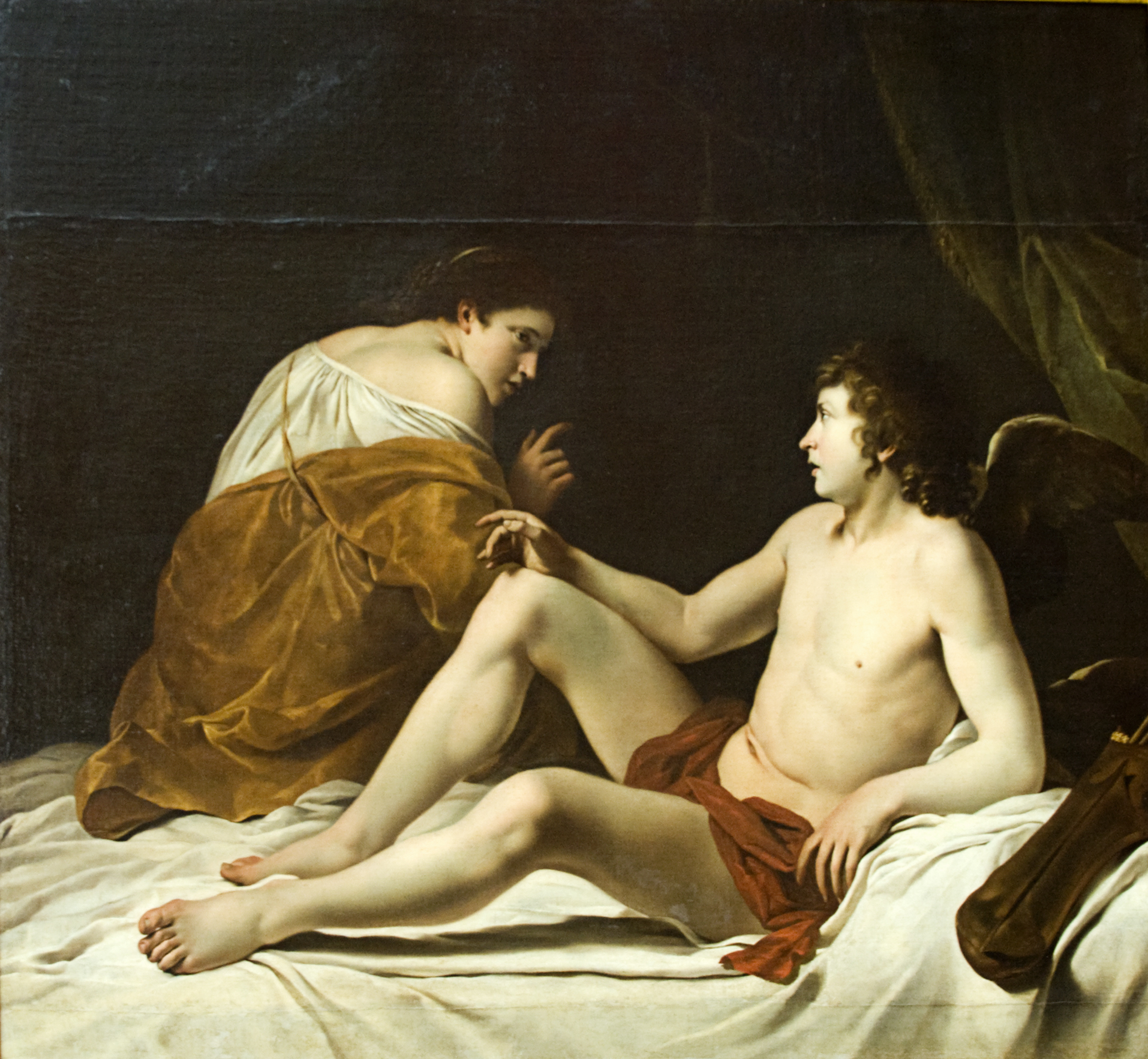
Orazio Gentileschi exposed the erotic vulnerability of the male figure in his Cupid and Psyche (1628–30)

Another peak of interest in Cupid and Psyche occurred in the Paris of the late 1790s and early 1800s, reflected in a proliferation of opera, ballet, Salon art, deluxe book editions, interior decoration such as clocks and wall paneling, and even hairstyles. In the aftermath of the French Revolution, the myth became a vehicle for the refashioning of the self. In English intellectual and artistic circles around the turn of the 18th and 19th centuries, the fashion for Cupid and Psyche accompanied a fascination for the ancient mystery religions. In writing about the Portland Vase, which was obtained by the British Museum around 1810, Erasmus Darwin speculated that the myth of Cupid and Psyche was part of the Eleusinian cycle. With his interest in natural philosophy, Darwin saw the butterfly as an apt emblem of the soul because it began as an earthbound caterpillar, "died" into the pupal stage, and was then resurrected as a beautiful winged creature.

=== Literature ===
In 1491, the poet Niccolò da Correggio retold the story with Cupid as the narrator. John Milton alludes to the story at the conclusion of Comus (1634), attributing not one but two children to the couple: Youth and Joy. Shackerley Marmion wrote a verse version called Cupid and Psyche (1637), and La Fontaine adapted the story into a mixed prose and verse romance named Les Amours de Psiché et de Cupidon (The Loves of Cupid and Psyche; 1669).

William Blake's mythology draws on elements of the tale particularly in the figures of Luvah and Vala. Luvah takes on the various guises of Apuleius's Cupid: beautiful and winged; disembodied voice; and serpent. Blake, who mentions his admiration for Apuleius in his notes, combines the myth with the spiritual quest expressed through the eroticism of the Song of Solomon, with Solomon and the Shulamite as a parallel couple.

Cupid and Psyche (1817) by Jacques-Louis David: the choice of narrative moment—a libertine adolescent Cupid departs Psyche's bed with "malign joy"—was a new twist on the well-worn subject

Mary Tighe published her poem Psyche in 1805. She added some details to the story, such as placing two springs in Venus' garden, one with sweet water and one with bitter. When Cupid starts to obey his mother's command, he brings some of both to a sleeping Psyche, but places only the bitter water on Psyche's lips. Tighe's Venus only asks one task of Psyche, to bring her the forbidden water, but in performing this task Psyche wanders into a country bordering on Spenser's Fairie Queene as Psyche is aided by a mysterious visored knight and his squire Constance, and must escape various traps set by Vanity, Flattery, Ambition, Credulity, Disfida (who lives in a "Gothic castle"), Varia and Geloso. Spenser's Blatant Beast also makes an appearance. Tighe's work influenced English lyric poetry on the theme, such as the Ode to Psyche (1820) by John Keats. Letitia Elizabeth Landon's poem Cupid and Psyche (1826) illustrates an engraving of a painting by W. E. West.

William Morris retold the Cupid and Psyche story in verse in The Earthly Paradise (1868–70), and a chapter in Walter Pater's Marius the Epicurean (1885) was a prose translation. About the same time, Robert Bridges wrote Eros and Psyche: A Narrative Poem in Twelve Measures (1885; 1894).

Sylvia Townsend Warner transferred the story to Victorian England in her novel The True Heart (1929), though few readers made the connection till she pointed it out herself. Other literary adaptations include The Robber Bridegroom (1942), a novella by Eudora Welty; Till We Have Faces (1956), a version by C. S. Lewis narrated by a sister of Psyche; and the poem "Psyche: 'Love drove her to Hell'" by H.D. (Hilda Doolittle). Robert A. Johnson made use of the story in his book She: Understanding Feminine Psychology, published in 1976 by HarperCollinsPublishers. The 2023 novel Psyche and Eros by Luna McNamara is based on the story.

==== Translations ====
William Adlington made the first translation into English of Apuleius's Metamorphoses in 1566, under the title The XI Bookes of the Golden Asse, Conteininge the Metamorphosie of Lucius Apuleius. Adlington seems not to have been interested in a Neoplatonic reading, but his translation consistently suppresses the sensuality of the original. Thomas Taylor published an influential translation of Cupid and Psyche in 1795, several years before his complete Metamorphoses. A translation by Robert Graves appeared in 1951 as The Transformations of Lucius Otherwise Known as THE GOLDEN ASS, A New Translation by Robert Graves from Apuleius, published by Farrar, Straus & Giroux, New York.

==== Folklore and children's literature ====
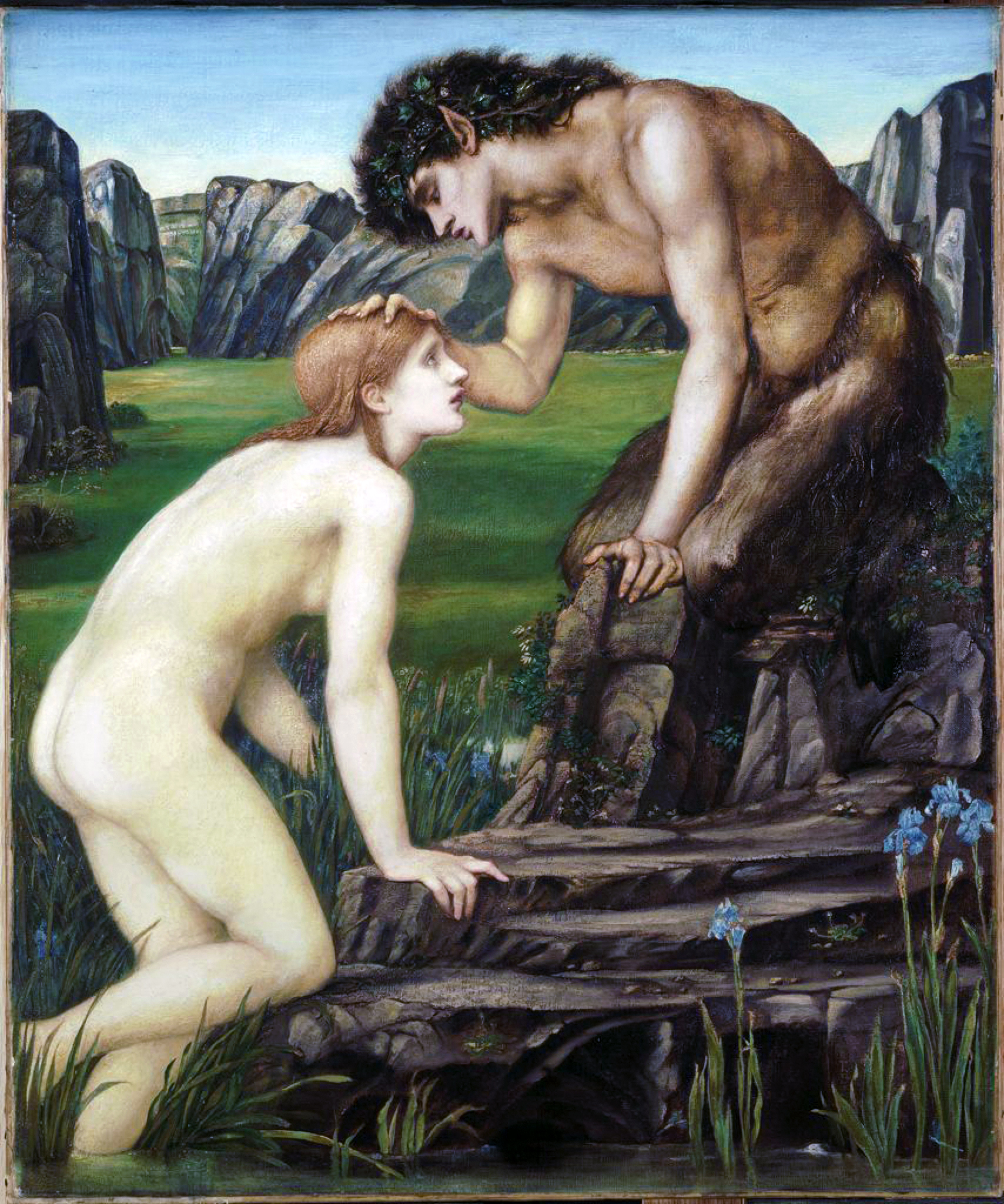
Pan and Psyche (1872–74) by Edward Burne-Jones

===== Origins =====
Folklore scholarship has also occupied itself with the possible origin of the narrative. Swedish folklorist Jan-Öjvind Swahn, who authored a long study on the story, German philologist Ludwig Friedländer and Russian folklorist Vladimir Propp defended the idea that it originated from a legitimate folklore source. Researchers also argue that the tale of Cupid and Psyche, as written by the Roman author Apuleius, has its roots in Berber North African oral tradition.

Some scholars tend to look for a single source: Stith Thompson suggested an Italian origin, while Lesky, Gédeon Huet and Georgios A. Megas indicated a Greek origin. French Émile Dermenghem favoured a North African source, followed by French researchers Nedjima and Emmanuel Plantade, who all argue that the tale is a reworking of Berber folklore, since Apuleius was born and lived in Madauros, Numidia, located in what is modern day Algeria.

Another line of scholars argue for some myth that underlines the Apuleian narrative. German classicist Richard August Reitzenstein supposed on an "Iranian sacral myth", brought to Greece via Egypt. Graham Anderson argues for a reworking of mythic material from Asia Minor (namely, Hittite: the Myth of Telipinu). In a study published posthumously, Romanian folklorist Petru Caraman also argued for a folkloric origin, but was of the notion that Apuleius superimposed Graeco-Roman mythology on a pre-Christian myth about a serpentine or draconic husband, or a "King of Snakes" that becomes human at night.

On the other extreme, German classicist Detlev Fehling took a hard and skeptical approach and considered the tale to be a literary invention of Apuleius himself.

===== Literary legacy =====
Friedländer also listed several European tales of marriage between a human maiden and prince cursed to be an animal, as related to the "Cupid and Psyche" cycle of stories (which later became known as "The Search for the Lost Husband" and "Animal as Bridegroom").

Bruno Bettelheim notes in The Uses of Enchantment that the 18th-century fairy tale Beauty and the Beast is a version of Cupid and Psyche. Motifs from Apuleius occur in several fairy tales, including Cinderella and Rumpelstiltskin, in versions collected by folklorists trained in the classical tradition, such as Charles Perrault and the Grimm brothers. In the Grimm version, Cinderella is given the task of sorting lentils and peas from ash, and is aided by birds just as ants help Psyche in the sorting of grain and legumes imposed on her by Venus. Like Cinderella, Psyche has two envious sisters who compete with her for the most desirable male. Cinderella's sisters mutilate their own feet to emulate her, while Psyche's are dashed to death on a rocky cliff. In Hans Christian Andersen's The Little Mermaid, the Little Mermaid is given a dagger by her sisters, who, in an attempt to end all the suffering she endured and to let her become a mermaid again, attempt to persuade her to use it to slay the Prince while he is asleep with his new bride. She cannot bring herself to kill the Prince, however. Unlike Psyche, who becomes immortal, she doesn't receive his love in return, but she, nevertheless, ultimately earns the eternal soul she yearns for.

Thomas Bulfinch wrote a shorter adaptation of the Cupid and Psyche tale for his Age of Fable, borrowing Tighe's invention of Cupid's self-wounding, which did not appear in the original. Josephine Preston Peabody wrote a version for children in her Old Greek Folk Stories Told Anew (1897).

C. S. Lewis' Till We Have Faces is a retelling of Apuleius' Cupid and Psyche from the perspective of one of Psyche's sisters. Till We Have Faces is C. S. Lewis' last work of fiction and elaborates on Apuleius' story in a modern way.

=== Performing arts ===
In 1634, Thomas Heywood turned the tale of Cupid and Psyche into a masque for the court of Charles I. Lully's Psyché (1678) is a Baroque French opera (a "tragédie lyrique") based on the 1671 play by Molière, which had musical intermèdes by Lully. Matthew Locke's semi-opera Psyche (1675) is a loose reworking from the 1671 production. In 1800, Ludwig Abeille premièred his four-act German opera (singspiel) Amor und Psyche, with a libretto by Franz Carl Hiemer based on Apuleius.

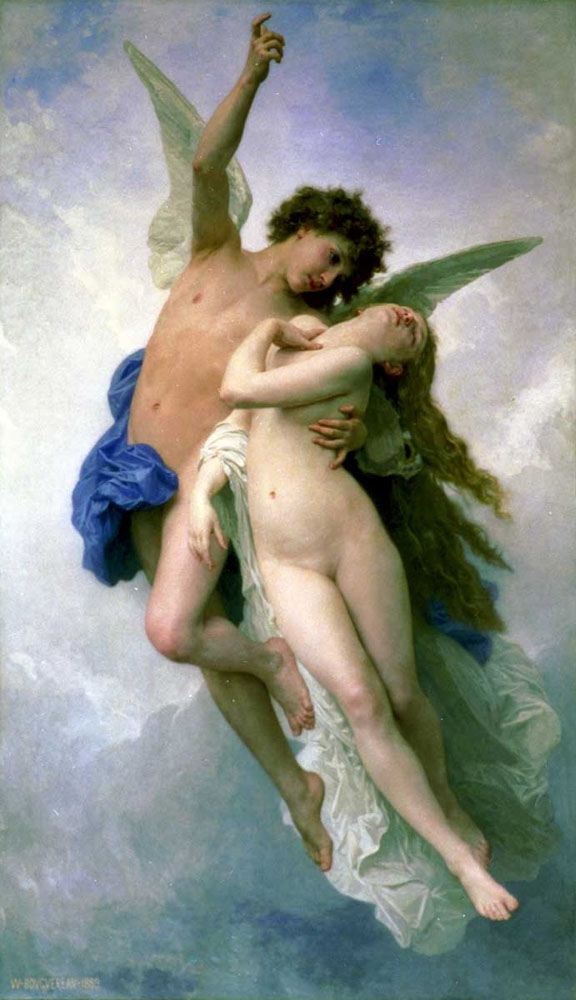
Psyché et l'Amour (1889) by Bouguereau

In the 19th century, Cupid and Psyche was a source for "transformations", visual interludes involving tableaux vivants, transparencies and stage machinery that were presented between the scenes of a pantomime but extraneous to the plot. During the 1890s, when tableaux vivants or "living pictures" were in vogue as a part of vaudeville, the 1889 Psyché et l'Amour of Bouguereau was among the artworks staged. To create these tableaux, costumed performers "froze" in poses before a background copied meticulously from the original and enlarged within a giant picture frame. Nudity was feigned by flesh-colored bodystockings that negotiated standards of realism, good taste, and morality. Claims of educational and artistic value allowed female nudes—a popular attraction—to evade censorship. Psyché et l'Amour was reproduced by the scenic painter Edouard von Kilanyi, who made a tour of Europe and the United States beginning in 1892, and by George Gordon in an Australian production that began its run in December 1894. The illusion of flight was so difficult to sustain that this tableau was necessarily brief. The performer billed as "The Modern Milo" during this period specialized in recreating female sculptures, a Psyche in addition to her namesake Venus de Milo.

Frederick Ashton choreographed a ballet Cupid and Psyche with music by Lord Berners and decor by Sir Francis Rose, first performed on 27 April 1939 by the Sadler's Wells Ballet (now Royal Ballet). Frank Staff danced as Cupid, Julia Farron as Psyche, Michael Somes as Pan, and June Brae as Venus.

==== Modern adaptations ====
An American vaudeville performance from 1897 as Cupid and Psyche

Cupid and Psyche continues to be a source of inspiration for modern playwrights and composers. Notable adaptations include:

- Psyche (symphonic poem) by César Franck (1888)
- Till We Have Faces: A Myth Retold by C. S. Lewis
- "Psyché:poème dramatique en trois actes," (play) by Gabriel Mourey, Paris, Mercure de France, 1913. "Syrinx" was composed by Claude Debussy as incidental music for the play.
- Eros and Psyche (opera) with libretto by Jerzy Żuławski, composed by Ludomir Różycki (Wroclaw, Poland, 1917)
- Psyche: An Opera in Three Acts (opera) based on the novel Psyche by Louis Couperus, composed by Meta Overman (1955)
- Metamorphoses (play) by Mary Zimmerman, adapted from the classic Ovid poem Metamorphoses, including the myth of Eros and Psyche (Northwestern University, 1996; Circle in the Square Theatre, Broadway, NYC 2002)
- The Golden Ass (play) by Peter Oswald, adapted from Apuleius, commissioned for Shakespeare's Globe (London, England 2002)
- Cupid and Psyche (musical) by with book and lyrics by Sean Hartley and music by Jihwan Kim (New York City, NY 2003).
- Cupid and Psyche (verse drama) by Joseph Fisher (Stark Raving Theatre, Portland, OR 2002; Staged Reading: Oregon Shakespeare Festival, 2002)
- Amor & Psyche (pastiche opera) arranged by Alan Dornak (Opera Feroce, part of Vertical Player Repertory, New York City, 2010)
- Cupid and Psyche: An Internet Love Story (play) by Maria Hernandez, Emma Rosecan and Alexis Stickovitch (YouthPLAYS, 2012)
- Psyche: A Modern Rock Opera (rock opera) by Cindy Shapiro (Greenway Court Theater, Los Angeles, CA, 2014)
- Cupid and Psyche (verse drama) by Emily C. A. Snyder (Turn to Flesh Productions [TTF], New York City, NY, 2014). As part of the Love and Death Trilogy (Staged Reading, TTF, New York City, NY 2018)
- Amor and Psyche (In Times of Plagues) (Short film) by VestAndPage (2020)
- "Amore e Psiche" (opera) by Fabio Mengozzi (2023)

=== Psychology ===
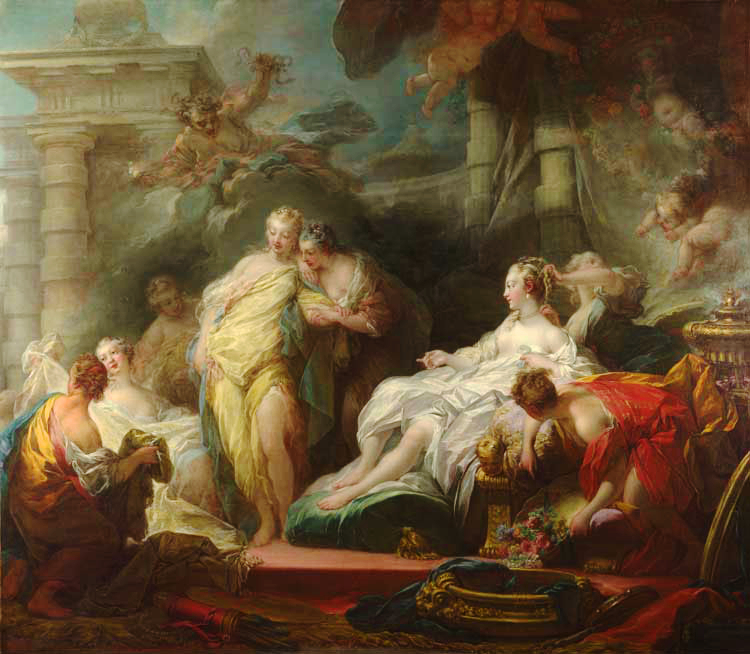
Psyche showing her Sisters her Gifts from Cupid, Painting by Jean-Honoré Fragonard

Viewed in terms of psychology rather than allegory, the tale of Cupid and Psyche shows how "a mutable person … matures within the social constructs of family and marriage". In the Jungian allegory of Erich Neumann (1956), the story of Psyche was interpreted as "the psychic development of the feminine".

Cupid and Psyche has been analyzed from a feminist perspective as a paradigm of how the gender unity of women is disintegrated through rivalry and envy, replacing the bonds of sisterhood with an ideal of heterosexual love. This theme was explored in Psyche's Sisters: Reimagining the Meaning of Sisterhood (1988) by Christine Downing, who uses myth as a medium for psychology.

James Hillman made the story the basis for his critique of scientific psychology, The Myth of Analysis: Three Essays in Archetypal Psychology (1983). Carol Gilligan uses the story as the basis for much of her analysis of love and relationships in The Birth of Pleasure (Knopf, 2002).

=== Fine and decorative arts ===
The story of Cupid and Psyche is depicted in a wide range of visual media. Psyche is often represented with butterfly wings, and the butterfly is her frequent attribute and a symbol of the soul, though the literary Cupid and Psyche never says that she has or acquires wings. In antiquity, an iconographical tradition existed independently of Apuleius's tale and influenced later depictions.

==== Ancient art ====
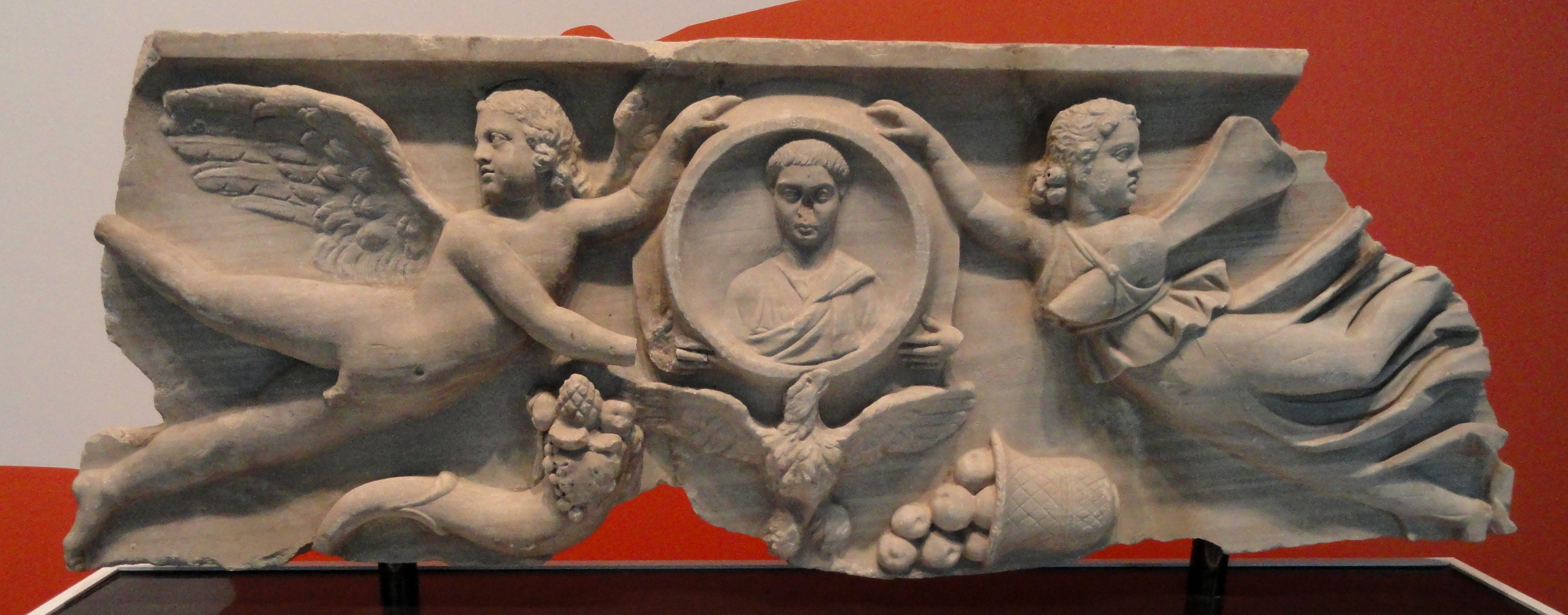
On this fragment from a sarcophagus used in the early 4th century, Cupid and a butterfly-winged Psyche frame a portrait of the deceased, carried on an eagle with a cornucopia and spilling basket of fruit (Indianapolis Museum of Art)

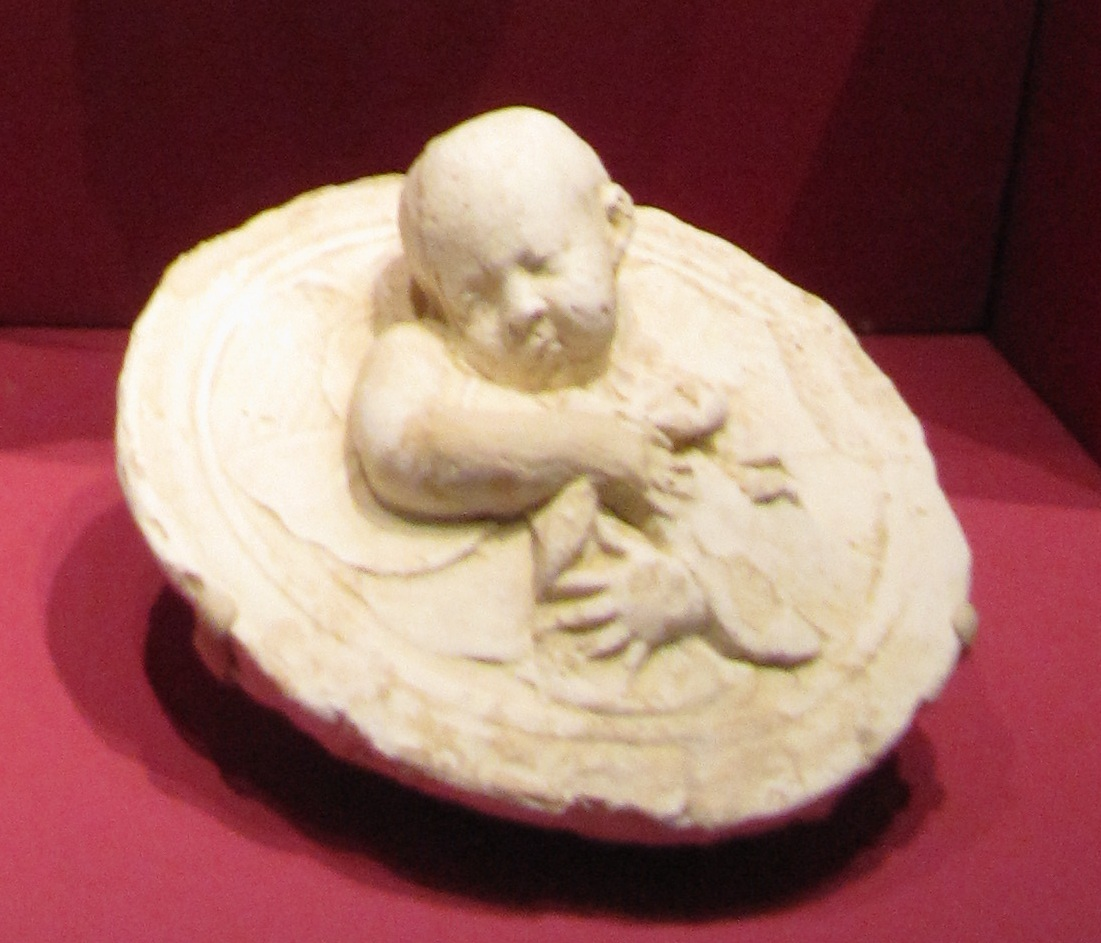
Eros and Psyche plaster medallion (1st century A.D.) excavated in Begram, collections of National Museum of Afghanistan; on exhibit at British Museum, London.

Some extant examples suggest that in antiquity Cupid and Psyche could have a religious or mystical meaning. Rings bearing their likeness, several of which come from Roman Britain, may have served an amuletic purpose. Engraved gems from Britain represent spiritual torment with the image of Cupid torching a butterfly. The two are also depicted in high relief in mass-produced Roman domestic plaster wares from the 1st to 2nd centuries AD found in excavations at Greco-Bactrian merchant settlements on the ancient Silk Road at Begram in Afghanistan (see gallery below). The allegorical pairing depicts perfection of human love in integrated embrace of body and soul ('psyche' Greek for butterfly symbol for transcendent immortal life after death). On sarcophagi, the couple often seem to represent an allegory of love overcoming death.

A relief of Cupid and Psyche was displayed at the mithraeum of Capua, but it is unclear whether it expresses a Mithraic quest for salvation, or was simply a subject that appealed to an individual for other reasons. Psyche is invoked with "Providence" (Pronoia) at the beginning of the so-called Mithras Liturgy.

In late antiquity, the couple are often shown in a "chin-chuck" embrace, a gesture of "erotic communion" with a long history. The rediscovery of freestanding sculptures of the couple influenced several significant works of the modern era.

Other depictions surviving from antiquity include a 2nd-century papyrus illustration possibly of the tale, and a ceiling fresco at Trier executed during the reign of Constantine I.

==== Modern era ====
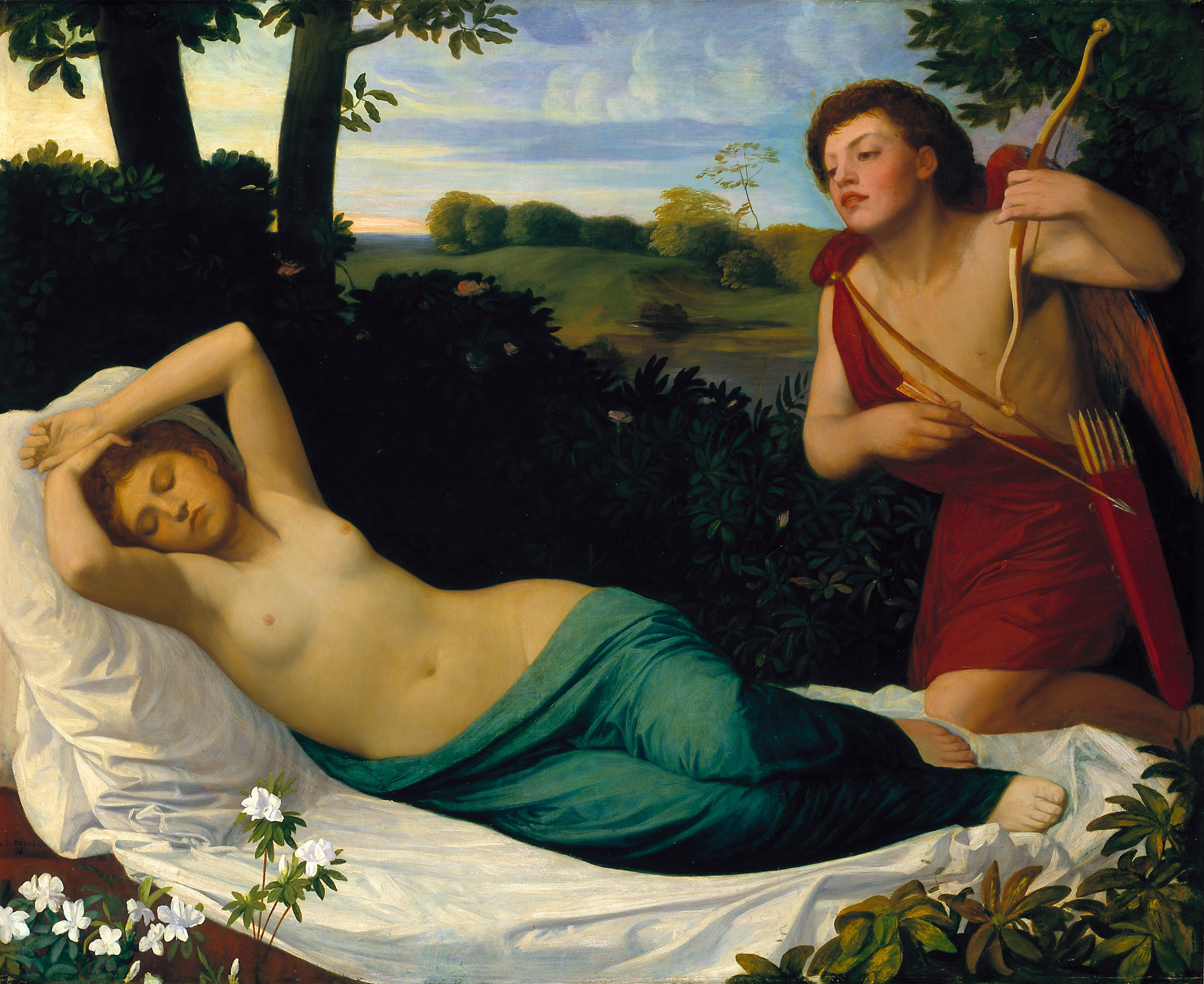
Cupid and Psyche (1867) by Alphonse Legros, criticized for rendering female nudity as "commonplace"

Works of art proliferated after the rediscovery of Apuleius's text, in conjunction with the influence of classical sculpture. In the mid-15th century, Cupid and Psyche became a popular subject for Italian wedding chests (cassoni), particularly those of the Medici. The choice was most likely prompted by Boccaccio's Christianized allegory. The earliest of these cassoni, dated variously to the years 1444–1470, pictures the narrative in two parts: from Psyche's conception to her abandonment by Cupid; and her wanderings and the happy ending. With the wedding of Peleus and Thetis, the subject was the most common choice for specifying paintings of the Feast of the Gods, which were popular from the Renaissance to Northern Mannerism.

Cupid and Psyche is a rich source for scenarios, and several artists have produced cycles of works based on it, including the frescoes at the Villa Farnesina (ca. 1518) by Raphael and his workshop; frescoes at Palazzo del Tè (1527–28) by Giulio Romano; engravings by the "Master of the Die" (mid-16th century); and paintings by the Pre-Raphaelite Edward Burne-Jones (in the 1870s–90s). Burne-Jones also executed a series of 47 drawings intended as illustrations for Morris's poem. Cupid and Psyche was the subject of the only cycle of prints created by the German Symbolist Max Klinger (1857–1920) to illustrate a specific story.

The special interest in the wedding as a subject in Northern Mannerism seems to spring from a large engraving of 1587 by Hendrik Goltzius in Haarlem of a drawing by Bartholomeus Spranger (now Rijksmuseum) that Karel van Mander had brought back from Prague, where Spranger was court painter to Rudolf II. The Feast of the Gods at the Marriage of Cupid and Psyche was so large, at 16 7/8 x 33 5/8 in. (43 x 85.4 cm), that it was printed from three different plates. Over 80 figures are shown, placed up in the clouds over a world landscape that can be glimpsed below. The composition borrows from both Raphael and Giulio Romano's versions.

The most popular subjects for single paintings or sculpture are the couple alone, or explorations of the figure of Psyche, who is sometimes depicted in compositions that recall the sleeping Ariadne as she was found by Dionysus. The use of nudity or sexuality in portraying Cupid and Psyche sometimes has offended contemporary sensibilities. In the 1840s, the National Academy of Art banned William Page's Cupid and Psyche, called perhaps "the most erotic painting in nineteenth-century America". Classical subject matter might be presented in terms of realistic nudity: in 1867, the female figure in the Cupid and Psyche of Alphonse Legros was criticized as a "commonplace naked young woman". But during the same period, Cupid and Psyche were also portrayed chastely, as in the pastoral sculptures Psyche (1845) by Townsend and Cupid and Psyche (1846) by Thomas Uwins, which were purchased by Queen Victoria and her consort Albert, otherwise keen collectors of nudes in the 1840s and 50s.

Portrayals of Psyche alone are often not confined to illustrating a scene from Apuleius, but may draw on the broader Platonic tradition in which Love was a force that shaped the self. The Psyche Abandoned of Jacques-Louis David, probably based on La Fontaine's version of the tale, depicts the moment when Psyche, having violated the taboo of looking upon her lover, is abandoned alone on a rock, her nakedness expressing dispossession and the color palette a psychological "divestment". The work has been seen as an "emotional proxy" for the artist's own isolation and desperation during his imprisonment, which resulted from his participation in the French Revolution and association with Robespierre.

==== Sculpture ====
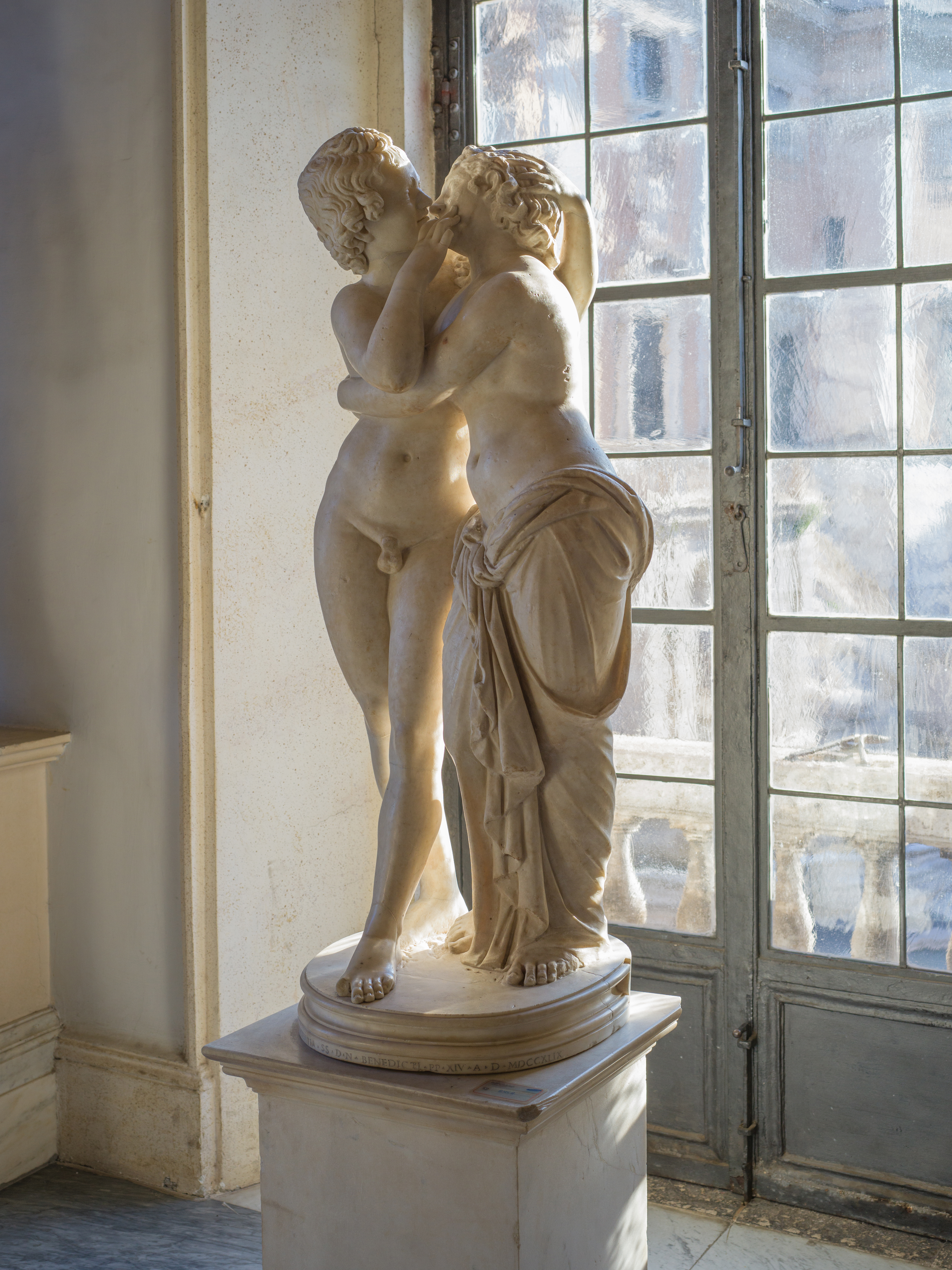
Cupid and Psyche (from an original of 2nd century BC), Capitoline Museums

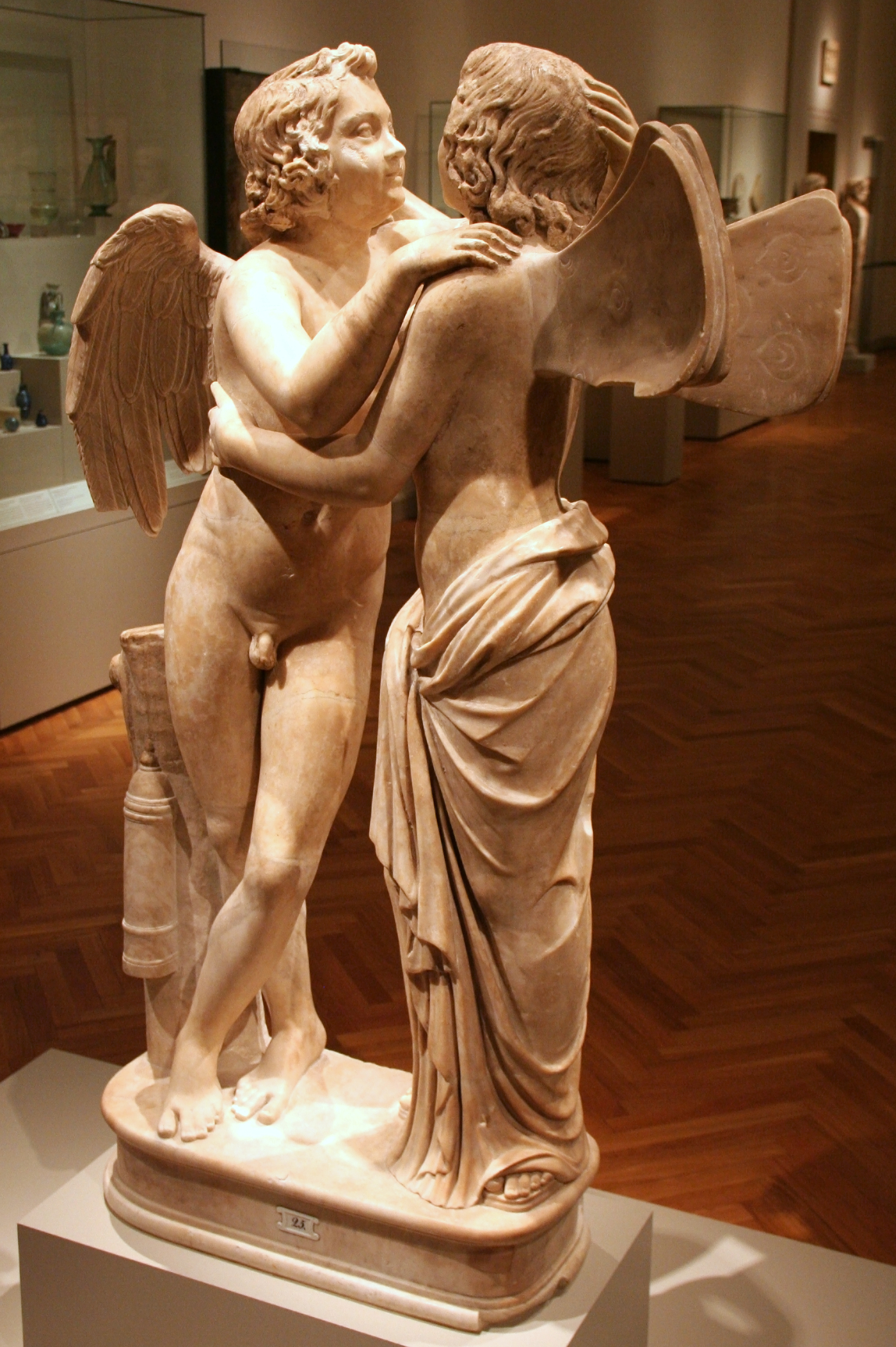
Cupid and Psyche (c. 150 AD), Altes Museum

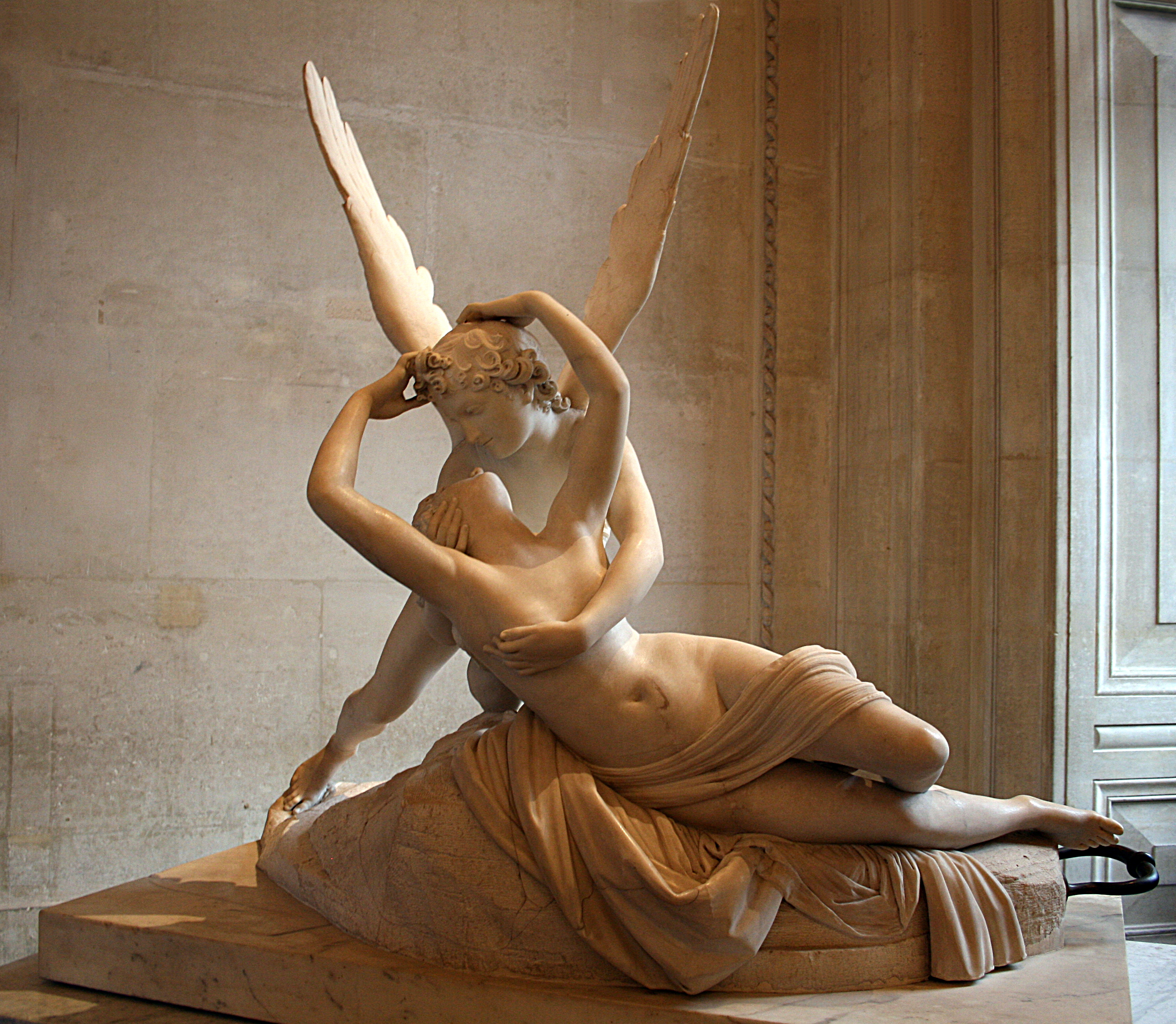
Psyche Revived by Cupid's Kiss (1793) by Antonio Canova, Louvre

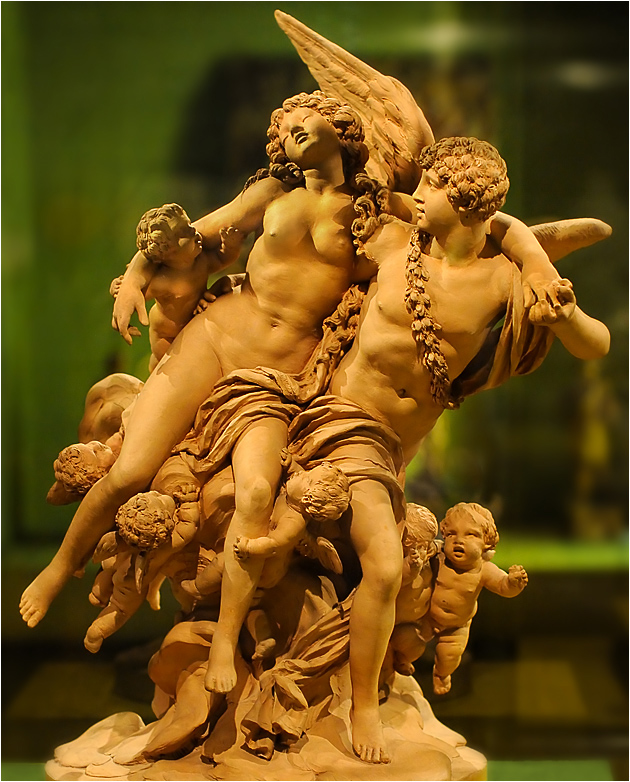
Cupid and Psyche by Clodion (d. 1814), Victoria and Albert Museum

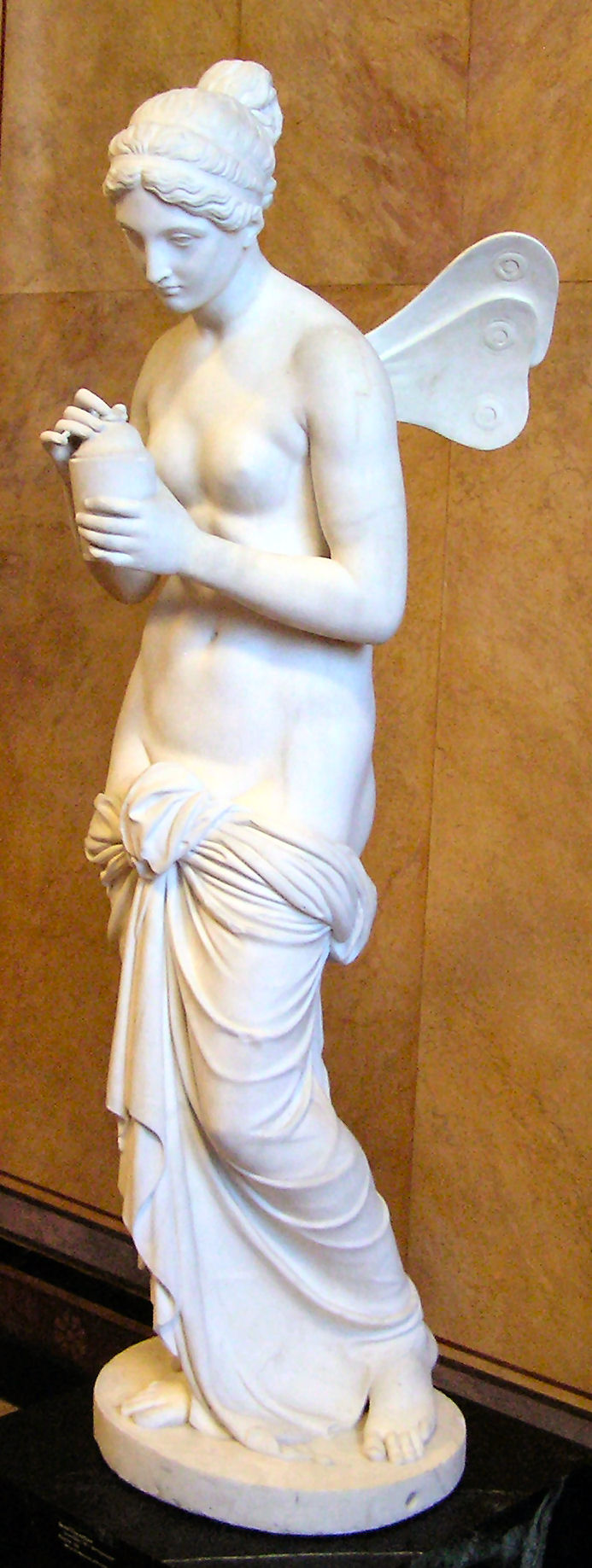
Psyche by Bertel Thorvaldsen (d. 1844), Alte Nationalgalerie

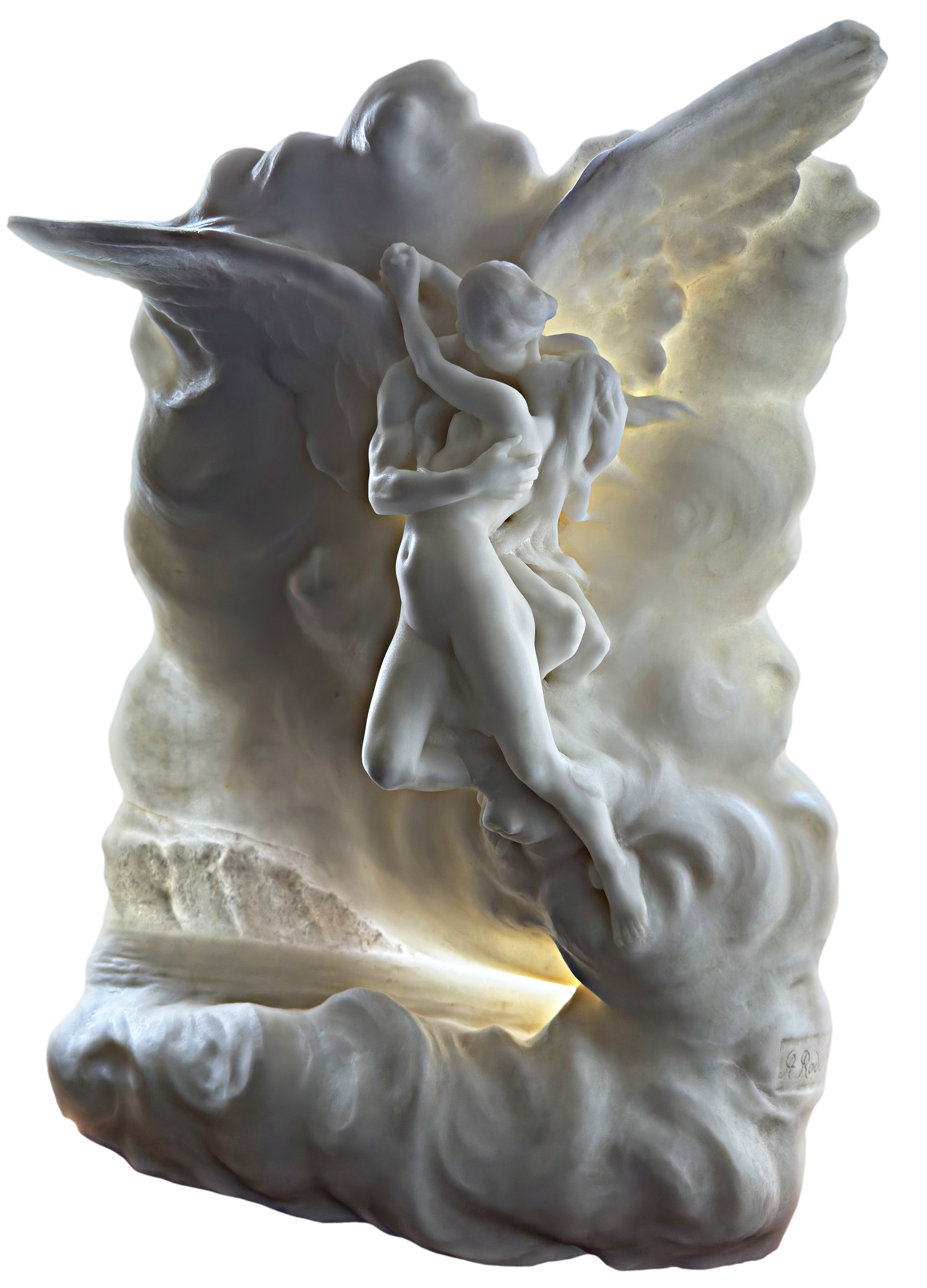
Cupid and Psyche 'Kiss' (1885) by Auguste Rodin, private collection

==== Paintings ====
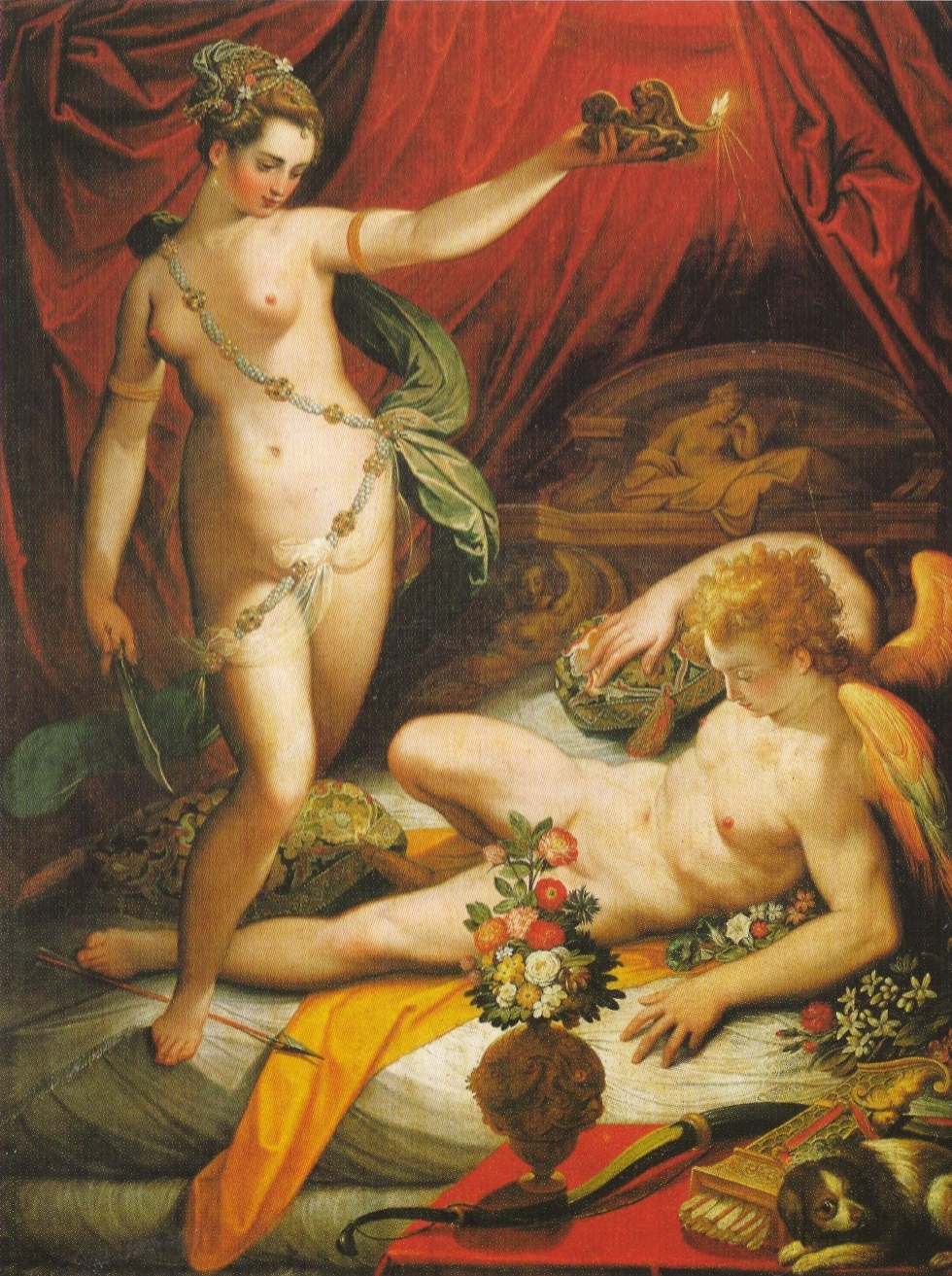
Amor and Psyche (1589) by Jacopo Zucchi. Galleria Borghese.

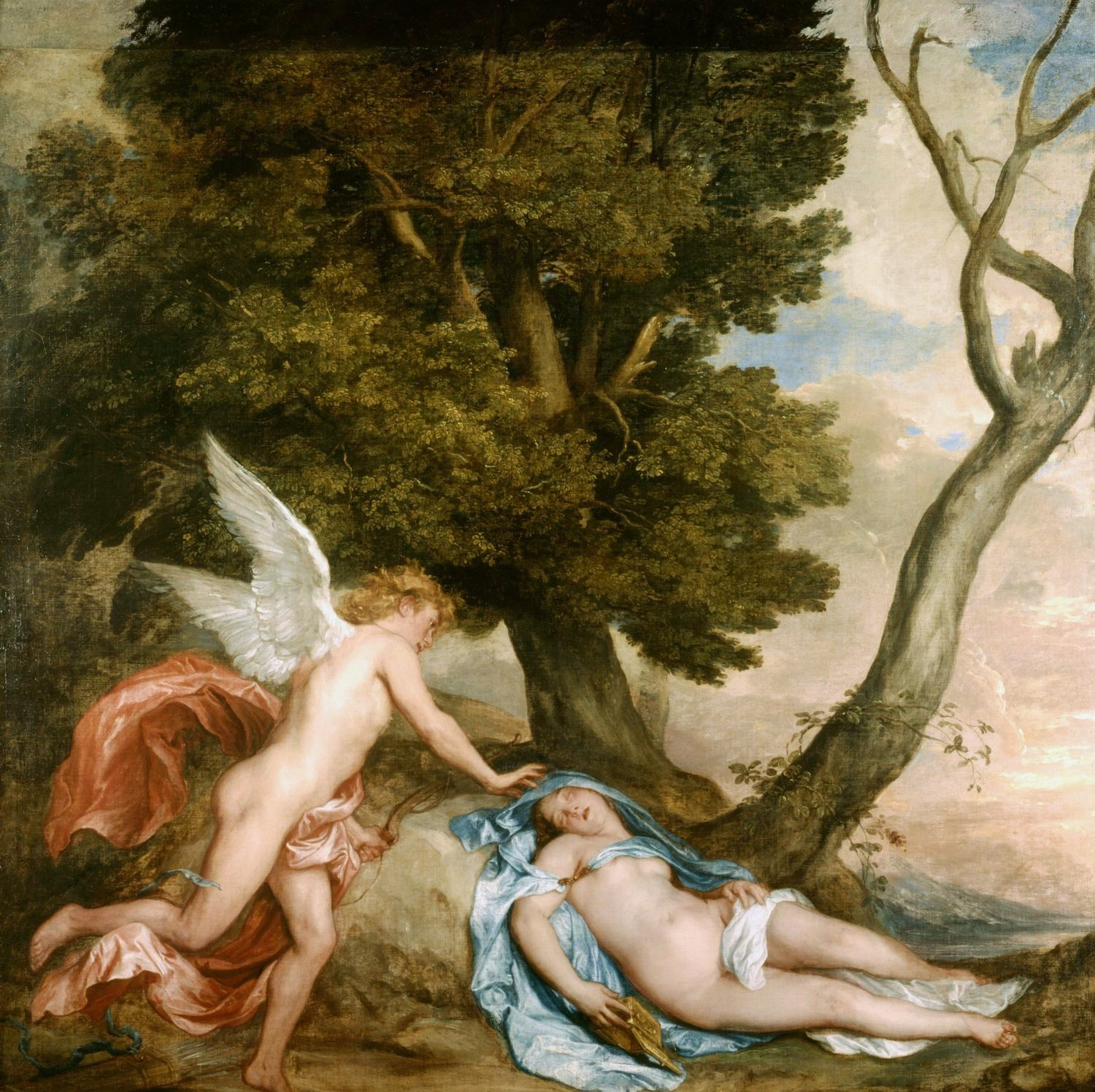
Cupid and Psyche (1639–40) by Anthony van Dyck: Cupid finds the sleeping Psyche; Kensington Palace.

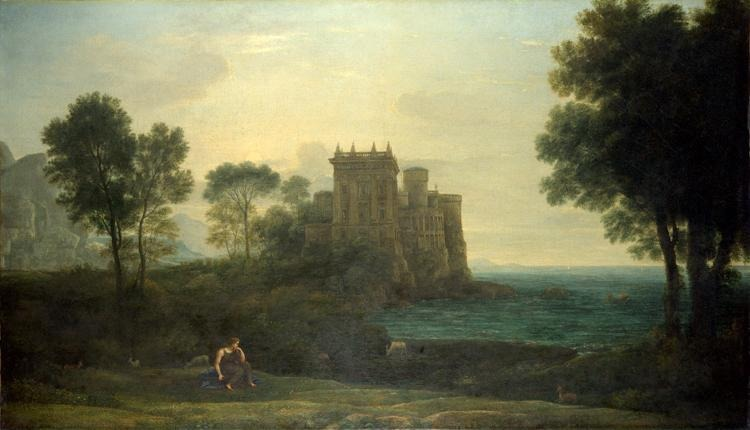
Landscape with Psyche Outside the Palace of Cupid (The Enchanted Castle) (1664) by Claude Lorrain. National Gallery.

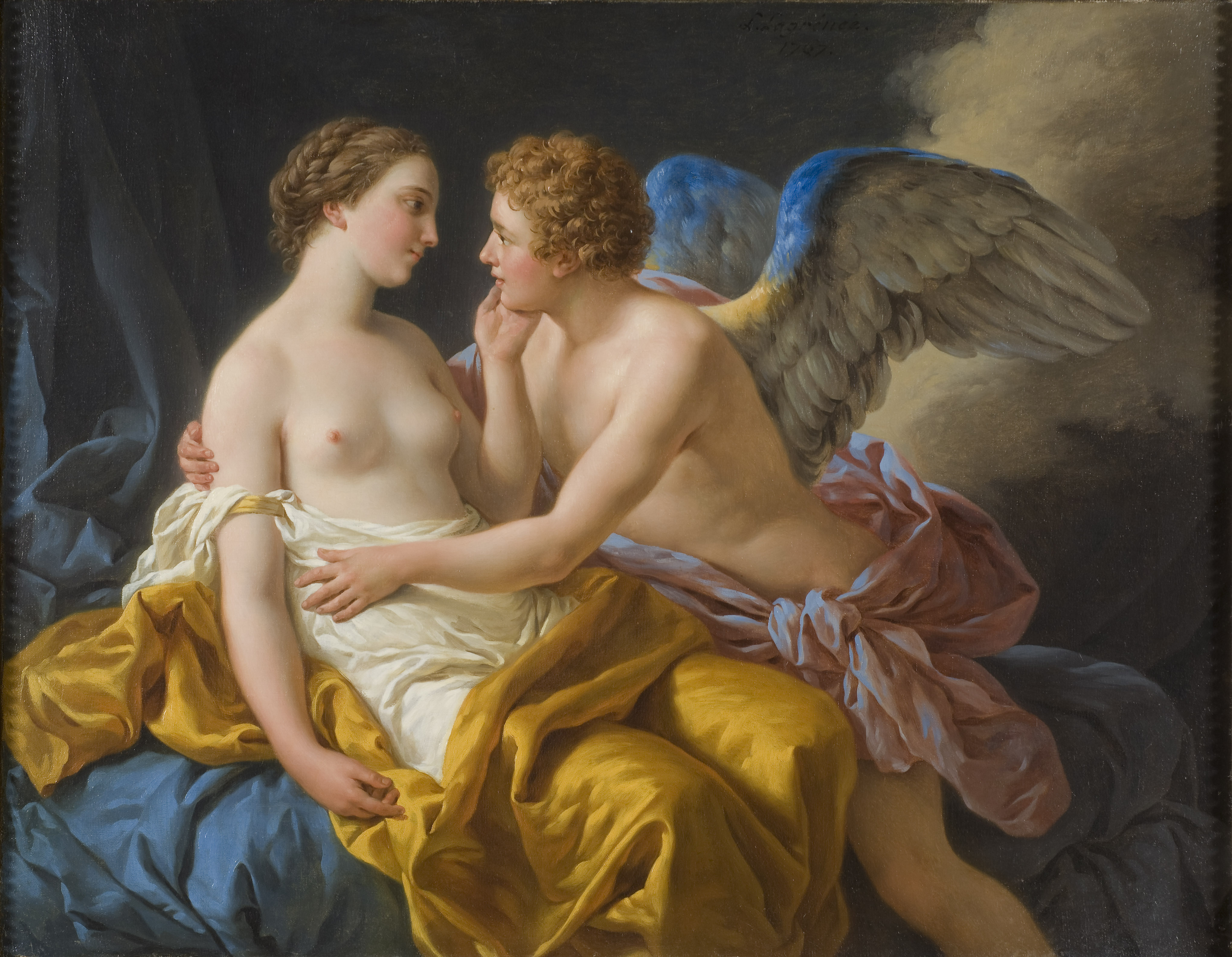
Amor and Psyche (1767) by Louis-Jean-François Lagrenée. Nationalmuseum.

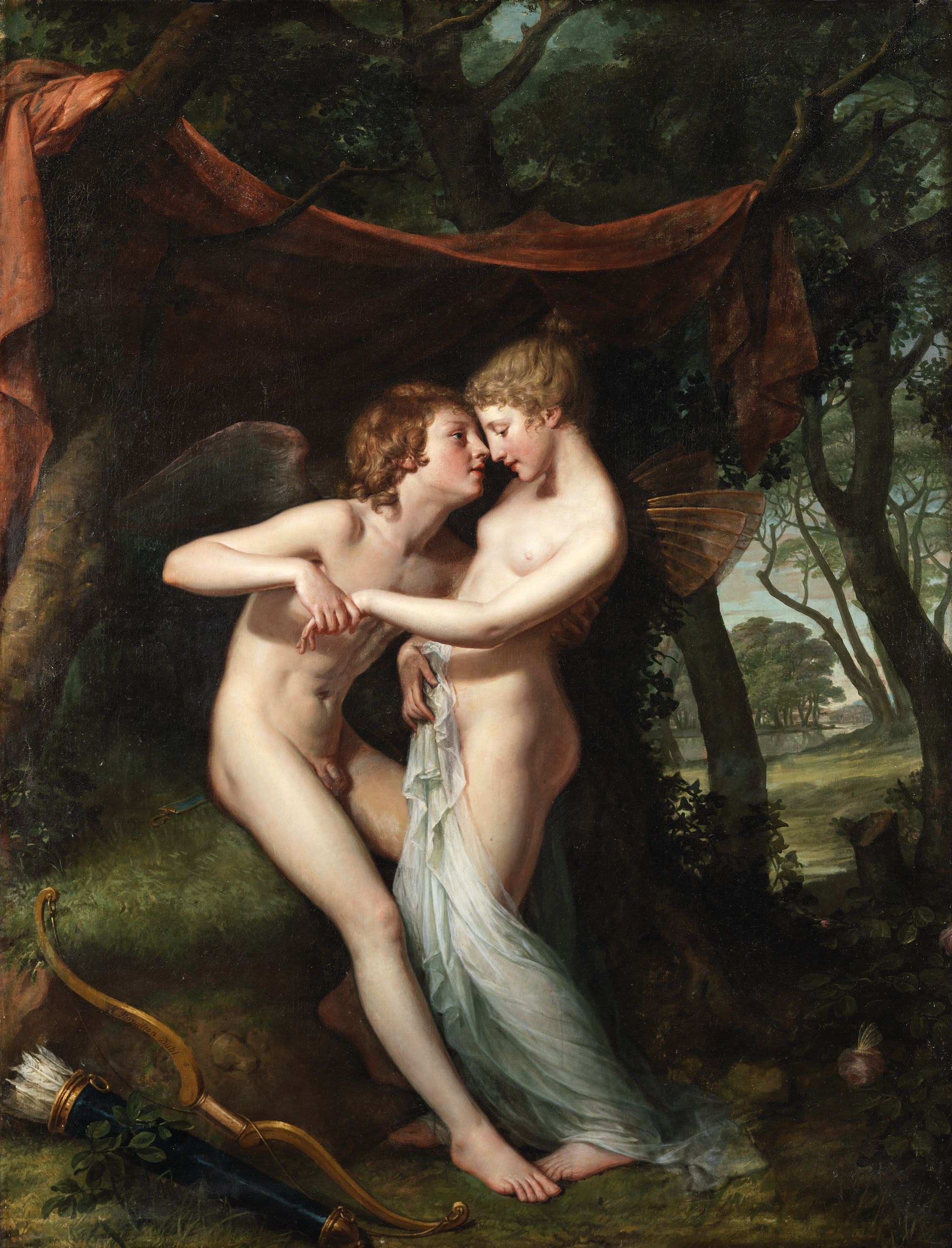
Cupid and Psyche in the nuptial bower (1792–93) by Hugh Douglas Hamilton. National Gallery of Ireland.

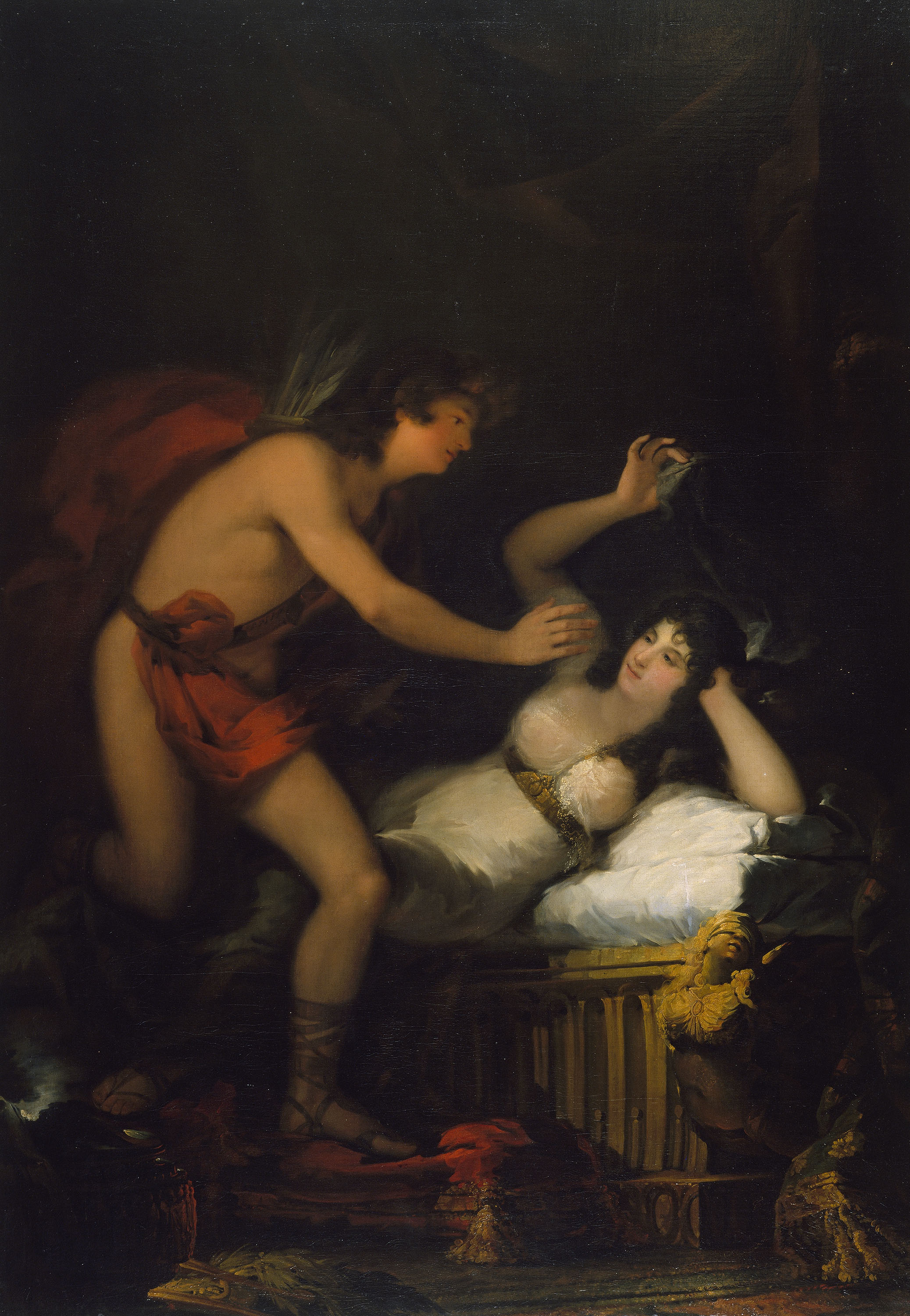
Allegory of Love, Cupid and Psyche (between 1798 and 1805) by Goya. Museu Nacional d'Art de Catalunya.

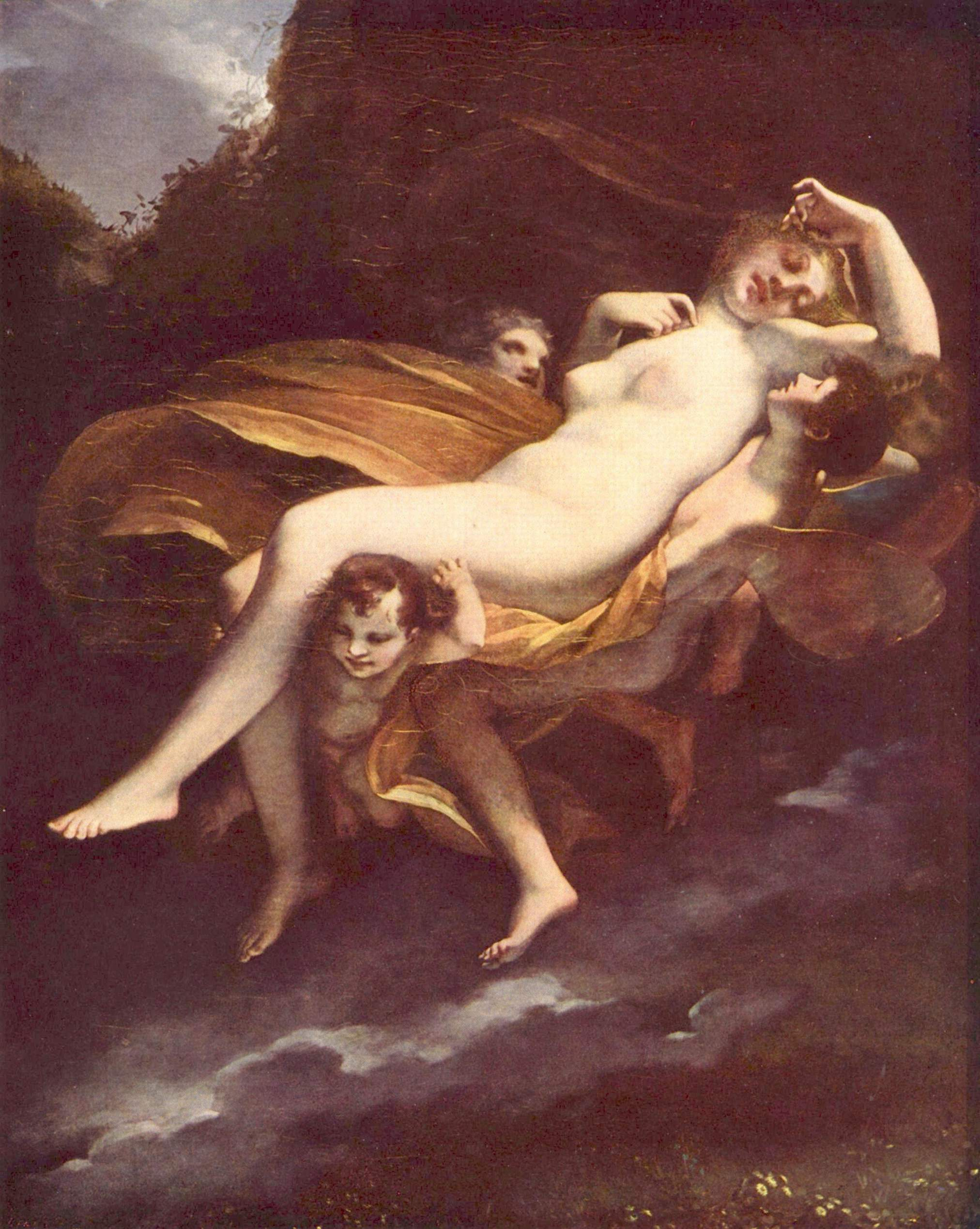
Psyche Lifted Up by Zephyrs (Romantic, c. 1800) by Pierre-Paul Prud'hon. Louvre.

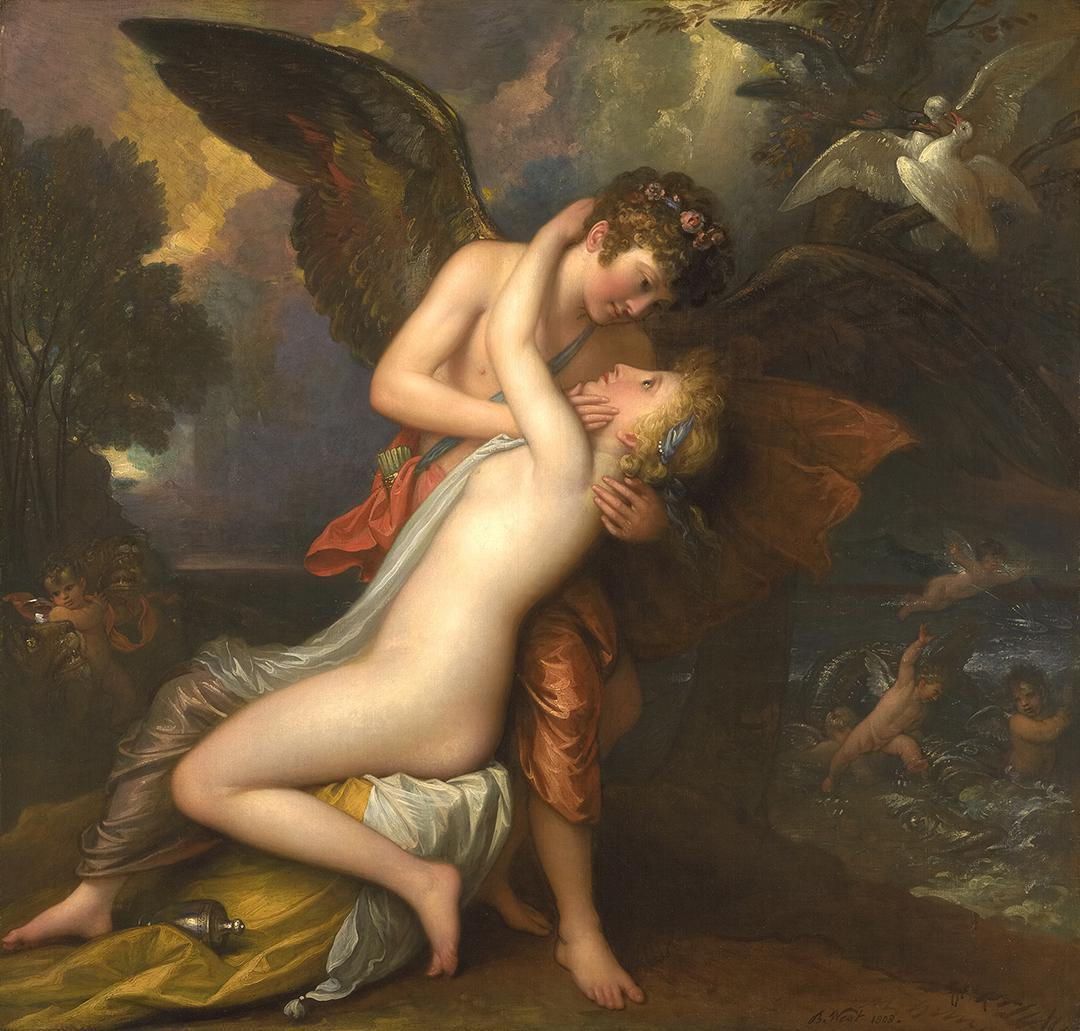
Cupid and Psyche (1808) by Benjamin West. PRA. Crystal Bridges Museum of American Art.

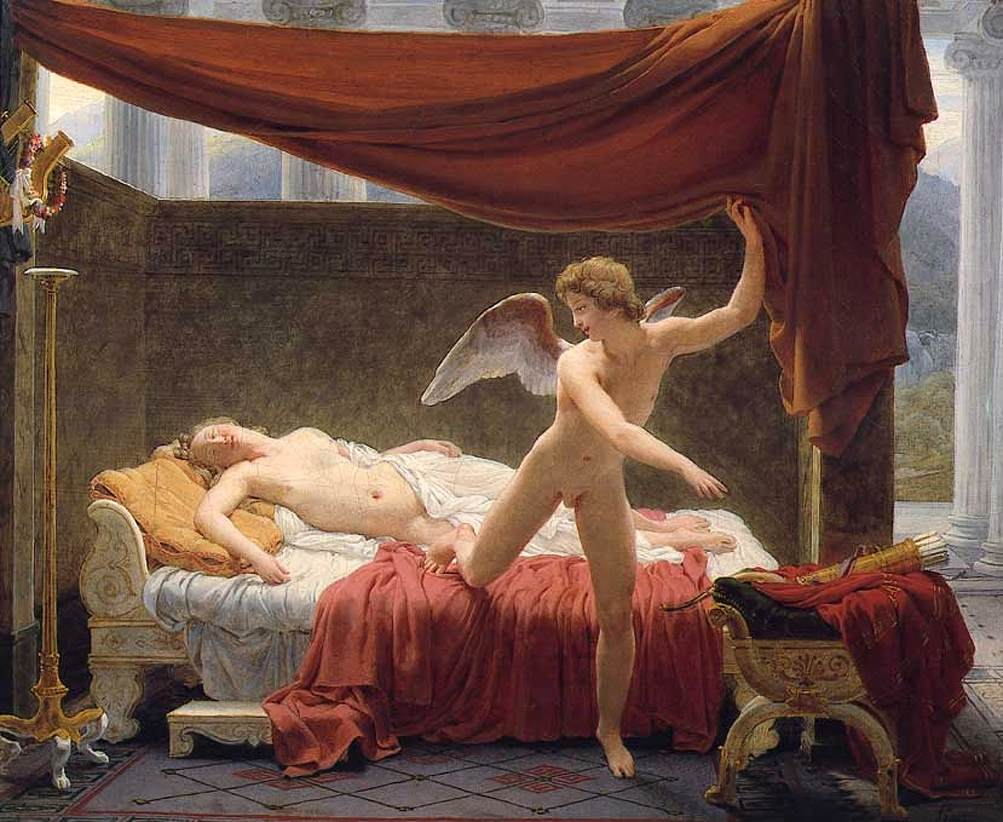
Psyche Abandoned (c. 1817) by François-Édouard Picot. Louvre.

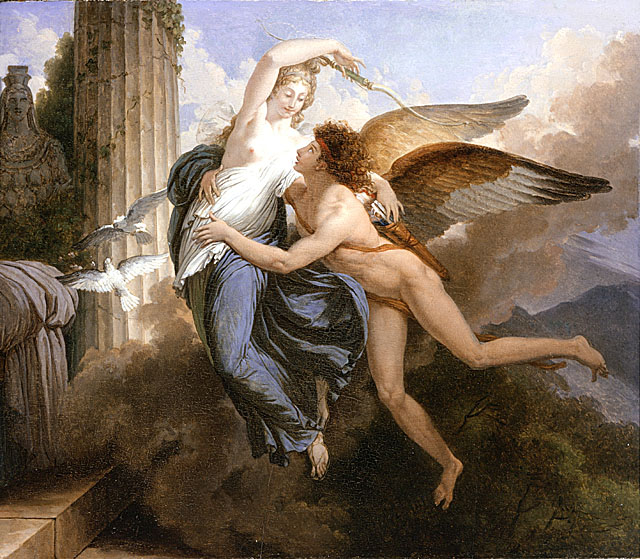
Cupid and Psyche (1843) by Jean-Pierre Saint-Ours. Los Angeles County Museum of Art.

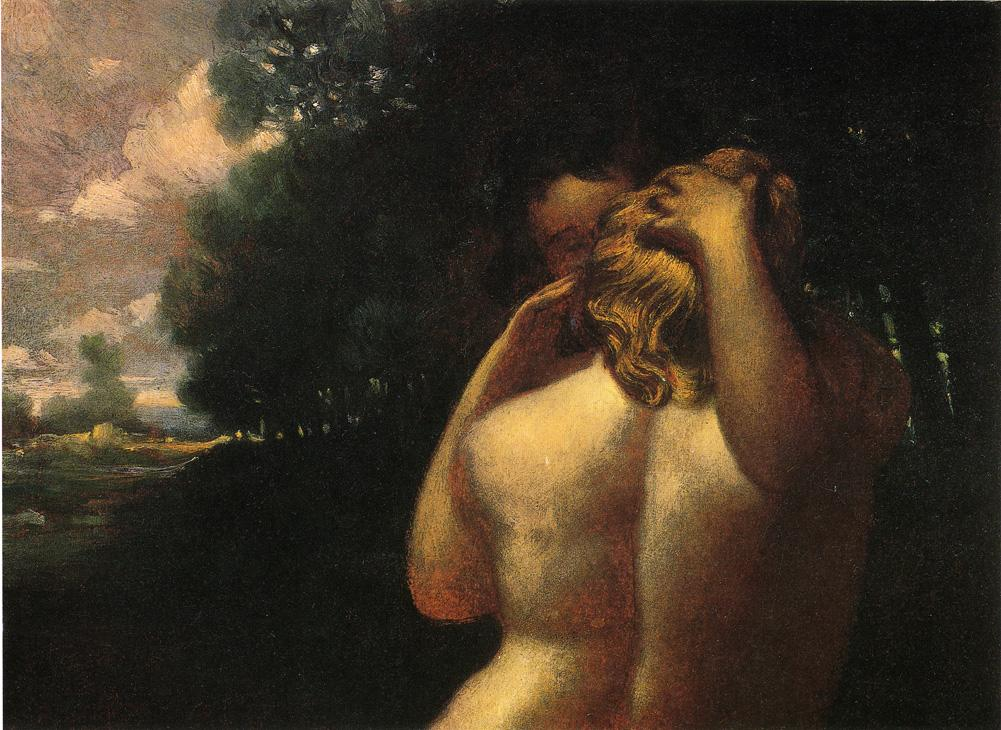
Cupid and Psyche (1843) by William Page. Fine Arts Museums of San Francisco

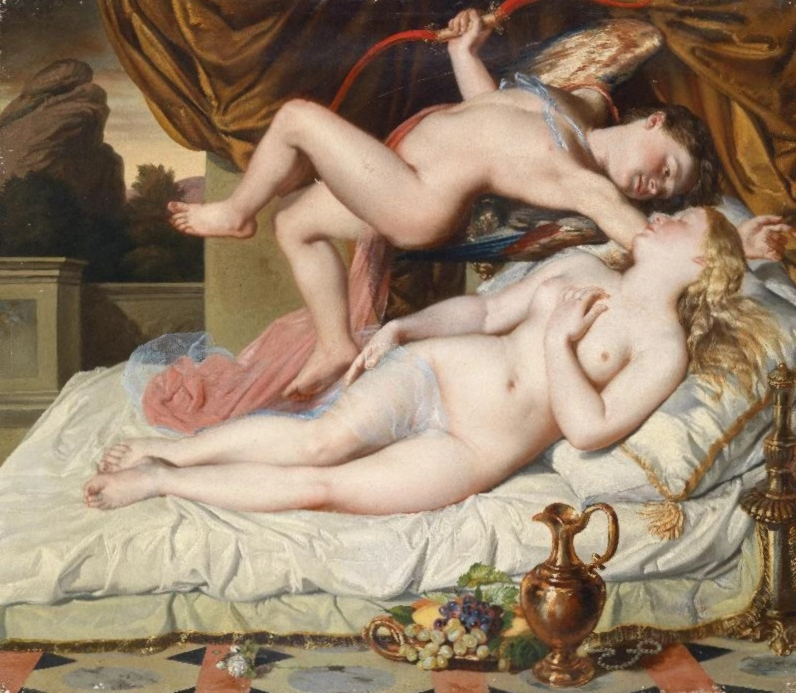
Cupid and Psyche (1850–55) by Károly Brocky. Hungarian National Gallery.

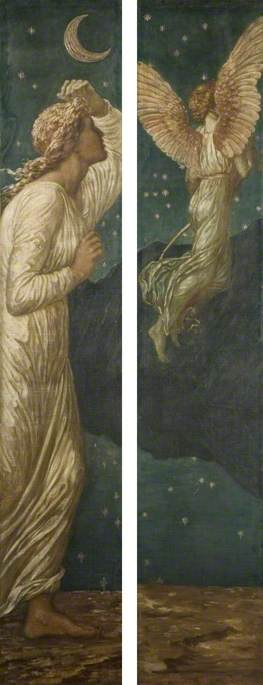
Cupid Flying Away from Psyche (between 1872 and 1881) by Edward Burne-Jones. Birmingham Museum and Art Gallery.

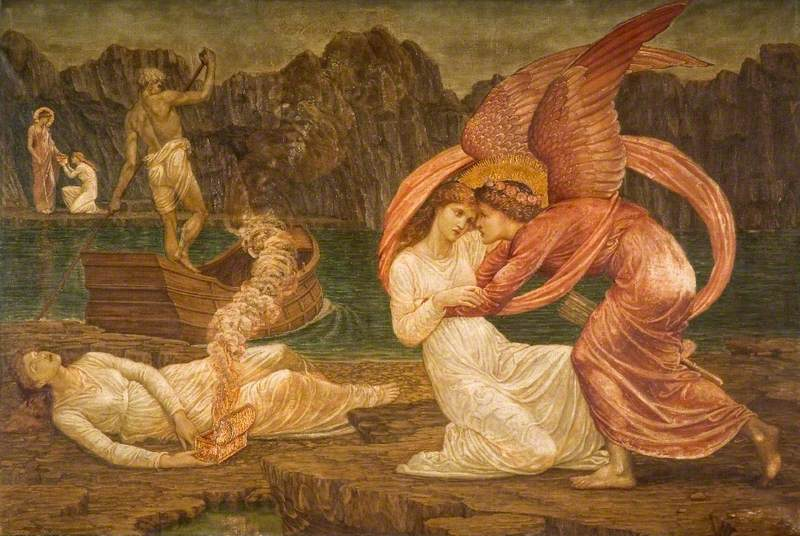
Psyche Receiving the Casket Back (between 1872 and 1881) by Edward Burne-Jones. Birmingham Museum and Art Gallery.

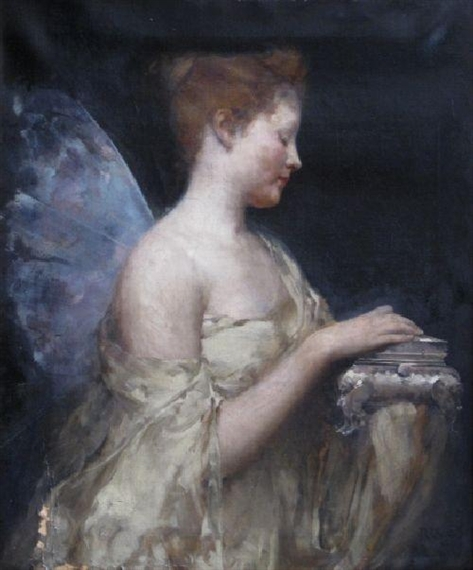
Psyche (1890) by John Reinhard Weguelin; private collection.

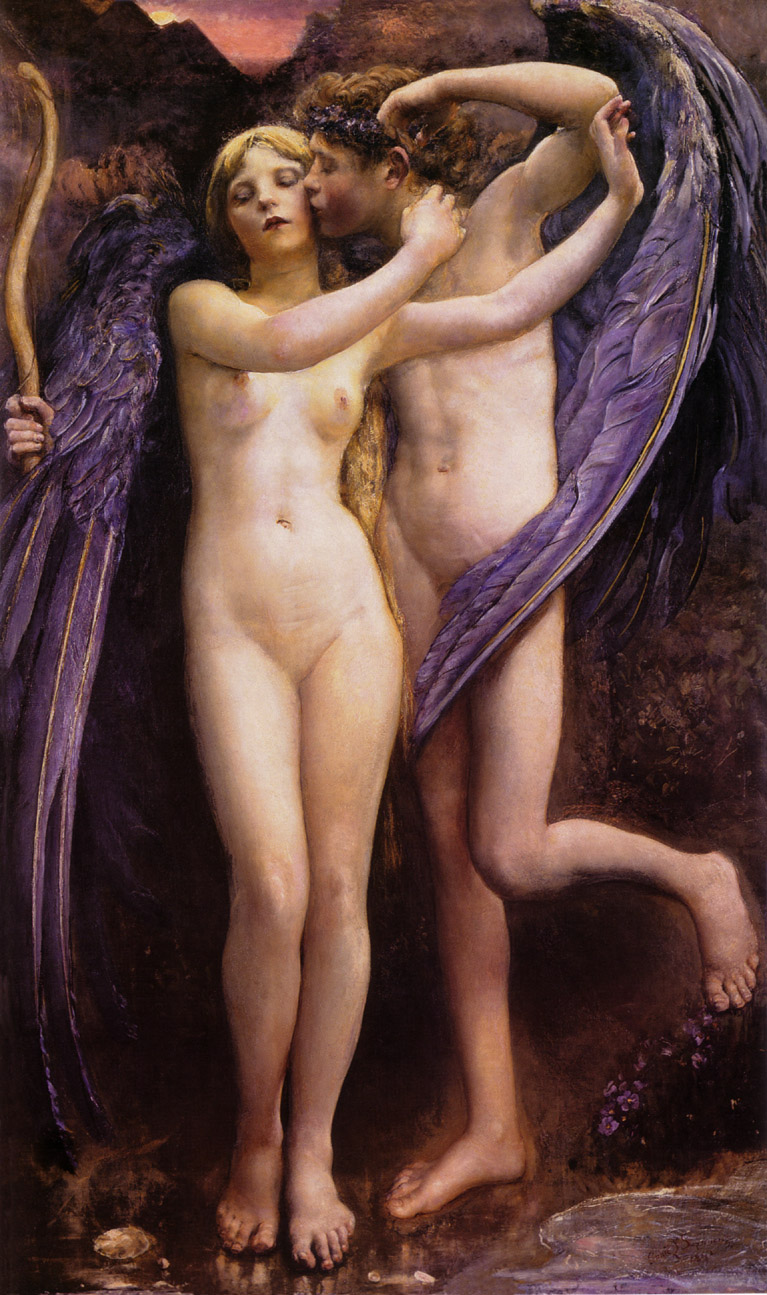
Cupid and Psyche (1891) by Annie Swynnerton. Gallery Oldham.

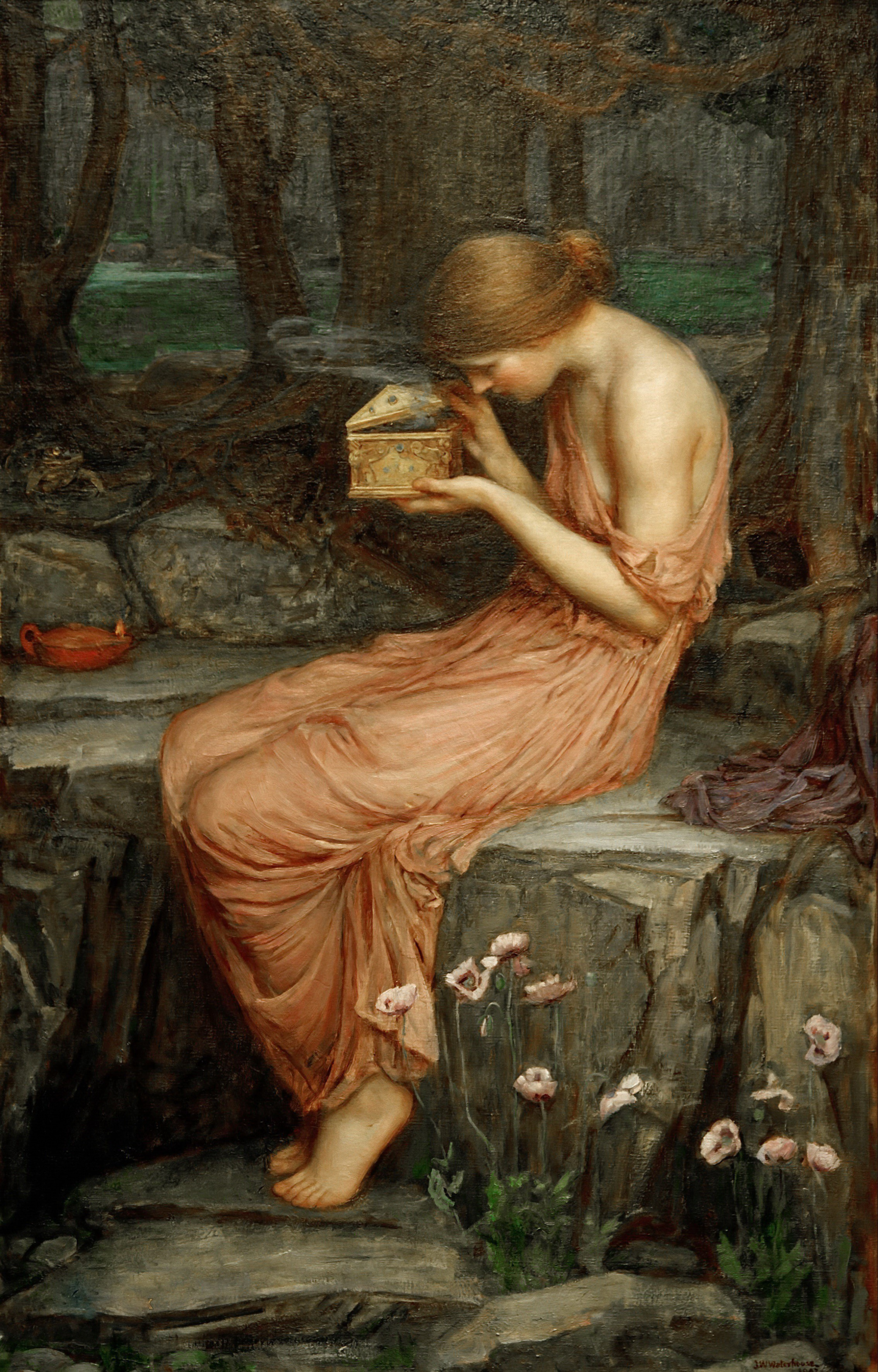
Psyche Opening the Golden Box (1903) by John William Waterhouse. Private collection.

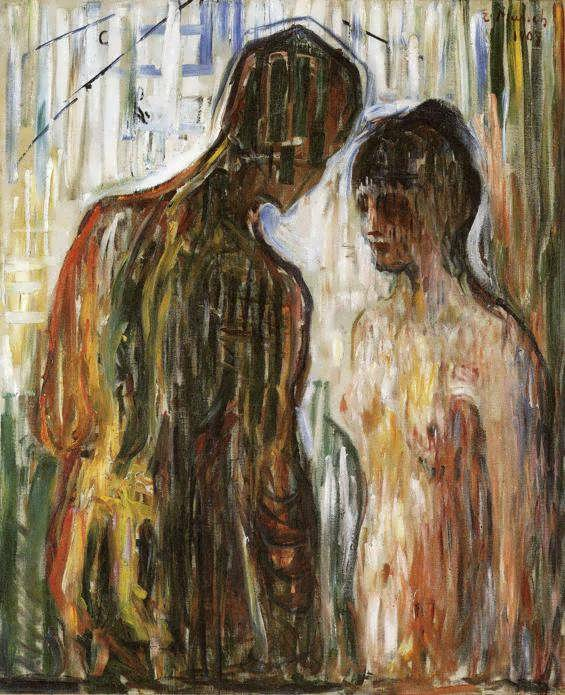
Cupid and Psyche (1907) by Edvard Munch. Munch Museum.

== See also ==
- Beauty and the Beast – French fairy tale
- East of the Sun and West of the Moon – Norwegian fairy tale
- Graciosa and Percinet – French literary fairy tale written by Madame d'Aulnoy
- Pride and Prejudice
- Snow-White and Rose-Red – German fairy tale
- Tulisa, the Wood-Cutter's Daughter (Indian tale)
