= Persephone =

Greek goddess of spring and the queen of the underworld

- Queen of the Underworld; Goddess of the dead, grain, and spring
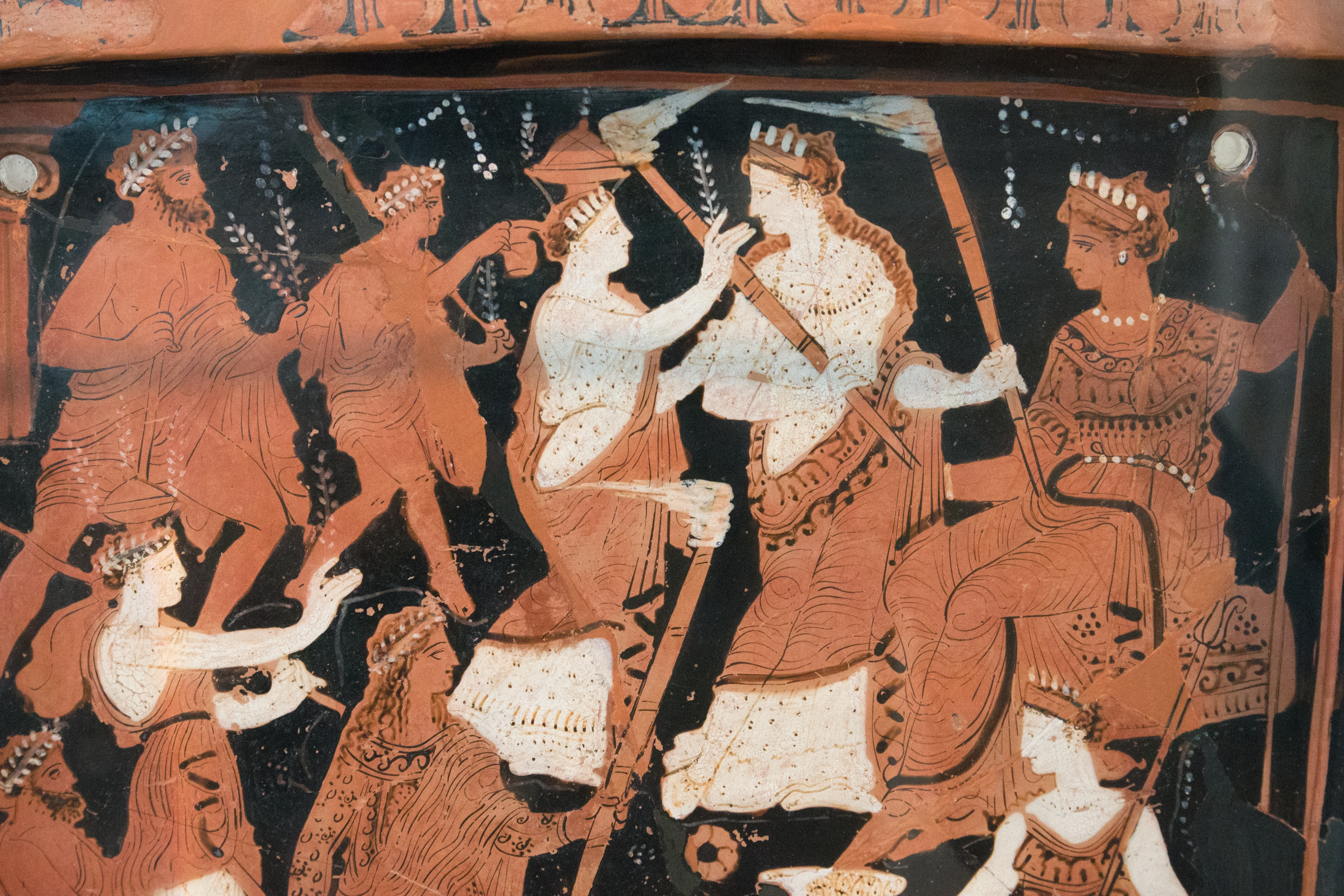
- Persephone bearing torches on the Ninnion Tablet, a votive offering from Eleusis c. 450 BC, National Archaeological Museum of Greece
- Other names: Kore
- Abode: The underworld
- Symbol: Pomegranate, seeds of grain, flaming torch and Flail

Genealogy
- Parents: Zeus and Demeter
- Spouse: Hades

Equivalents
- Roman: Proserpina

In ancient Greek mythology and religion, Persephone (/pərˈsɛfəniː/ Ancient Greek: Περσεφόνη) (Note: Classical pronunciation: [per.se.pʰó.nɛː].) is the daughter of Zeus and Demeter. She became the queen of the underworld after her abduction by her uncle Hades, the king of the underworld, who later took her into marriage. The myth of her abduction, her sojourn in the underworld, and her cyclical return to the surface represents her functions as the embodiment of spring and the personification of vegetation, especially grain crops, which disappear into the earth when sown, remain hidden for a period, sprout from the earth, and are harvested when fully grown.

In Classical Greek art, Persephone is invariably portrayed robed, often carrying a sheaf of grain. She may appear as a mystical divinity with a sceptre and a little box, but she was mostly represented in the process of being carried off by Hades.

Persephone, as a vegetation goddess, and her mother Demeter were the central figures of the Eleusinian Mysteries, which promised the initiated a happy afterlife. The origins of her cult are uncertain, but it was based on ancient agrarian cults of agricultural communities. In Athens, the mysteries celebrated in the month of Anthesterion were dedicated to her. She is a goddess of marriage and childbirth in the region of the city of Epizephyrian Locris, in modern Calabria (southern Italy).

In cult, she was often referred to as Kore (Ancient Greek: Κόρη, lit. 'the Girl') or Cora. The name "Persephone" has multiple historical variants, including Persephassa (Περσεφάσσα) and Persophatta (Περσόφαττα). In Latin, her name is rendered Proserpina. She was identified by the Romans as Libera, an Italic goddess who was conflated with Proserpina. Myths similar to Persephone's descent and return to earth also appear in the cults of male gods, including Attis, Adonis, and Osiris, and in Minoan Crete.

== Name ==
In a Linear B Mycenaean Greek inscription on a tablet found at Pylos dated 1400–1200 BC, John Chadwick reconstructed (Note: The actual word in Linear B is 𐀟𐀩𐁚, pe-re-*82 or pe-re-swa; it is found on the PY Tn 316 tablet.) the name of a goddess, *Preswa, who could be identified with Perse, daughter of Oceanus, and found speculative the further identification with the first element of Persephone. (Note: Comments about the goddess pe-re-*82 of Pylos tablet Tn 316, tentatively reconstructed as *Preswa "It is tempting to see [...] the classical Perse [...] daughter of Oceanus [...] whether it may be further identified with the first element of Persephone is only speculative.") Persephonē (Greek: Περσεφόνη) is her name in the Ionic Greek of epic literature. The Homeric form of her name is Persephoneia (Περσεφονεία, Persephoneia). In other dialects, she was known under variant names: Persephassa (Περσεφάσσα), Persophatta (Περσόφαττα), or simply Korē (Κόρη, "girl, maiden"). On 5th century Attic vases one often encounters the form Perrōphátta (Φερρϖφάττα). Plato calls her Pherepapha (Φερέπαφα) in his Cratylus, "because she is wise and touches that which is in motion", and Phersephona (Φερσεφόνα) in Meno. There are also the forms Periphona (Πηριφόνα) and Phersephassa (Φερσέφασσα). The existence of so many different forms shows how difficult it was for the Greeks to pronounce the word in their own language and suggests that the name may have a Pre-Greek origin.

The etymology of the word "Persephone" is obscure. According to a recent hypothesis advanced by Rudolf Wachter, the first element in the name (Perso- (Περσο-) may well reflect a very rare term, attested in the Rig Veda (Sanskrit parṣa-), and the Avesta, meaning "sheaf of corn" / "ear [of grain]". The second constituent, phatta, preserved in the form Persophatta (Περσόφαττα), would in this view reflect Proto-Indo-European *-gʷn-t-ih, from the root *gʷʰen- "to strike / beat / kill". The combined sense would therefore be "she who beats the ears of corn", i.e., a "thresher of grain" (Περσ (Perse) refers to "grains", εφό (phó) refers to "hitting"/"striking" and -νη (-nē) is a female matronymic suffix; an apropos name for the daughter of Demeter, the goddess of the harvest).

The name of the Albanian dawn-goddess, goddess of love and protector of women, Premtë or P(ë)rende, is thought to correspond regularly to the Ancient Greek counterpart Περσεφάττα (Persephatta), a variant of Περσεφόνη (Persephone). The theonyms have been traced back to the Indo-European *pers-é-bʰ(h₂)n̥t-ih₂ ("she who brings the light through").

A popular folk etymology is from φέρειν φόνον, pherein phonon, "to bring (or cause) death".

== Titles and functions ==
The epithets of Persephone reveal her double function as chthonic and vegetation goddess. The surnames given to her by the poets refer to her role as queen of the lower world and the dead and to the power that shoots forth and withdraws into the earth. Her common name as a vegetation goddess is Kore. Günther Zuntz considers "Persephone" and "Kore" as distinct deities and writes that "no farmer prayed for corn to Persephone; no mourner thought of the dead as being with Kore." Ancient Greek writers were, however, not as consistent as Zuntz claims.

=== Goddess of spring and nature ===
Plutarch writes that Persephone was identified with the spring season, and Cicero calls her the seed of the fruits of the fields. In the Eleusinian Mysteries, her return from the underworld each spring is a symbol of immortality, and she was frequently represented on sarcophagi.

In the Orphic tradition, Persephone is said to be the daughter of Zeus and his mother Rhea, who became Demeter after her seduction by her son. The Orphic Persephone is said to have become by Zeus the mother of Dionysus / Iacchus / Zagreus, and the little-attested Melinoe. (Note: In the Hymn to Melinoe, where the father is Zeus under the guise of Pluto.)

=== Queen of the underworld ===
In mythology and literature she is often called dread(ed) Persephone, and queen of the underworld, within which tradition it was forbidden to speak her name. This tradition comes from her conflation with the very old chthonic divinity Despoina ("[the] mistress"), whose real name could not be revealed to anyone except those initiated into her mysteries. As goddess of death, she was also called a daughter of Zeus and Styx, the river that formed the boundary between Earth and the underworld. In Homer's epics, she appears always together with Hades in the underworld, apparently sharing with Hades control over the dead. In Homer's Odyssey, Odysseus encounters the "dread Persephone" in Tartarus when he visits his dead mother. Odysseus sacrifices a ram to the chthonic goddess Persephone and the ghosts of the dead, who drink the blood of the sacrificed animal. In the reformulation of Greek mythology expressed in the Orphic Hymns, Dionysus and Melinoë are separately called children of Zeus and Persephone. Groves sacred to her stood at the western extremity of the earth on the frontiers of the lower world, which itself was called "house of Persephone".

Her central myth served as the context for the secret rites of regeneration at Eleusis, which promised immortality to initiates.

As wife of Pluto, she sent spectres, ruled the ghosts, and carried into effect the curses of men. The lake of Avernus, as an entrance to the infernal regions, was sacred to her.

=== Nestis ===
In a Classical period text ascribed to Empedocles, c. 490–430 BC, (Note: Empedocles was a Greek pre-Socratic philosopher who was a citizen of Agrigentum, a Greek colony in Sicily.) describing a correspondence among four deities and the classical elements, the name Nestis for water apparently refers to Persephone:

"Now hear the fourfold roots of everything: Enlivening Hera, Hades, shining Zeus, and Nestis, moistening mortal springs with tears."

Of the four deities of Empedocles' elements, it is the name of Persephone alone that is taboo – Nestis is a euphemistic cult title (Note: Kingsley 1995 identifies Nestis as a cult title of Persephone.) – for she was also the terrible Queen of the Dead, whose name was not safe to speak aloud, who was euphemistically named simply as Kore or "the Maiden", a vestige of her archaic role as the deity ruling the underworld. Nestis means "the Fasting One" in ancient Greek.

=== Epithets ===
As a goddess of the underworld, Persephone was given euphemistically-friendly names and epithets. However, it is possible that some of them were the names of original goddesses:

- Aristi Chthonia (Ancient Greek: Ἀρίστη Χθονία), lit. the "Best Chthonic [Goddess]".
- Brimo (Ancient Greek: Βριμώ), lit. "Angry" or "Terrifying". An epithet Persephone shares with her mother, Demeter, Hecate and others.
- Chthonia (Χθονία, Khthónĭă); literally "She of the Earth", an epithet Persephone shares with her mother, Demeter, and others.
- Chthonia Ắnăssă (Χθονία Ᾰνᾰσσᾰ), lit. "Subterranean Queen"; used in the Orphic Hymn to Persephone, along with "Praxidike".
- Despoina (dems-potnia, Δέσποινα, Déspoina) the "Mistress" or "Matriarch" (literally "the mistress of the house")
- Epaine (Ancient Greek: Ἐπαίνη, lit. "Dread" or the "Fearful One"); can also translate from Ancient Greek: ἔπαινος, meaning "Praise").
- Hagne (Ἁγνή, Hagnḗ), lit. "pure", "holy" (ἁγνὴ Φερσεφόνεια (Hagnē Phersephoneia), lit. "Holy Persephone"), originally a goddess of the springs in Messenia.
- MalivinaAncient Greek: Μαλιβίνα, lit. "Sweet Friend", "Soft". An euphemistically-friendly epithet Persephone shares with Hecate.
- Melindia or Melinoia (meli, "honey"), as the consort of Hades, in Hermione. (Compare Hecate, Melinoë)
- Melitodes (Μελιτώδης), "mellifluous", "sweet as honey"
- Praxidike (Ancient Greek: Πραξιδίκη, Praxidikê), lit. ""Practical Justice", "Exacter of Justice"; the Orphic Hymn to Persephone identifies Praxidike as an epithet of Persephone: "Praxidike, Subterranean Queen. The Eumenides' source [mother], fair-haired, whose frame proceeds from Zeus' ineffable and secret seeds."

As a vegetation goddess, she was called:

- Auxesia, as the goddess who grants growth and prosperity to the fields.
- Azesia, similar epithet of a growth and harvest nature
- Kore, "the maiden".
- Kore Soteira, "the Savior Maiden", in Megalopolis.
- Neotera, "[the] Younger Earth", in Eleusis, distinguishing Persephone from her mother.
- Nestis (Νήστις), lit. "the Fasting One"; Used by Empedocles as a euphemism for Persephone, referring to her role in bringing winter and how food is scarce and should be stockpiled before winter arrives.
- Kore of Demeter Hagne in the Homeric hymn.
- Kore Memagmeni, "the mixed daughter" (bread).
- Soteira, "the Savior", in Megalopolis.

Demeter and her daughter Persephone were usually called:

- The goddesses, often distinguished as "the older" and "the younger" in Eleusis.
- Demeters, in Rhodes and Sparta
- The thesmophoroi, "the legislators" in the Thesmophoria.
- Karpophoroi, "the bringers of fruit", in Tegea

== Mythology ==
=== Abduction myth ===
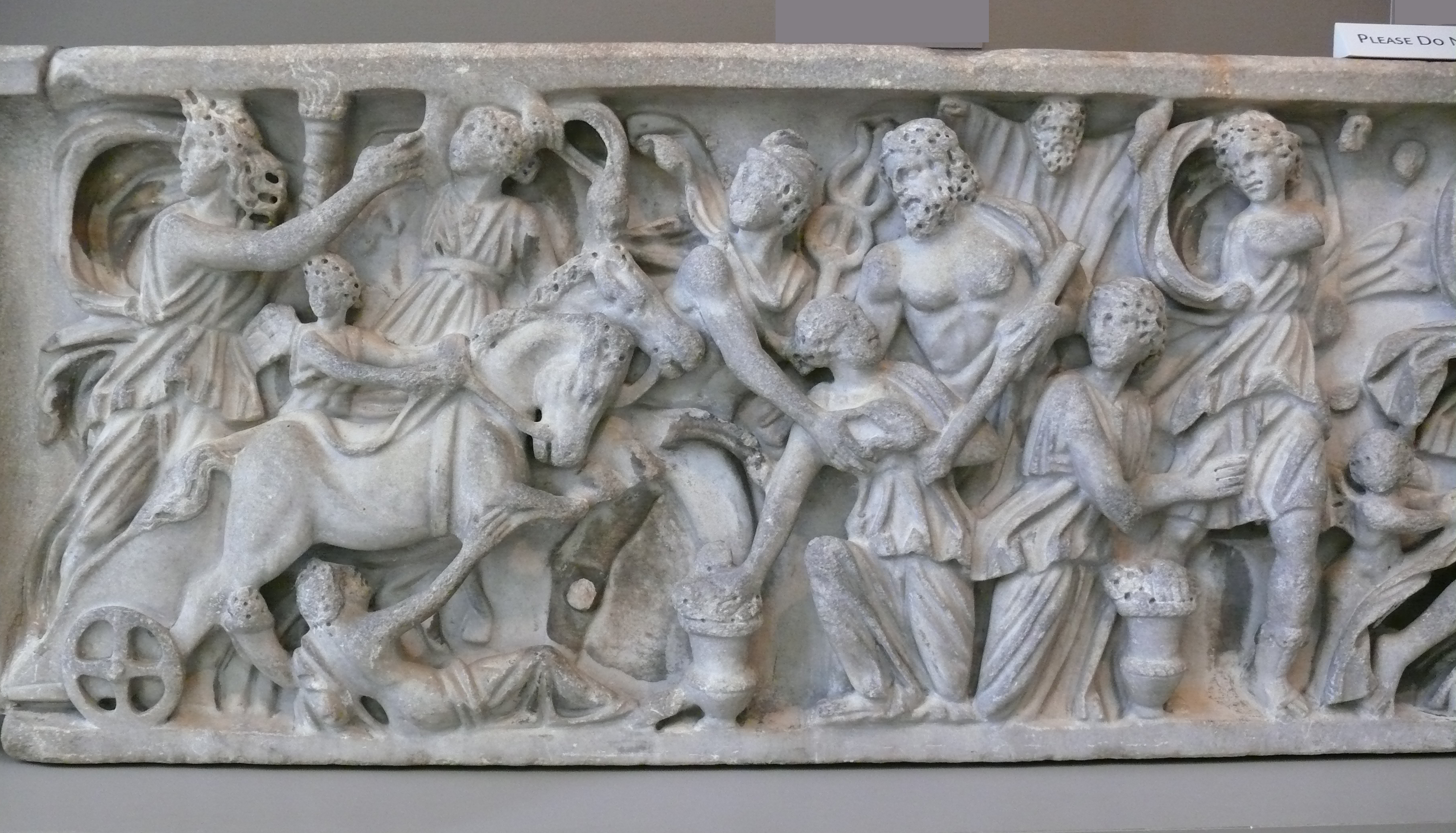
Sarcophagus with the abduction of Persephone. Walters Art Museum. Baltimore, Maryland

Persephone's abduction by Hades (Note: In art the abduction of Persephone is often referred to as the "Rape of Persephone".) is mentioned briefly in Hesiod's Theogony, and is told in considerable detail in the Homeric Hymn to Demeter. Zeus, it is said, permitted Hades, who was in love with the beautiful Persephone, to abduct her as her mother Demeter was not likely to allow her daughter to go down to Hades. Persephone was gathering flowers, along with the Oceanids and the goddesses Pallas Athena and Artemis, as the Homeric Hymn says, in a field when Hades came to abduct her, bursting through a cleft in the earth. In another version of the myth, Persephone had her own personal companions whom Demeter turned into the half bird sirens as punishment for failing to prevent her daughter's abduction.

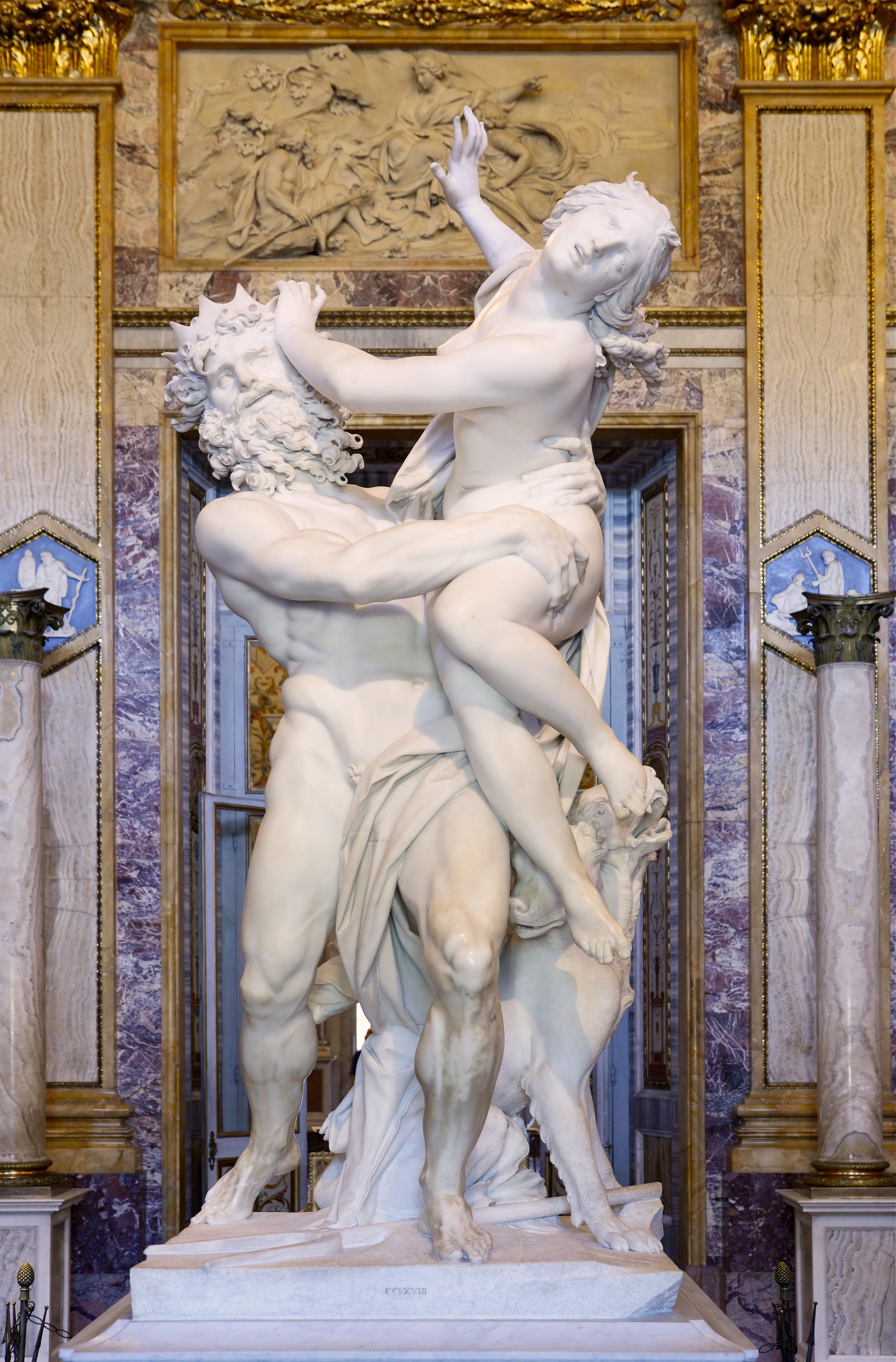
The Rape of Proserpina by Gian Lorenzo Bernini (1621–22) at the Galleria Borghese in Rome

When Persephone was abducted by Hades, the shepherd Eumolpus and the swineherd Eubuleus saw a girl in a black chariot driven by an invisible driver being carried off into the earth which had violently opened up. Eubuleus was feeding his pigs at the opening to the underworld, and his swine were swallowed by the earth along with her. This aspect of the myth is an etiology for the relation of pigs with the ancient rites in Thesmophoria, and in Eleusis.

Various local traditions place Persephone's abduction in different locations. The Sicilians, among whom her worship was probably introduced by the Corinthian and Megarian colonists, believed that Hades found her in the meadows near Enna, and that a well arose on the spot where he descended with her into the lower world. The Cretans thought that their own island had been the scene of the abduction, and the Eleusinians mentioned the Nysian plain in Boeotia, and said that Persephone had descended with Hades into the lower world at the entrance of the western Oceanus. Later accounts place the abduction in Attica, near Athens, or near Eleusis. The Homeric hymn mentions the Nysion (or Mysion) which was probably a mythical place. The location of this mythical place may simply be a convention to show that a magically distant chthonic land of myth was intended in the remote past.

After Persephone had disappeared, Demeter searched for her all over the earth with Hecate's torches. In most versions, she forbids the earth to produce, or she neglects the earth and, in the depth of her despair, she causes nothing to grow. Helios, the Sun, who sees everything, eventually told Demeter what had happened and at length she discovered where her daughter had been taken. Zeus, pressed by the cries of the hungry people and by the other deities who also heard their anguish, forced Hades to return Persephone.

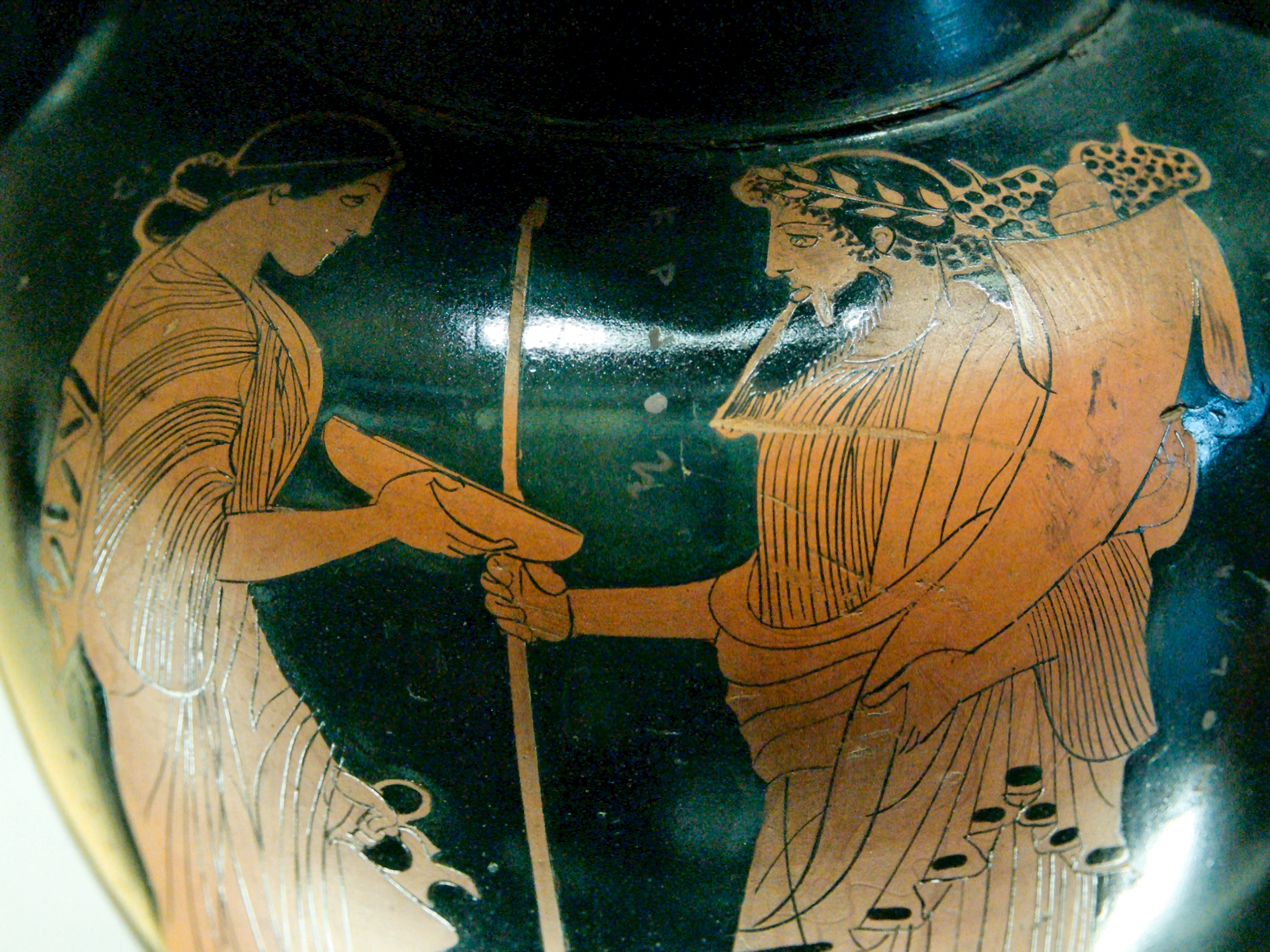
Hades (right) and Persephone (left). Detail from an Attic red-figure amphora, ca. 470 BC. From Italy. Louvre

When Hades was informed of Zeus' command to return Persephone, he complied with the request, but he first tricked her into eating pomegranate seeds. (Note: The Homeric Hymn to Demeter, has Persephone tell Demeter: "he secretly put in my mouth sweet food, a pomegranate seed (ῥοιῆς κόκκον), and forced me to taste against my will." Gantz describes this as a "trick".) Hermes was sent to retrieve Persephone but, because she had tasted the food of the underworld, she was obliged to spend a third of each year (the winter months) there, and the remaining part of the year with the gods above. With the later writers Ovid and Hyginus, Persephone's time in the underworld becomes half the year. It was explained to Demeter, her mother, that she would be released, so long as she did not taste the food of the underworld, as that was an Ancient Greek example of a taboo. In some versions, Ascalaphus informed the other deities that Persephone had eaten the pomegranate seeds. As punishment for informing Hades, he was pinned under a heavy rock in the underworld by either Persephone or Demeter until Heracles freed him, causing Demeter to turn him into an eagle owl.

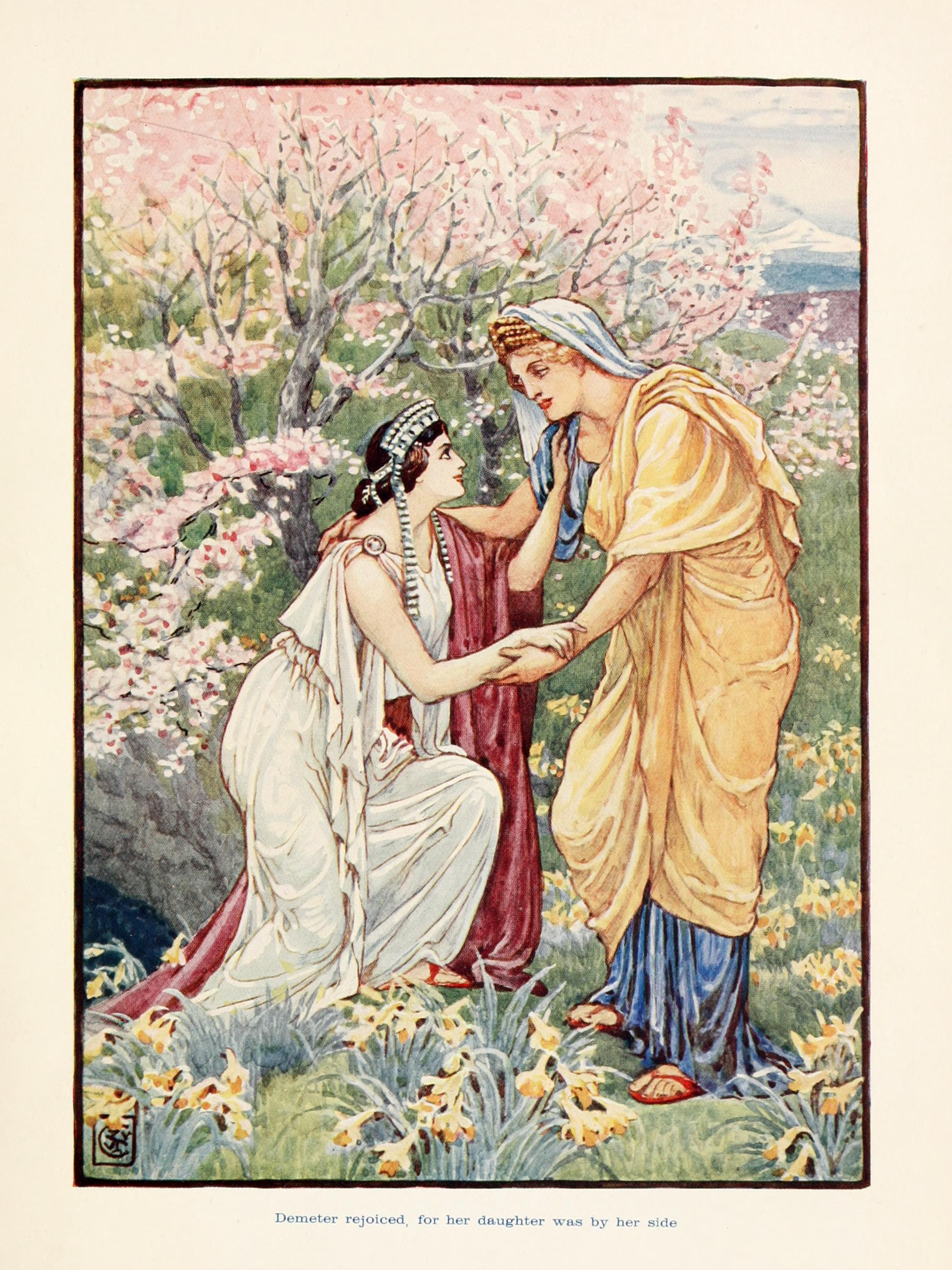
Demeter rejoiced, for her beloved daughter was by her side, by Walter Crane

In an earlier version, Hecate rescued Persephone. On an Attic red-figured bell krater of c. 440 BC in the Metropolitan Museum of Art, Persephone is rising as if up stairs from a cleft in the earth, while Hermes stands aside; Hecate, holding two torches, looks back as she leads her to the enthroned Demeter.

In the hymn, Persephone eventually returns from the underworld and is reunited with her mother near Eleusis. The Eleusinians built a temple near the spring of Callichorus, and Demeter establishes her mysteries there.

Regardless of how she had eaten pomegranate seeds and how many, the ancient Greeks told the myth of Persephone to explain the origin of the four seasons. The ancient Greeks believed that spring and summer occurred during the months Persephone stayed with Demeter, who would make flowers bloom and crops grow bountiful. During the other months when Persephone must live in the underworld with Hades, Demeter expressed her sadness by letting the earth go barren and covering it with snow, resulting in autumn and winter.

==== Variations ====
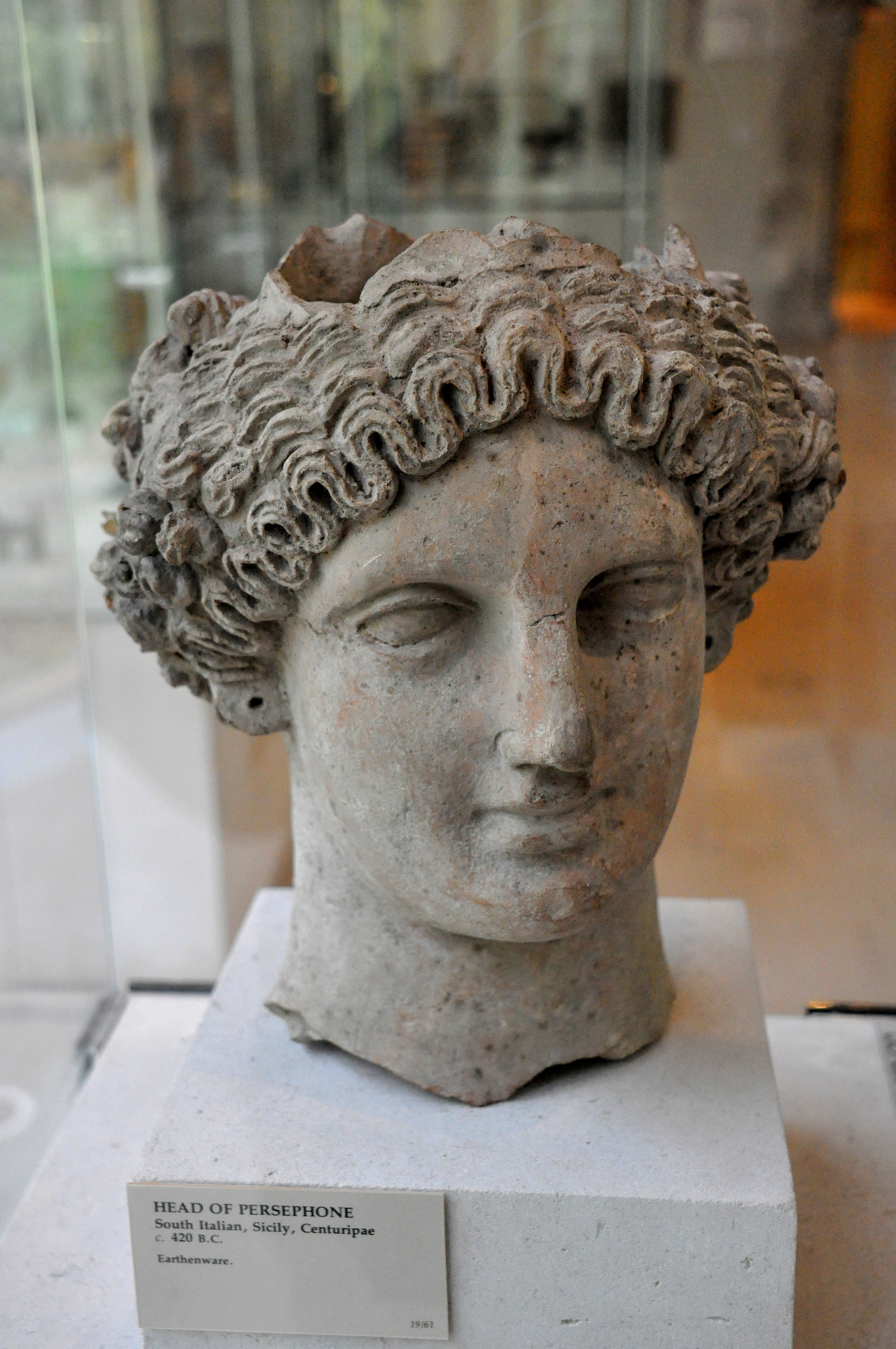
Head of Persephone. Earthenware. From Sicily, Centuripae, c. 420 BC. The Burrell Collection, Glasgow, UK

In the Orphic "Rhapsodic Theogony" (first century BC/AD), Persephone is described as the daughter of Zeus and Rhea. Zeus was filled with desire for his mother, Rhea, intending to marry her. He pursued the unwilling Rhea, only for her to change into a serpent.

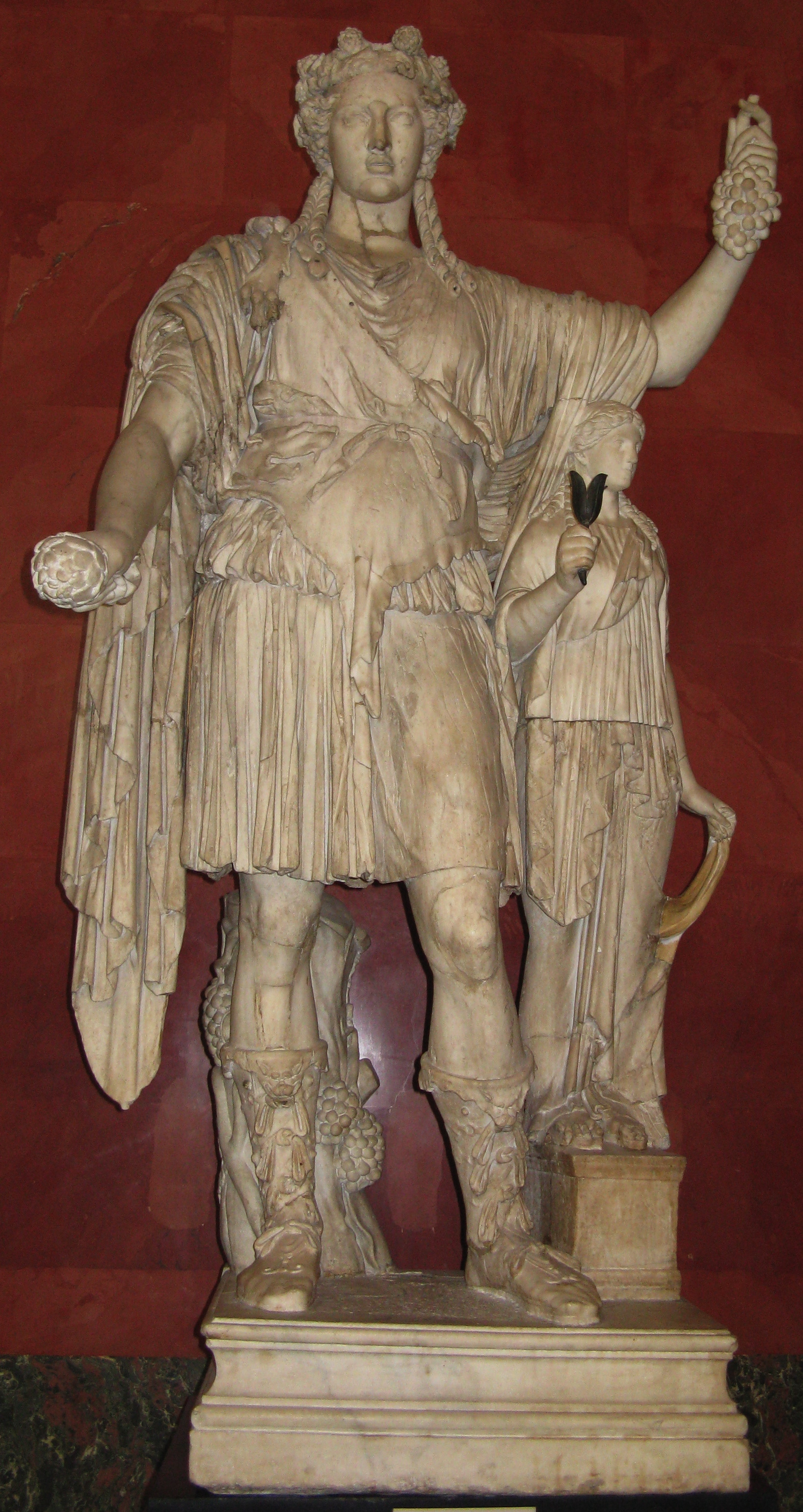
Persephone and Dionysos. Roman copy after a Greek original of the 4th–3rd century B.C. marble, Hermitage

Zeus also turned himself into a serpent and raped Rhea, which resulted in the birth of Persephone. Afterwards, Rhea became Demeter. Persephone was born so deformed that Rhea ran away from her frightened, and did not breastfeed Persephone. Zeus then mates with Persephone, who gives birth to Dionysus. She later stays in her mother's house, guarded by the Curetes. Rhea-Demeter prophesies that Persephone will marry Apollo.

This prophecy does not come true, however, as while weaving a dress, Persephone is abducted by Hades to be his bride. She becomes the mother of the Erinyes by Hades. In Nonnus's Dionysiaca, the gods of Olympus were bewitched by Persephone's beauty and desired her.

Hermes, Apollo, Ares, and Hephaestus each presented Persephone with a gift to woo her. Demeter, worried that Persephone might end up marrying Hephaestus, consults the astrological god Astraeus. Astraeus warns her that Persephone will be ravished and impregnated by a serpent. Demeter then hides Persephone in a cave; but Zeus, in the form of a serpent, enters the cave and rapes Persephone. Persephone becomes pregnant and gives birth to Zagreus.

It was said that while Persephone was playing with the nymph Hercyna, Hercyna held a goose against her that she let loose. The goose flew to a hollow cave and hid under a stone; when Persephone took up the stone in order to retrieve the bird, water flowed from that spot, and hence the river received the name Hercyna. This was when she was abducted by Hades according to Boeotian legend; a vase shows water birds accompany the goddesses Demeter and Hecate who are in search of the missing Persephone.

==== Interpretation of the myth ====
The abduction of Persephone is an etiological myth providing an explanation for the changing of the seasons. Since Persephone had consumed pomegranate seeds in the underworld, she was forced to spend four months, or in other versions six months for six seeds, with Hades. When Persephone would return to the underworld, Demeter's despair at losing her daughter would cause the vegetation and flora of the world to wither, signifying the autumn and winter seasons. When Persephone's time was over and she was reunited with her mother, Demeter's joyousness would cause the vegetation of the earth to bloom and blossom which signifies the spring and summer seasons. This also explains why Persephone is associated with spring: her re-emergence from the underworld signifies the onset of spring. Therefore, not only does Persephone and Demeter's annual reunion symbolize the changing seasons and the beginning of a new cycle of growth for the crops, it also symbolizes death and the regeneration of life.

In another interpretation of the myth, the abduction of Persephone by Hades, in the form of Ploutus (πλούτος, wealth), represents the wealth of the grain contained and stored in underground silos or ceramic jars (pithoi) during the summer seasons (as that was drought season in Greece). In this telling, Persephone as grain-maiden symbolizes the grain within the pithoi that is trapped underground within the realm of Hades. In the beginning of the autumn, when the grain of the old crop is laid on the fields, she ascends and is reunited with her mother Demeter. This interpretation of Persephone's abduction myth symbolizes the cycle of life and death as Persephone both dies as she (the grain) is buried in the pithoi (as similar pithoi were used in ancient times for funerary practices) and is reborn with the exhumation and spreading of the grain.

Bruce Lincoln argues that the myth is a description of the loss of Persephone's virginity, where her epithet koure signifies "a girl of initiatory age", and where Hades is the male oppressor forcing himself onto a young girl for the first time.

=== Adonis ===
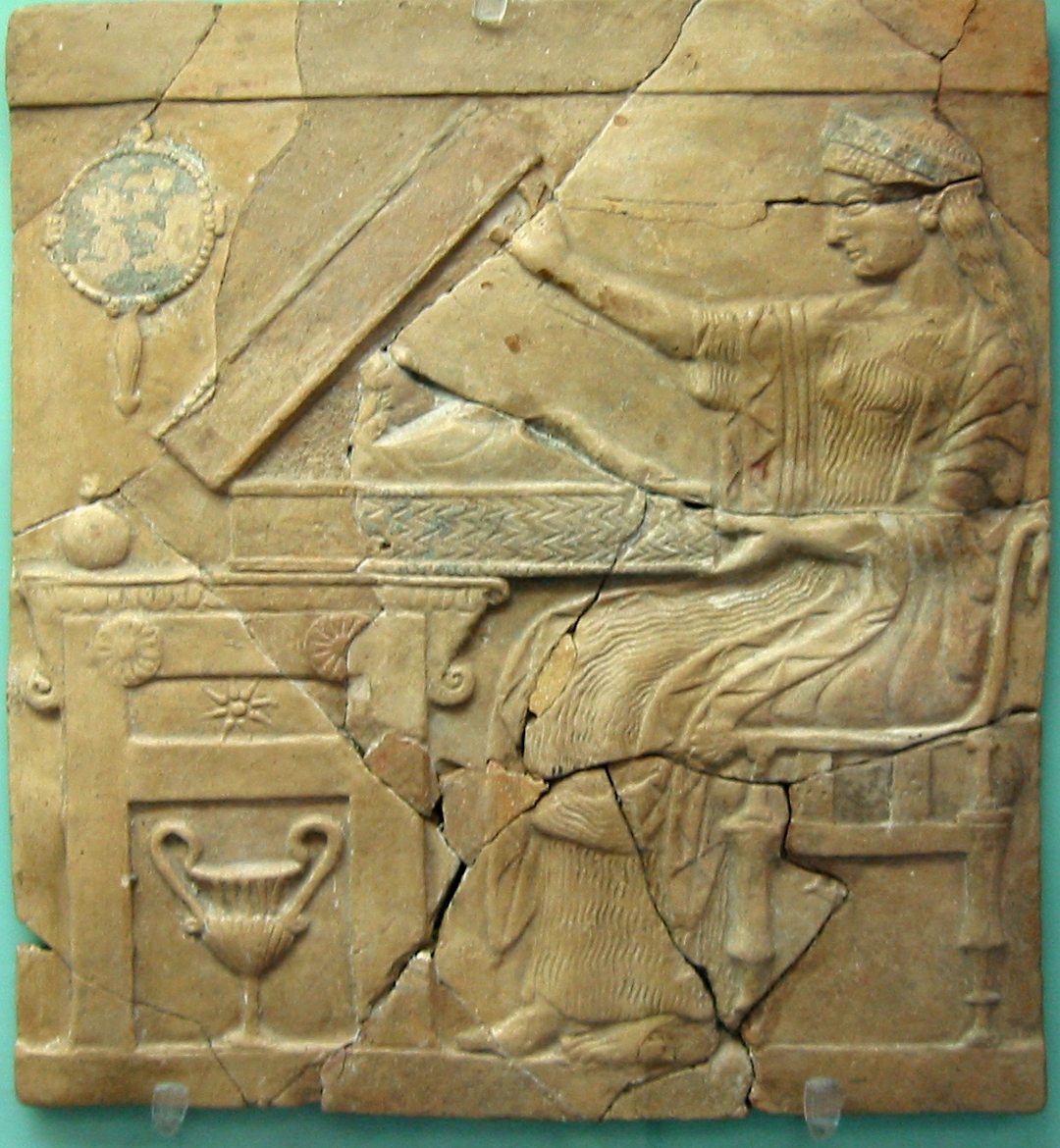
Persephone opening a cista containing the infant Adonis, on a pinax from Epizephyrian Locris

Adonis was an exceedingly beautiful mortal man with whom Persephone fell in love. After he was born, Aphrodite entrusted him to Persephone to raise. But when Persephone got a glimpse of the beautiful Adonis—finding him as attractive as Aphrodite did—she refused to give him back to her. The matter was brought before Zeus, and he decreed that Adonis would spend one third of the year with each goddess, and have the last third for himself. Adonis chose to spend his own portion of the year with Aphrodite. Alternatively, Adonis had to spend one half of the year with each goddess at the suggestion of the Muse Calliope. Of them, Aelian wrote that Adonis' life was divided between two goddesses: one who loved him beneath the earth, and one above, while the satirical author Lucian of Samosata has Aphrodite complain to the moon goddess Selene that Eros made Persephone fall in love with her own beloved, and now she has to share Adonis with her. In another variation, Persephone met Adonis only after he had been slain by a boar; Aphrodite descended into the Underworld to take him back. But Persephone, smitten with him, would not let him go until they came to an agreement that Adonis would alternate between the land of the living and the land of the dead each year.

=== Wrath myths ===
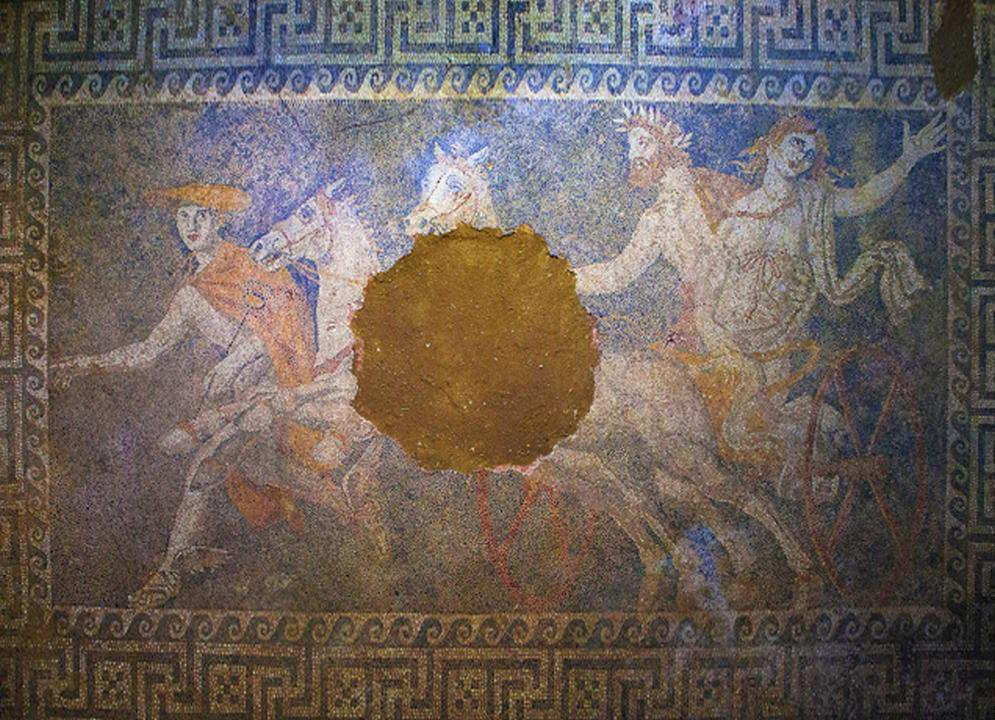
A mosaic of the Kasta Tomb in Amphipolis depicting the abduction of Persephone by Pluto, 4th century BC

Once, Hermes chased Persephone (or Hecate) with the aim to rape her; but the goddess snored or roared in anger, frightening him off so that he desisted, hence her earning the name "Brimo" ("angry").

Ascalaphus was the custodian of Hades' orchard in the Underworld. He told the other gods that Persephone had eaten pomegranate seeds in the Underworld. Because she had tasted food in the underworld, Persephone was obliged to return to the Underworld and spend four months (in later versions six months) there every year. Furious, Persephone herself changed him into an eagle owl by sprinkling him with water of the river Phlegethon. In other versions, Demeter was the one who transformed Ascalaphus into the bird after Heracles moved the stone she pinned him under.

Minthe was a Naiad nymph of the river Cocytus who was a mistress of Hades. Persephone was not slow to notice when Minthe declared her intentions to replace her as queen and, in jealousy, trampled the nymph, killing her and turning her into a mint plant. Alternatively, Persephone tore Minthe to pieces for sleeping with Hades, and it was he who turned his former lover into the sweet-smelling plant. In another version, Minthe had been Hades's lover before he met Persephone. When Minthe claims that Hades will return to her because she is lovelier and more queenly than Persephone, Demeter kills Minthe over the insult done to her daughter.

After a plague hit Aonia, its people asked the oracle of Apollo Gortynius, and they were told they needed to appease the anger of the king and queen of the underworld by means of sacrifice of two willing maidens. Two maidens, Menippe and Metioche (who were the daughters of Orion), were chosen and they agreed to be offered to the two gods in order to save their country. After the two girls sacrificed themselves with their shuttles, Persephone and Hades took pity on them and turned their dead bodies into comets.

=== Favour myths ===
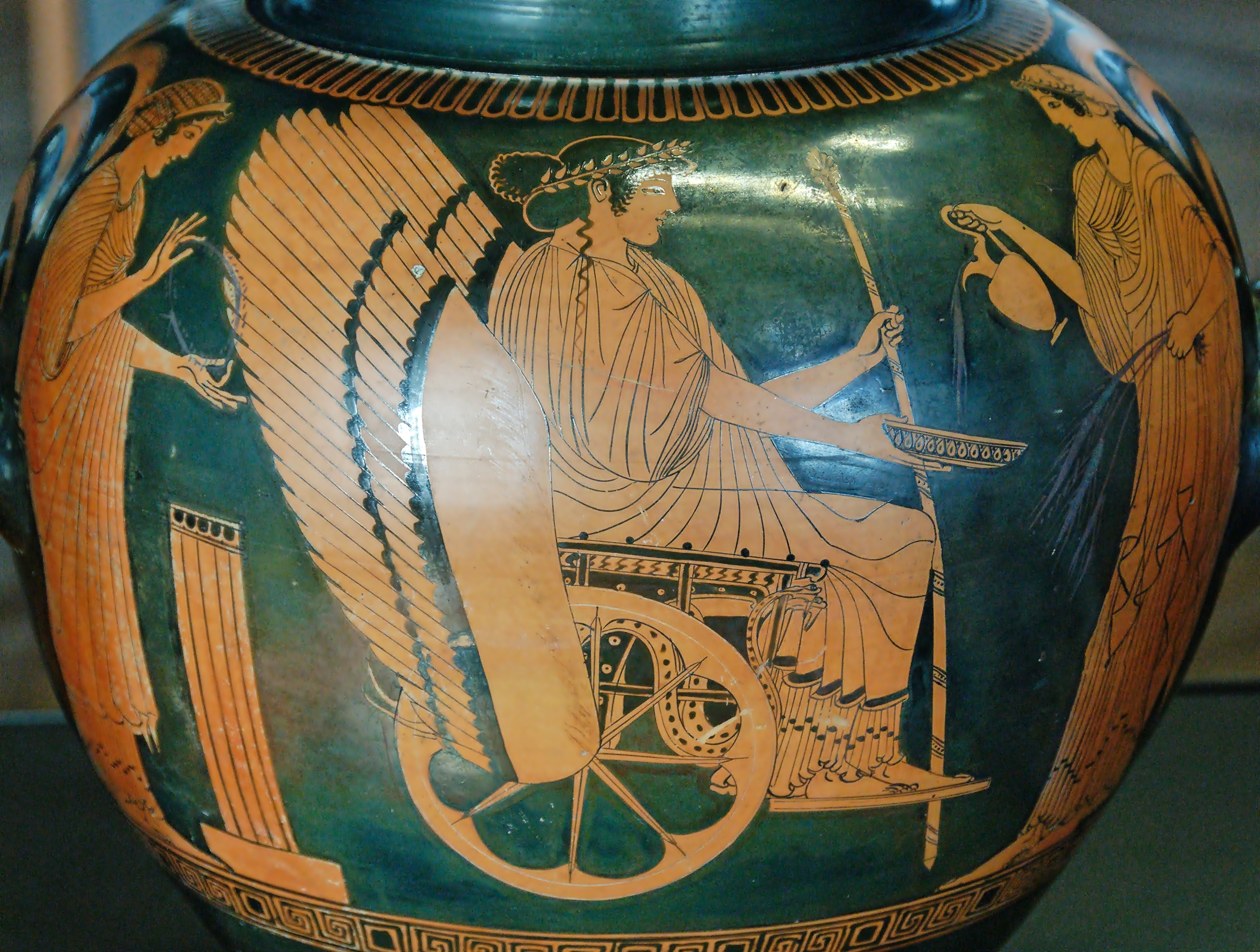
Triptolemus, Demeter and Persephone by the Triptolemos-painter, c. 470 BC, Louvre

Socrates in Plato's Cratylus previously mentions that Hades consorts with Persephone due to her wisdom.

Demeter and Persephone, once restored to her mother, cared for Triptolemus, and helped him complete his mission of educating the whole world in the art of agriculture.

When Dionysus descended into the Underworld accompanied by Demeter to retrieve his dead mother Semele and bring her back to the land of the living, he is said to have offered a myrtle plant to Persephone in exchange for Semele. On a neck amphora from Athens, Dionysus is depicted riding on a chariot with his mother, next to a myrtle-holding Persephone who stands with her own mother Demeter; many vases from Athens depict Dionysus in the company of Persephone and Demeter.

When Queen Echemeia of Kos ceased to offer worship to Artemis, the goddess shot her with an arrow. Persephone, witnessing that, snatched the still living Euthemia and brought her to the Underworld.

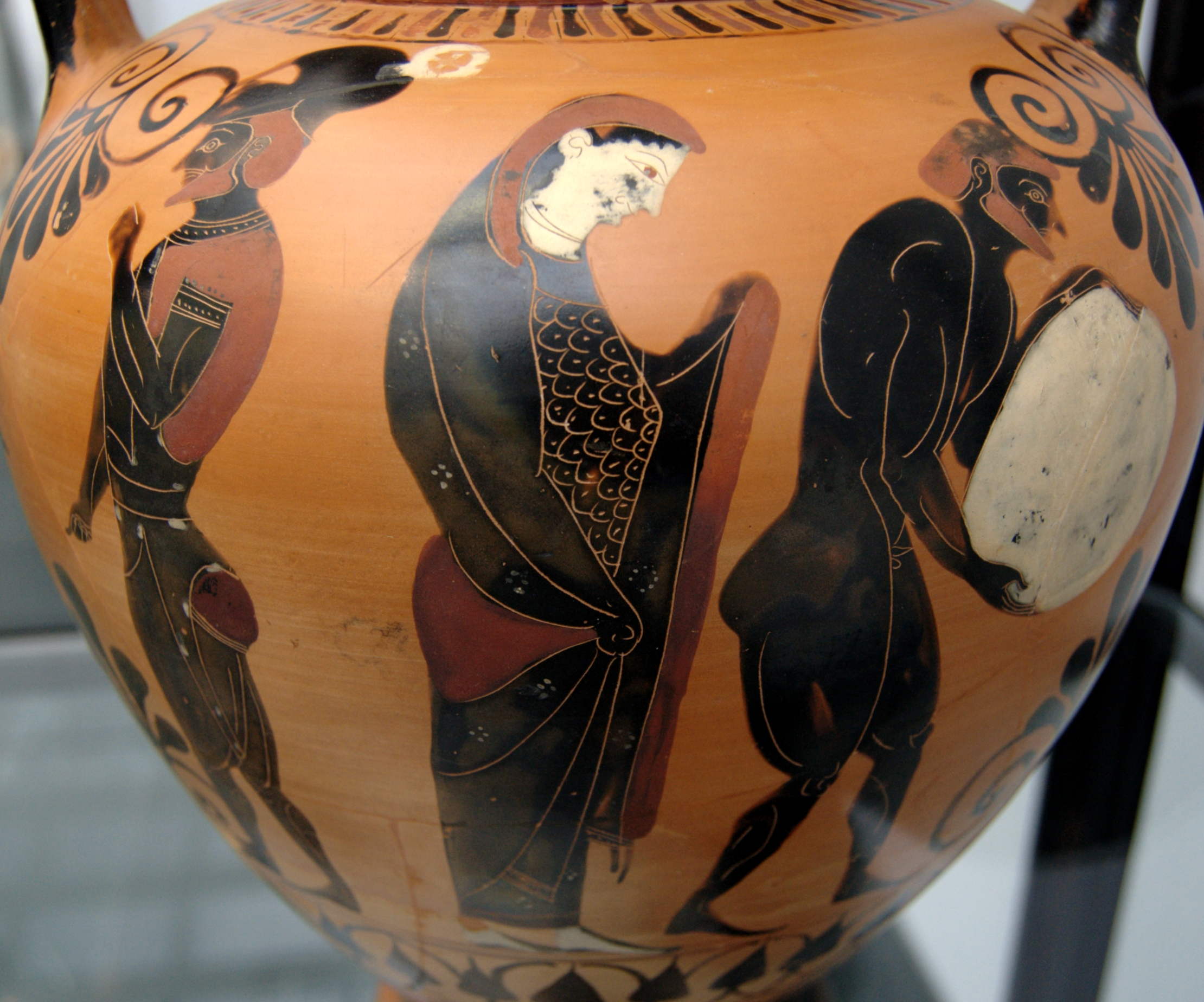
Nekyia. Persephone supervising Sisyphus pushing his rock in the Underworld. Attic black-figure amphora, ca. 530 BC. From Vulci. Staatliche Antikensammlungen

Persephone allowed the shade of Tiresias to retain his mental prowess and powers of clairvoyance after death.

Persephone convinced Hades to allow the hero Protesilaus to return to the world of the living for a limited period of time to see his wife.

The hero Orpheus once descended into the underworld seeking to take back to the land of the living his late wife Eurydice, who died when a snake bit her. The music he played was so lovely that it charmed Persephone and Hades. So entranced was Persephone by Orpheus' sweet melody that she persuaded her husband to let the unfortunate hero take his wife back.

Sisyphus, the wily king of Corinth, managed to avoid staying dead, after Thanatos had gone to collect him, by appealing to and tricking Persephone into letting him go; thus Sisyphus returned to the light of the sun in the surface above.

=== Besbicus island ===
According to legend, Persephone created the island of Besbicus to protect Cyzicus from the Giants attempting to block the mouth of the Rhyndakos.

== Worship ==
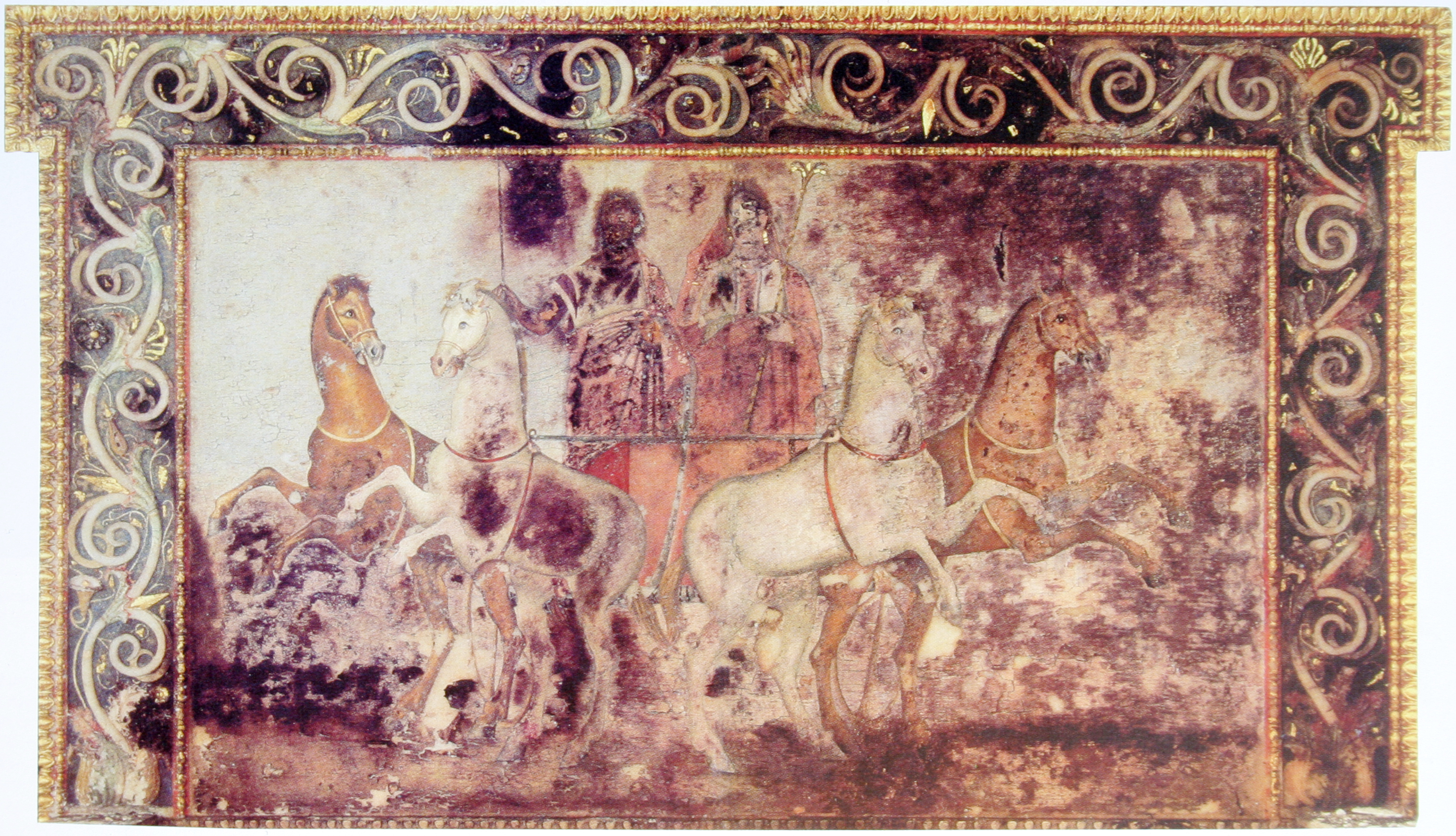
A fresco showing Hades and Persephone riding in a chariot, from the tomb of Queen Eurydice I of Macedon at Vergina, Greece, 4th century BC

Persephone was worshipped along with her mother Demeter and in the same mysteries. Her cults included agrarian magic, dancing, and rituals. The priests used special vessels and holy symbols, and the people participated with rhymes. In Eleusis there is evidence of sacred laws and other inscriptions.

The Cult of Demeter and the Maiden is found at Attica, in the main festivals Thesmophoria and Eleusinian Mysteries and in a number of local cults. These festivals were almost always celebrated at the autumn sowing, and at full moon according to the Greek tradition. In some local cults the feasts were dedicated to Demeter.

=== Origins ===
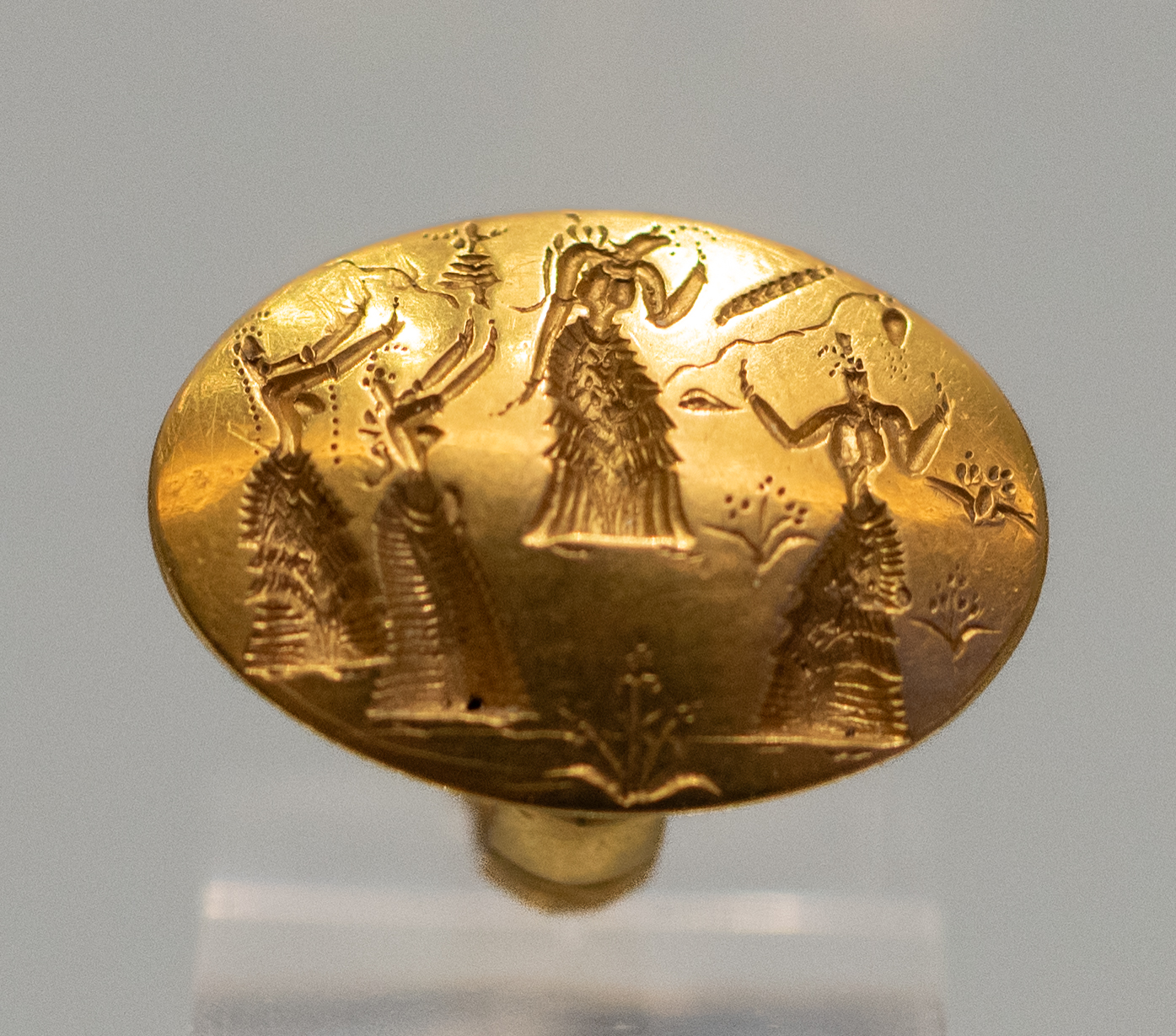
Gold ring from Isopata tomb, near Knossos, Crete, 1400–1500 BC. Depicted are female figures dancing among blossoming vegetation; Heraklion Archaeological Museum

The location of Persephone's abduction is different in each local cult. The Homeric Hymn to Demeter mentions the "plain of Nysa". The locations of this probably mythical place may simply be conventions to show that a magically distant chthonic land of myth was intended in the remote past. (Note: "In Greek mythology Nysa is a mythical mountain with unknown location, the birthplace of the god Dionysos.") Demeter found and met her daughter in Eleusis, and this is the mythical disguise of what happened in the mysteries.

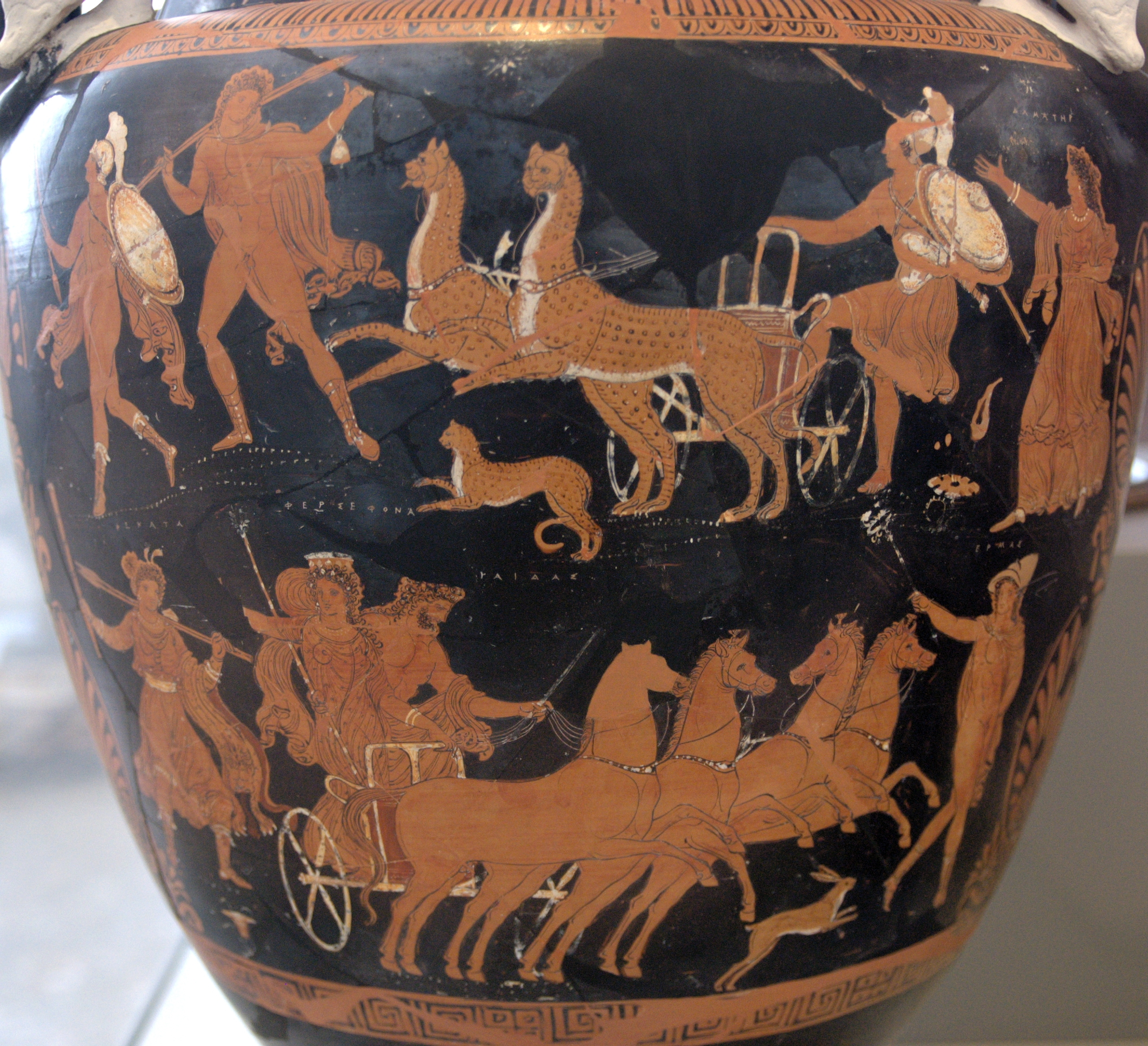
Rape of Persephone. Hades with his horses and Persephone (down). An Apulian red-figure volute krater, c. 340 BC. Antikensammlung Berlin

In his 1985 book on Greek Religion, Walter Burkert claimed that Persephone is an old chthonic deity of the agricultural communities, who received the souls of the dead into the earth, and acquired powers over the fertility of the soil, over which she reigned. The earliest depiction of a goddess Burkert claims may be identified with Persephone growing out of the ground, is on a plate from the Old-Palace period in Phaistos. According to Burkert, the figure looks like a vegetable because she has snake lines on other side of her. On either side of the vegetable person there is a dancing girl. A similar representation, where the goddess appears to come down from the sky, is depicted on the Minoan ring of Isopata.

The cults of Persephone and Demeter in the Eleusinian mysteries and in the Thesmophoria were based on old agrarian cults. The beliefs of these cults were closely-guarded secrets, kept hidden because they were believed to offer believers a better place in the afterlife than in miserable Hades. There is evidence that some practices were derived from the religious practices of the Mycenaean age. Kerenyi asserts that these religious practices were introduced from Minoan Crete. The idea of immortality which appears in the syncretistic religions of the Near East did not exist in the Eleusinian Mysteries at the very beginning. (Note: "According to the Greek popular belief, ἕν ἀνδρῶν, ἕν θεῶν γένος".(One is the nature of men, another one the nature of gods))

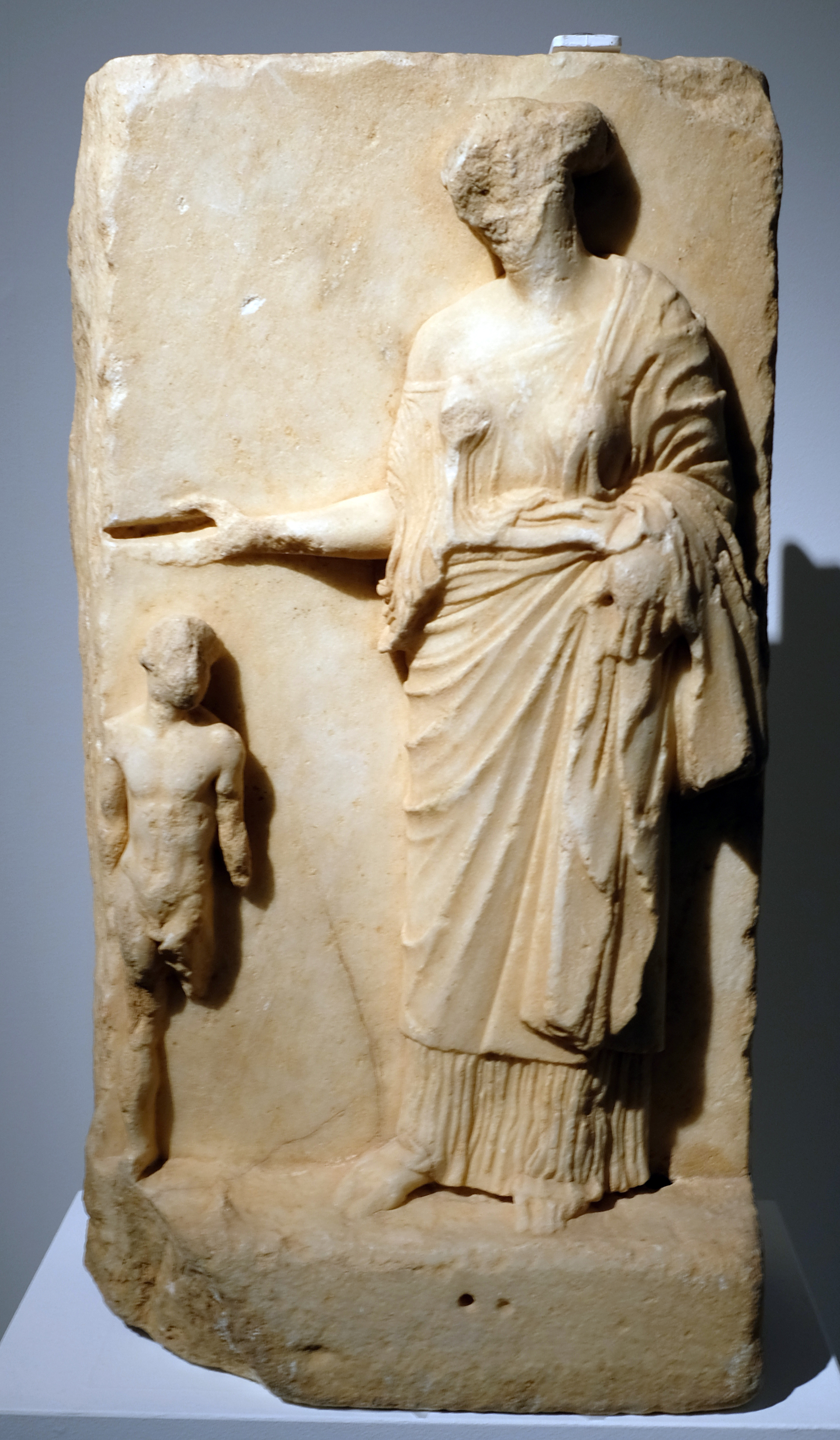
Votive relief of Persephone as a hydranos, 5th century BC Eleusis, Archaeological Museum of Eleusis.

=== In the Near East and Minoan Crete ===
Walter Burkert believed that elements of the Persephone myth had origins in the Minoan religion. This belief system had unique characteristics, particularly the appearance of the goddess from above in the dance. Dance floors have been discovered in addition to "vaulted tombs", and it seems that the dance was ecstatic. Homer memorializes the dance floor which Daedalus built for Ariadne in the remote past. A gold ring from a tomb in Isopata depicts four women dancing among flowers, the goddess floating above them. An image plate from the first palace of Phaistos seems to depict the ascent of Persephone: a figure grows from the ground, with a dancing girl on each side and stylized flowers all around. The depiction of the goddess is similar to later images of "Anodos of Pherephata". On the Dresden vase, Persephone is growing out of the ground, and she is surrounded by the animal-tailed agricultural gods Silenoi.

Despoina and "Hagne" were probably euphemistic surnames of Persephone, therefore Karl Kerenyi theorizes that the cult of Persephone was the continuation of the worship of a Minoan Great goddess. It is possible that some religious practices, especially the mysteries, were transferred from a Cretan priesthood to Eleusis, where Demeter brought the poppy from Crete. Besides these similarities, Burkert explains that up to now it is not known to what extent one can and must differentiate between Minoan and Mycenean religion. (Note: "To what extent one can and must differentiate between Minoan and Mycenaean religion is a question which has not yet found a conclusive answer".) In the Anthesteria Dionysos is the "divine child".

=== In Mycenaean Greece ===
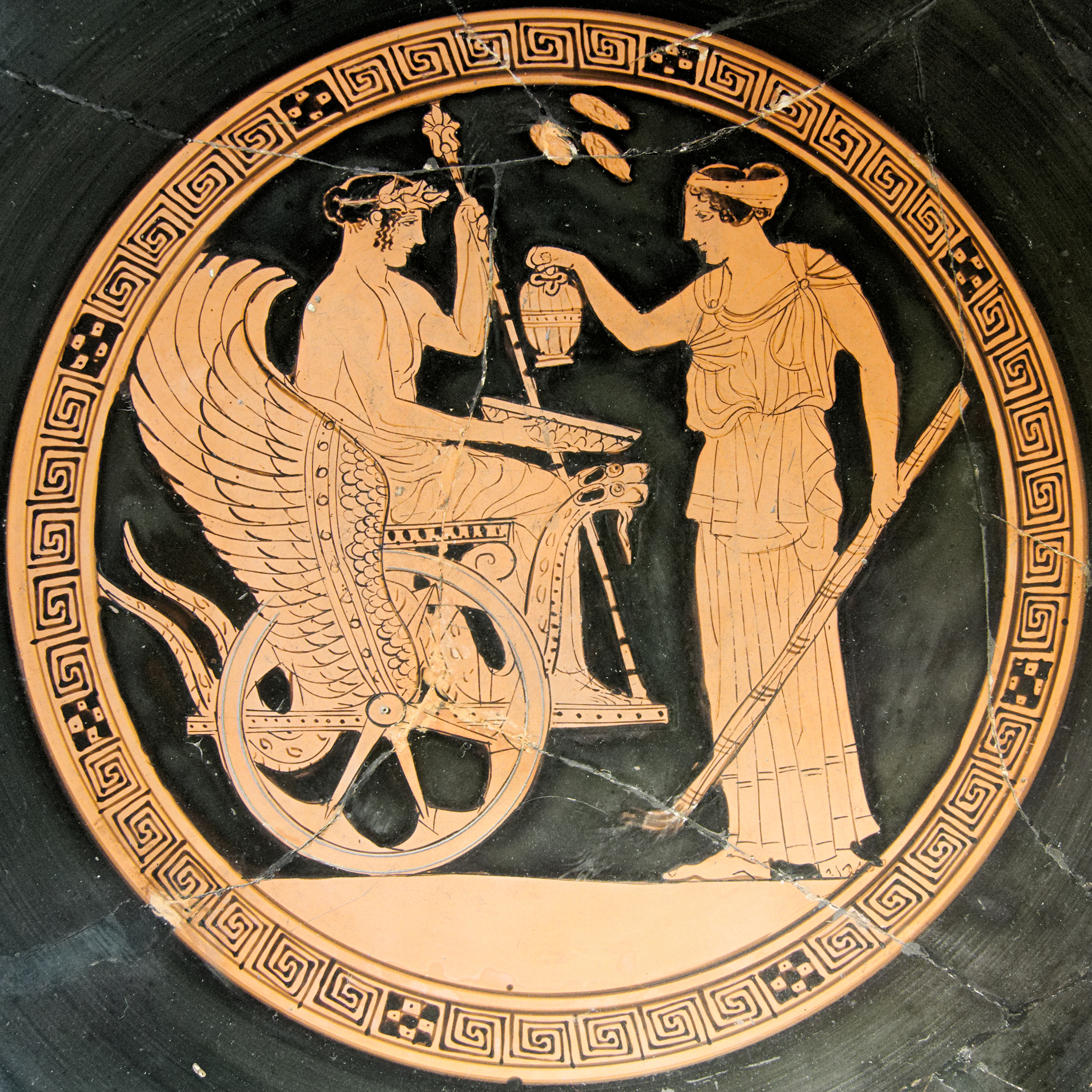
Triptolemus and Kore, tondo of an Attic red-figure bowl by the Aberdeen Painter, c.470~460 BCE. (Louvre, Paris)

There is evidence of a cult in Eleusis from the Mycenean period; however, there are not sacral finds from this period. The cult was private and there is no information about it. As well as the names of some Greek gods in the Mycenean Greek inscriptions, names of goddesses who do not have Mycenean origin appear, such as "the divine Mother" (the mother of the gods) or "the Goddess (or priestess) of the winds". In historical times, Demeter and Kore were usually referred to as "the goddesses" or "the mistresses" (Arcadia) in the mysteries . In the Mycenean Greek tablets dated 1400–1200 BC, the "two queens and the king" are mentioned. John Chadwick believes that these were the precursor divinities of Demeter, Persephone and Poseidon. (Note: "Wa-na-ssoi, wa-na-ka-te, (to the two queens and the king). Wanax is best suited to Poseidon, the special divinity of Pylos. The identity of the two divinities addressed as wanassoi, is uncertain".)

Some information can be obtained from the study of the cult of Eileithyia at Crete, and the cult of Despoina. In the cave of Amnisos at Crete, Eileithyia is related with the annual birth of the divine child and she is connected with Enesidaon (The earth shaker), who is the chthonic aspect of the god Poseidon. Persephone was conflated with Despoina, "the mistress", a chthonic divinity in West-Arcadia. The megaron of Eleusis is quite similar to the "megaron" of Despoina at Lycosura. Demeter is united with her, the god Poseidon, and she bears him a daughter, the unnameable Despoina. Poseidon appears as a horse, as usually happens in Northern European folklore. The goddess of nature and her companion survived in the Eleusinian cult, where the words "the mighty Potnia had born a strong son" were uttered. In Eleusis, in a ritual, one child ("pais") was initiated from the hearth. The name pais (the divine child) appears in the Mycenean inscriptions.

In Greek mythology Nysa is a mythical mountain with an unknown location. Nysion (or Mysion), the place of the abduction of Persephone was also probably a mythical place which did not exist on the map, a magically distant chthonic land of myth which was intended in the remote past.

=== Secret rituals and festivals ===
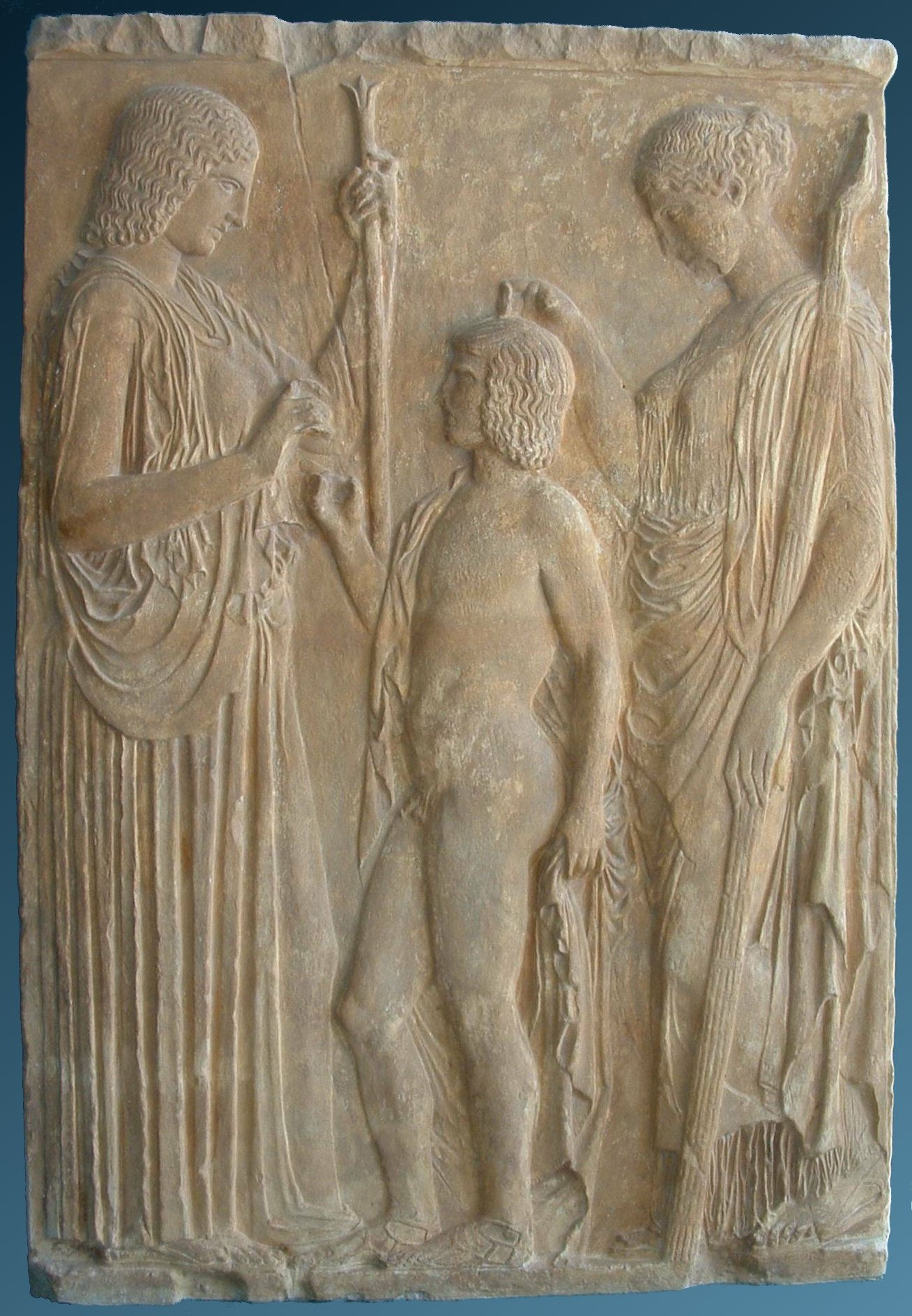
The Eleusinian trio: Persephone, Triptolemus and Demeter (Roman copy of the Great Eleusinian Relief hosted by the Metropolitan Museum of Art)

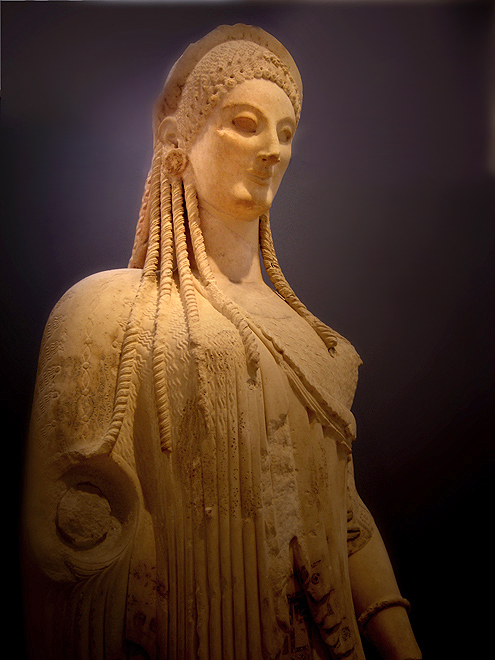
Kore, daughter of Demeter, celebrated with her mother by the Thesmophoriazusae (women of the festival). Acropolis Museum, Athens

Persephone and Demeter were intimately connected with the Thesmophoria, a widely-spread Greek festival of secret women-only rituals. These rituals, which were held in the month Pyanepsion, commemorated marriage and fertility, as well as the abduction and return of Persephone.

They were also involved in the Eleusinian Mysteries, a festival celebrated at the autumn sowing in the city of Eleusis. Inscriptions refer to "the Goddesses" accompanied by the agricultural god Triptolemos (probably son of Gaia and Oceanus), and "the God and the Goddess" (Persephone and Plouton) accompanied by Eubuleus who probably led the way back from the underworld.

=== In Rome ===
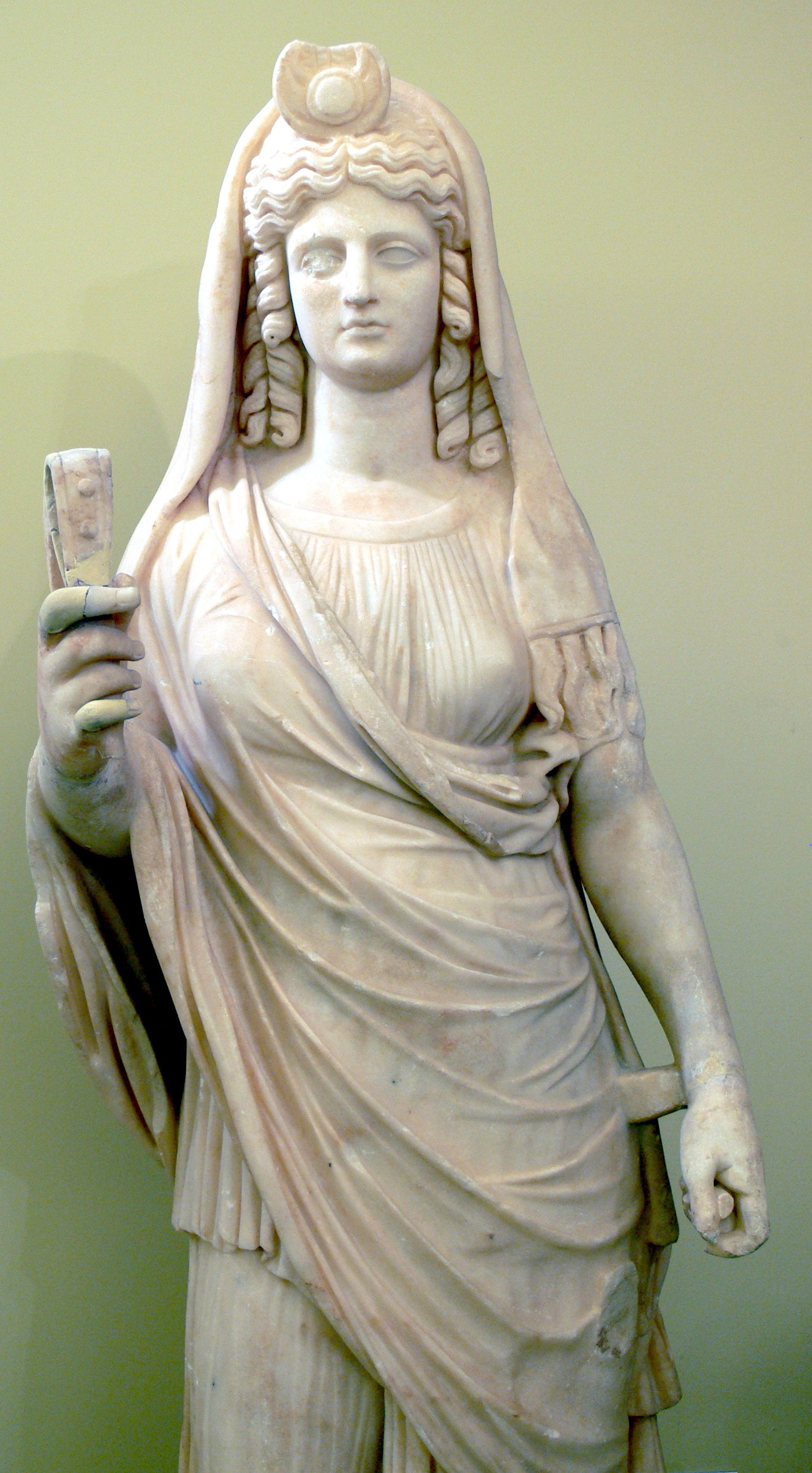
Syncretic Isis as Persephone, holding a sistrum, from the Sanctuary of the Egyptian gods at Gortyn, in Roman-era Crete. Heraklion Archaeological Museum, Crete

The Romans first heard of her from the Aeolian and Dorian cities of Magna Graecia, who used the dialectal variant Proserpinē (Προσερπίνη). Hence, in Roman mythology she was called Proserpina, a name erroneously derived by the Romans from proserpere, "to shoot forth" and as such became an emblematic figure of the Renaissance. In 205 BC, Rome officially identified Proserpina with the local Italic goddess Libera, who, along with Liber, were closely associated with the Roman grain goddess Ceres (considered equivalent to the Greek Demeter). The Roman author Gaius Julius Hyginus also considered Proserpina equivalent to the Cretan goddess Ariadne, who was the bride of Liber's Greek equivalent, Dionysus.

=== In Magna Graecia ===
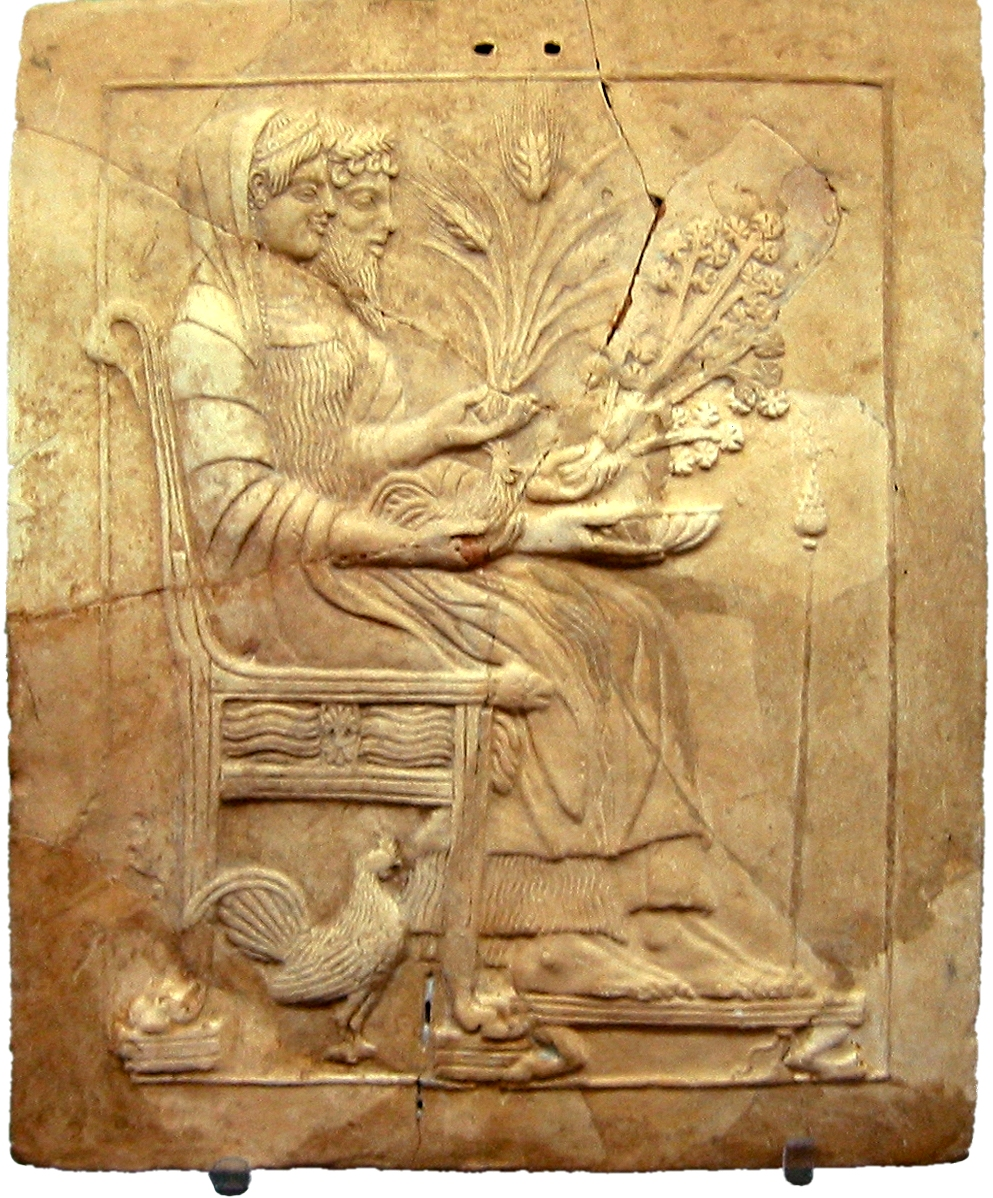
Pinax of Persephone and Hades from Epizephyrian Locris. Reggio Calabria, National Museum of Magna Graecia.

At Epizephyrian Locris, a city of Magna Graecia situated on the coast of the Ionian Sea in Calabria (a region of southern Italy), perhaps uniquely, Persephone was worshiped as protector of marriage and childbirth, a role usually assumed by Hera (in fact, Hera seems to have played no role in the public worship of the city); in the iconography of votive plaques at Epizephyrian Locris, her abduction and marriage to Hades served as an emblem of the marital state, children of the town were dedicated to Proserpina, and maidens about to be wed brought their peplos to be blessed. Diodorus Siculus knew the temple there as the most illustrious in Italy. During the 5th century BC, votive pinakes in terracotta were often dedicated as offerings to the goddess, made in series and painted with bright colors, animated by scenes connected to the myth of Persephone. Many of these pinakes are now on display in the National Museum of Magna Græcia in Reggio Calabria. Locrian pinakes represent one of the most significant categories of objects from Magna Graecia, both as documents of religious practice and as works of art.

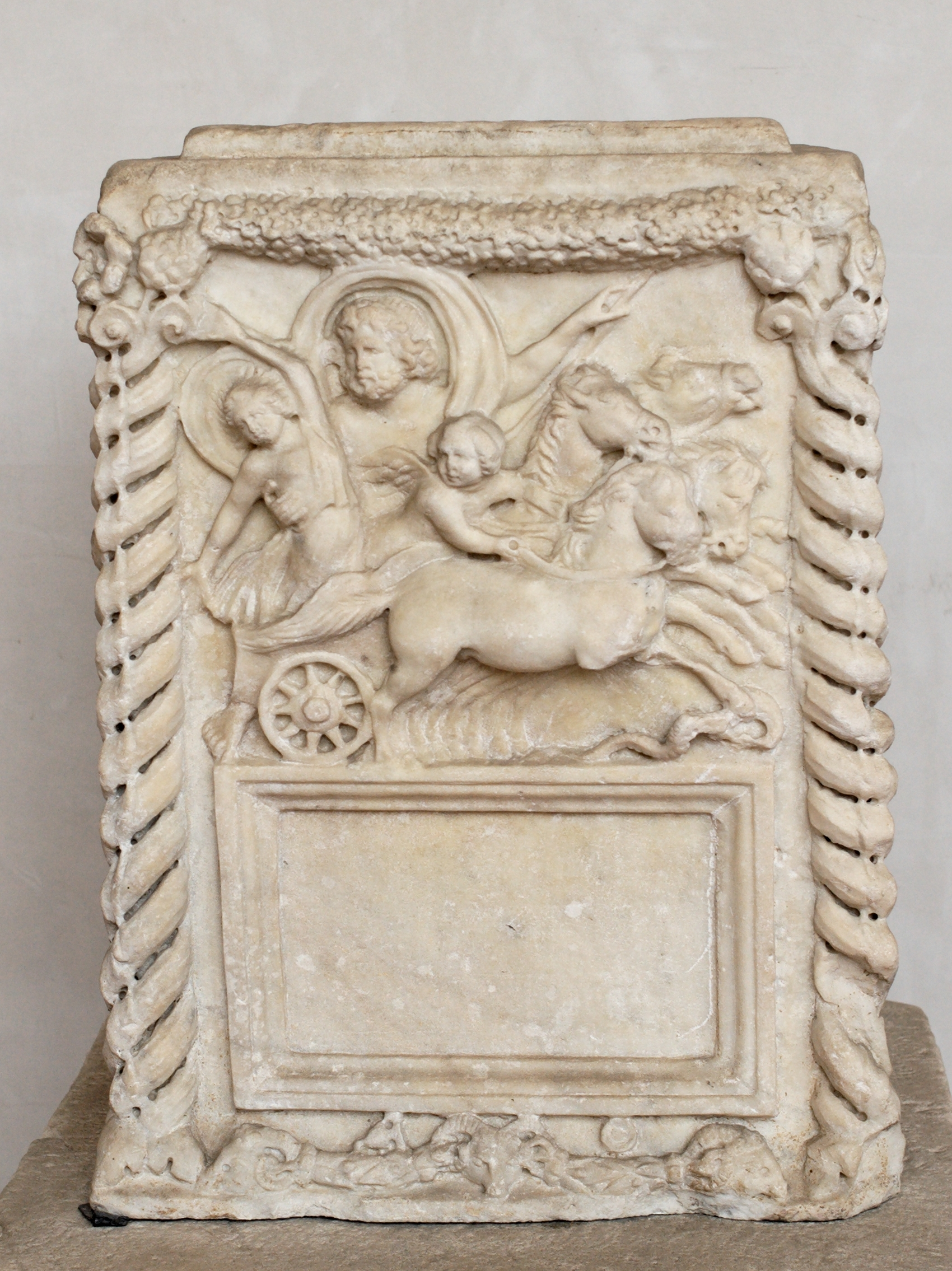
Cinerary altar with tabula representing the abduction of Proserpina. White marble, Antonine Era, 2nd century Rome, Baths of Diocletian

For most Greeks, the marriage of Persephone was a marriage with death, and could not serve as a role for human marriage; the Locrians, not fearing death, painted her destiny in a uniquely positive light. While the return of Persephone to the world above was crucial in Panhellenic tradition, in southern Italy Persephone apparently accepted her new role as queen of the underworld, of which she held extreme power, and perhaps did not return above; Virgil for example in Georgics writes that "Proserpina cares not to follow her mother", – though note that references to Proserpina serve as a warning, since the soil is only fertile when she is above it. Although her importance stems from her marriage to Hades, in Epizephyrian Locris she seems to have the supreme power over the land of the dead, and Hades is not mentioned in the Pelinna tablets found in the area. Many pinakes found in the cult near Epizephyrian Locris depict the abduction of Persephone by Hades, and others show her enthroned next to her beardless, youthful husband, indicating that in there Persephone's abduction was taken as a model of transition from girlhood to marriage for young women; a terrifying change, but one nonetheless that provides the bride with status and position in society. Those representations thus show both the terror of marriage and the triumph of the girl who transitions from bride to matron.

It had been suggested that Persephone's cult at Epizephyrian Locris was entirely independent from that of Demeter, who supposedly was not venerated there, but a sanctuary of Demeter Thesmophoros has been found in a different region of the colony, ruling against the notion that she was completely excluded from the Locrian pantheon.

The temple at Epizephyrian Locris was looted by Pyrrhus. The importance of the regionally powerful Epizephyrian Locrian Persephone influenced the representation of the goddess in Magna Graecia. Pinakes, terracotta tablets with brightly painted sculptural scenes in relief were founded in Locri. The scenes are related to the myth and cult of Persephone and other deities. They were produced in Locri during the first half of the 5th century BC and offered as votive dedications at the Locrian sanctuary of Persephone. More than 5,000, mostly fragmentary, pinakes are stored in the National Museum of Magna Græcia in Reggio Calabria and in the museum of Locri. Representations of myth and cult on the clay tablets (pinakes) dedicated to this goddess reveal not only a 'Chthonian Queen,' but also a deity concerned with the spheres of marriage and childbirth.

The Italian archaeologist Paolo Orsi, between 1908 and 1911, carried out a meticulous series of excavations and explorations in the area which allowed him to identify the site of the renowned Persephoneion, an ancient temple dedicated to Persephone in Calabria which Diodorus in his own time knew as the most illustrious in Italy.

The place where the ruins of the Sanctuary of Persephone were brought to light is located at the foot of the Mannella hill, near the walls (upstream side) of the polis of Epizephyrian Locris. Thanks to the finds that have been retrieved and to the studies carried on, it has been possible to date its use to a period between the 7th century BC and the 3rd century BC.

Archaeological finds suggest that worship of Demeter and Persephone was widespread in Sicily and Greek Italy.

=== In Orphism ===
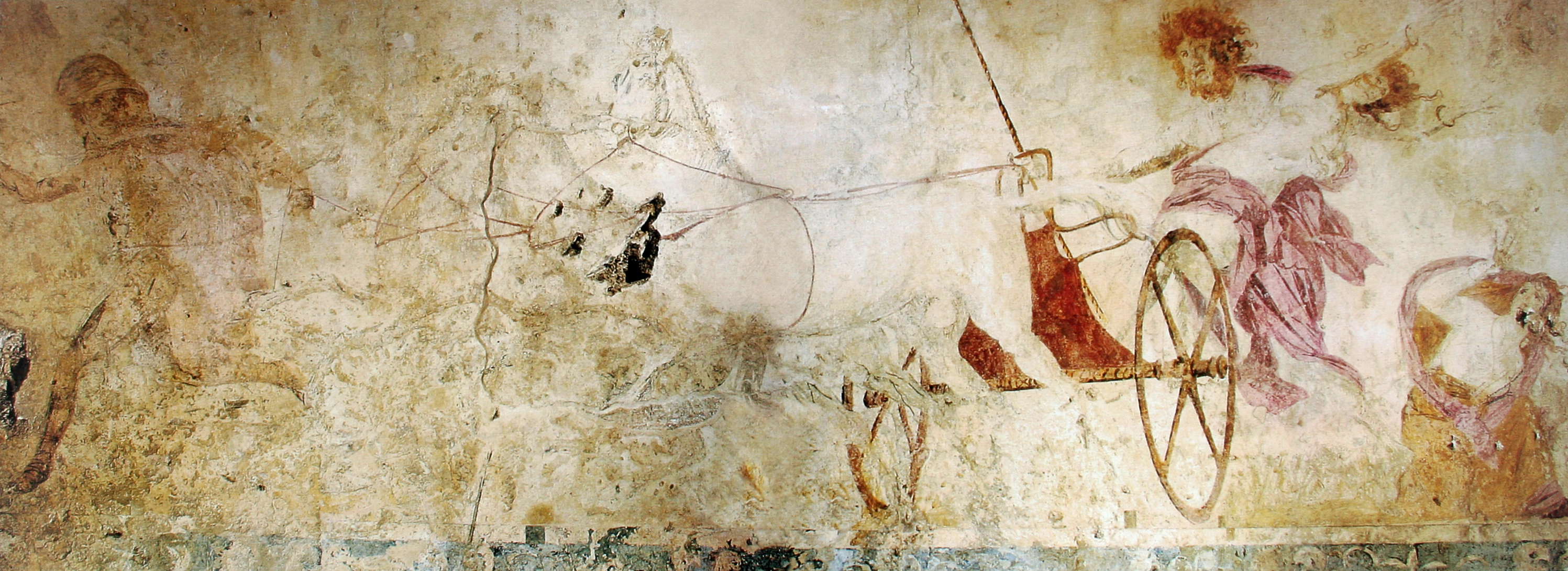
Hades abducting Persephone, wall painting in the small royal tomb at Vergina. Macedonia, Greece

Evidence from both the Orphic Hymns and the Orphic Gold Leaves demonstrate that Persephone was one of the most important deities worshiped in Orphism. In the Orphic religion, gold leaves with verses intended to help the deceased enter into an optimal afterlife were often buried with the dead. Persephone is mentioned frequently in these tablets, along with Demeter and Euklês, which may be another name for Plouton. The ideal afterlife destination believers strive for is described on some leaves as the "sacred meadows and groves of Persephone". Other gold leaves describe Persephone's role in receiving and sheltering the dead, in such lines as "I dived under the kolpos [portion of a Peplos folded over the belt] of the Lady, the Chthonian Queen", an image evocative of a child hiding under its mother's apron.

In Orphism, Persephone is believed to be the mother of the first Dionysus. In Orphic myth, Zeus came to Persephone in her bedchamber in the underworld and impregnated her with the child who would become his successor. The infant Dionysus was later dismembered by the Titans, before being reborn as the second Dionysus, who wandered the earth spreading his mystery cult before ascending to the heavens with his second mother, Semele. The first, "Orphic" Dionysus is sometimes referred to with the alternate name Zagreus (Ancient Greek: Ζαγρεύς). The earliest mentions of this name in literature describe him as a partner of Gaia and call him the highest god. The Greek poet Aeschylus considered Zagreus either an alternate name for Hades, or his son. Scholar Timothy Gantz noted that Hades was often considered an alternate, chthonic form of Zeus, and suggested that it is likely Zagreus was originally the son of Hades and Persephone, who was later merged with the Orphic Dionysus, the son of Zeus and Persephone, owing to the identification of the two fathers as the same being. However, no known Orphic sources use the name "Zagreus" to refer to Dionysus. It is possible that the association between the two was known by the 3rd century BC, when the poet Callimachus may have written about it in a now-lost source. In the Orphic Hymns, the Eumenides are daughters of Persephone and Hades. Whereas Melinoë was conceived as the result of rape when Zeus disguised himself as Hades in order to mate with Persephone, the Eumenides' origin is unclear.

=== Other local cults ===
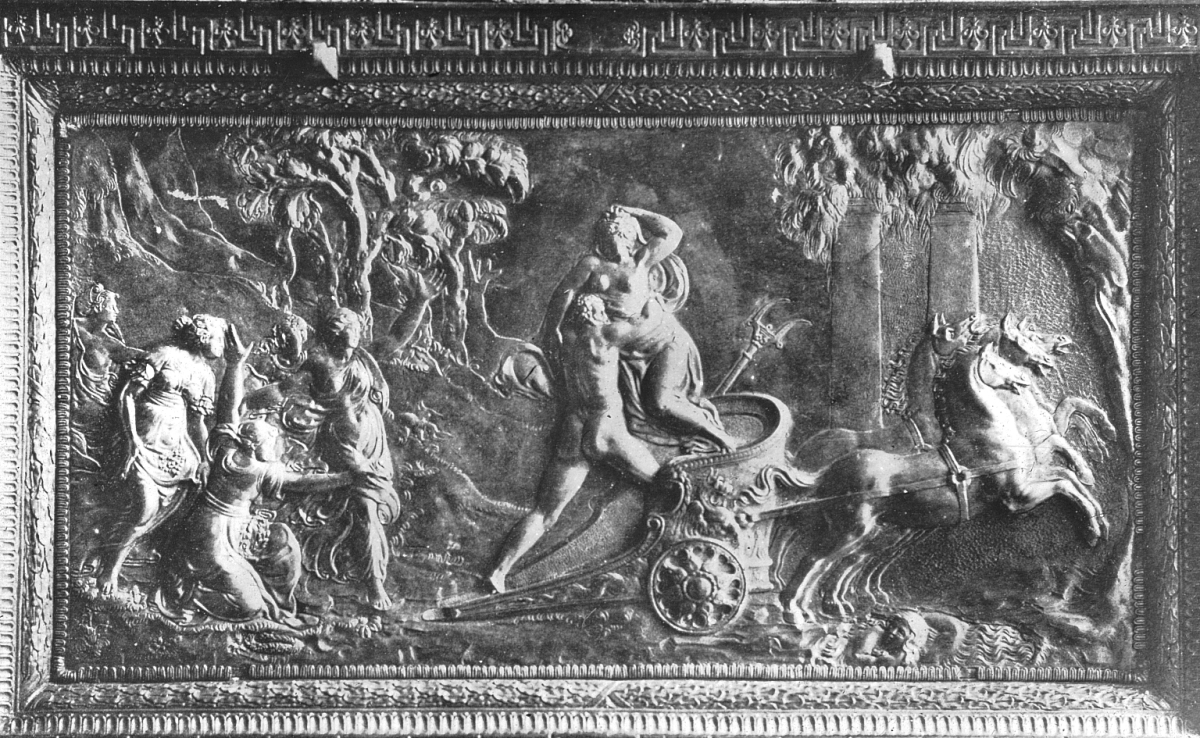
Italy. Renaissance relief, Rape of Persephone. Brooklyn Museum Archives, Goodyear Archival Collection

There were local cults of Demeter and Kore in Greece, Asia Minor, Sicily, Magna Graecia, and Libya.

Attica

- Athens, in the mysteries of Agrae. This was a local cult near the river Ilissos. They were celebrated during spring in the month Anthesterion. Later they became an obligation for the participants of the "greater" Eleusinian Mysteries. There was a temple of Demeter and Kore and an image of Triptolemos.
  Demeter drives her horse-drawn chariot containing her daughter Persephone at Selinunte, Sicily 6th century BC
- Piraeus: The Skirophoria, a festival related to the Thesmophoria.
- Megara: Cult of Demeter thesmophoros and Kore. The city was named after its megara .
- Aegina: Cult of Demeter thesmophoros and Kore.
- Phlya: near Koropi. The local mystery religion may have been originally dedicated to Demeter, Kore, and Zeus Ktesios; Pausanias mentions a temple to all three there. It seems that the mysteries were related to the mysteries of Andania in Messene.

Boeotia

- Thebes: purportedly granted to her by Zeus in return for a favor. As well, the cults of Demeter and Kore in a feast named Thesmophoria but probably different. It was celebrated in the summer month Bukatios.
- A feast in Boeotia, in the month Demetrios (Pyanepsion), probably similar to the Thesmophoria.

Peloponnese (except Arcadia)

- Hermione: An old cult of Demeter Chthonia, Kore, and Klymenos (Hades). Cows were pushed into the temple, and then they were killed by four women. It is possible that Hermione was a mythical name, the place of the souls.
- Asine: Cult of Demeter Chthonia. The cult seems to be related to the original cult of Demeter in Hermione.
- Lakonia: Temple of Demeter Eleusinia near Taygetos. The feast was named Eleuhinia, and the name was given before the relation of Demeter with the cult of Eleusis.
- Lakonia at Aigila: Dedicated to Demeter. Men were excluded.
- near Sparta: Cult of Demeter and Kore, the Demeters (Δαμάτερες, "Damaters"). According to Hesychius, the feast lasted three days (Thesmophoria).
- Corinth: Cult of Demeter, Kore, and Pluton.
- Triphylia in Elis: Cult of Demeter, Kore, and Hades.

Arcadia

- Pheneos: Mysteries of Demeter Thesmia and Demeter Eleusinia. The Eleusinian cult was introduced later.
- Pallantion near Tripoli: Cult of Demeter and Kore.
- Karyai: Cult of Kore and Pluton.
- Tegea: Cult of Demeter and Kore, the Karpophoroi, "Fruit givers".
- Megalopolis: Cult of the Great goddesses, Demeter and Kore Sotira, "the savior".
- Mantineia: Cult of Demeter and Kore in the fest Koragia.
- Trapezus: Mysteries of the Great goddesses, Demeter and Kore. The temple was built near a spring, and a fire was burning out of the earth.

Islands

- Paros: Cult of Demeter, Kore, and Zeus-Eubuleus.
- Amorgos: Cult of Demeter, Kore, and Zeus-Eubuleus.
- Delos: Cult of Demeter, Kore, and Zeus-Eubuleus. Probably a different feast with the name Thesmophoria, celebrated in a summer month (the same month in Thebes). Two big loaves of bread were offered to the two goddesses. Another feast was named Megalartia.
- Mykonos: Cult of Demeter, Kore, and Zeus-Buleus.
- Crete : Cult of Demeter and Kore, in the month Thesmophorios.
- Rhodes: Cult of Demeter and Kore, in the month Thesmophorios. The two goddesses are the Damaters in an inscription from Lindos

Egypt

- Alexandria: According to Epiphanius, a temple of Kore existed in Alexandria. He describes a celebration of the birth of Aion from Kore the Virgin which took place there on 6 January. Aion may be a form of Dionysus, reborn annually; an inscription from Eleusis also identifies Aion as a son of Kore.

Asia Minor

- Knidos: Cult of Demeter, Kore, and Pluton. Agrarian magic similar to the one used in Thesmophoria and in the cult of the potniai (Cabeirian).
- Ephesos: Cult of Demeter and Kore, celebrated at night-time.
- Priene: Cult of Demeter and Kore, similar to the Thesmophoria.

Sicily

- Syracuse: There was a harvest festival of Demeter and Persephone at Syracuse when the grain was ripe (about May).
- A fest Koris katagogi, the descent of Persephone into the underworld.

Libya

- Cyrene: Temple of Demeter and Kore

== Modern reception ==
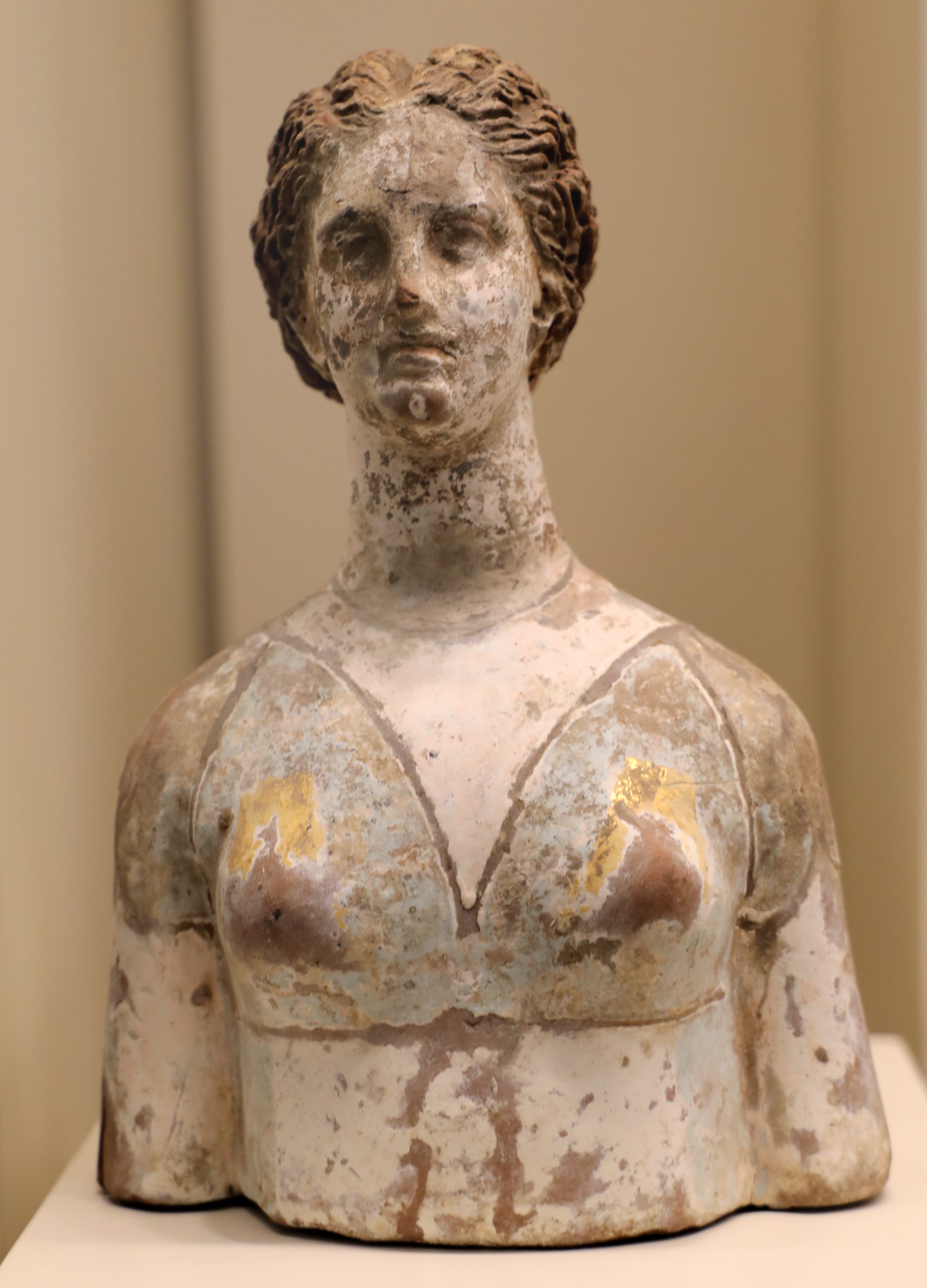
Small Ptolemaic terracotta bust of Persephone, National Archaeological Museum of Athens, Greece.

Persephone also appears many times in popular culture. Modern retellings of the myth sometimes depict Persephone as at first unhappy with Hades abducting her, but eventually coming to appreciate her role as his queen after he began to treat her with respect, though she occasionally engages in affairs with mortals.

== See also ==
- Anthesphoria, festival honoring Proserpina, and Persephone
- Eleusinian Mysteries
- Demeter
- Despoina
- Rape of Persephone
- Sporus

== Bibliography ==
Classical sources

- Aelian (1959) [2nd century CE]. De Natura Animalium [On Animals]. Loeb Classical Library No. 449. Vol. III: books 12–17. Translated by Scholfield, A.F. Cambridge, MA: Harvard University Press. ISBN 978-0-674-99494-2. Archived from the original on 18 October 2021.
- Aeschylus (1926) [5th century BCE]. "Fragments". Aeschylus, with an English translation. Vol. II. Translated by Smyth, H.W. London: Heinemann.
- Apollodorus (1921) [1st century CE]. Bibliotheca [The Library]. Translated by Frazer, J. Cambridge, MA: Harvard University Press. Archived from the original on 25 February 2021.
- Homer (1924) [8th century BC]. The Iliad. Translated by Murray, A.T. Cambridge, MA: Harvard University Press.
- Homer (1871) [8th century BC]. The Odyssey. Oxford: Clarendon Press.
- Gaius Julius Hyginus. Grant, Mary (ed.). Astronomica from the Myths of Hyginus. Translated by Grant, Mary. University of Kansas Publications in Humanistic Studies. Archived from the original on 15 August 2021.
- Antoninus Liberalis (1992) [2nd to 3rd century CE]. The Metamorphoses of Antoninus Liberalis. Translated by Celoria, Francis. Routledge. Archived from the original on 2 October 2018.
- Lucian (1905) [2nd century CE]. Dialogues of the Gods. Translated by Fowler, H.W.; Fowler, F.G. Oxford: The Clarendon Press.
- Oppian; Colluthus; Tryphiodorus (1928) [1st to 5th centuries CE]. "Halieutica". Oppian, Colluthus, and Tryphiodorus. Loeb Classical Library 219. Translated by Mair, A.W. Cambridge, MA: Harvard University Press. Archived from the original on 24 September 2021.
- Ovid (1922) [8 CE]. Metamorphoses. Translated by More, Brookes. Boston: Cornhill Publishing Co. Archived from the original on 29 October 2021.
- Pausanias (1918) [2nd century CE]. Helládos Periḗgēsis [Description of Greece]. Translated by Jones, W.H.S.; Ormerod, H.A. Cambridge, MA: Harvard University Press.
- Strabo (1924) [1st century CE]. Jones, H.L. (ed.). The Geography of Strabo. Cambridge, MA: Harvard University Press. Archived from the original on 15 April 2014.
- Theognis (1931) [6th century BCE]. Elegy and Iambu with an English Translation by J.M. Edmonds. Translated by Edmonds, J.M. Cambridge, MA: Harvard University Press. Archived from the original on 26 September 2021.
- Diodorus Siculus (1888–1890) [c. 56 BCE]. Bekker, Immanel; Dindorf, Ludwig; Vogel, Friedrich (eds.). Bibliotheca Historica (in Ancient Greek). Vol. 1–2. Leipzig: aedibus B.G. Teubneri. Archived from the original on 13 May 2021.

Contemporary sources

- Athanassakis, Apostolos N.; Wolkow, Benjamin M. (29 May 2013). The Orphic Hymns. Johns Hopkins University Press. ISBN 978-1-4214-0882-8. Archived from the original on 10 February 2023.
- Aurora, Frederico. "PY 316 Tn (44)". DĀMOS: Database of Mycenaean at Oslo. University of Oslo. Archived from the original on 14 March 2014.
- Beekes, R.S.P. (2009). Etymological Dictionary of Greek. Vol. 2. Brill. pp. 1179–80. ISBN 9789004174184.
- Bennett, Michael J.; Paul, Aaron J.; Iozzo, Mario; White, Bruce (2002). Magna Graecia: Greek Art from South Italy and Sicily. The Cleveland Museum of Art. ISBN 0-940717-71-9.
- Bell, Robert E. (1991). Women of Classical Mythology: A Biographical Dictionary. ABC-CLIO. ISBN 0-87436-581-3.
- Bowra, M. (1957). The Greek Experience. Cleveland: The World Publishing Company.
- Bremmer, Jan N. (2020). The World of Greek Religion and Mythology:Collected Essays II. Mohr Siebeck. ISBN 9783161544514. Archived from the original on 10 February 2023.
- Bremmer, Jan N (2013). "Divinities in the Orphic Gold Leaves: Euklês, Eubouleus, Brimo, Kybele, Kore and Persephone". Zeitschrift für Papyrologie und Epigraphik. 187: 35–48. JSTOR 23850747.
- Burkert, Walter (1985). Greek Religion. Harvard University Press. ISBN 0-674-36281-0.
- Chadwick, John (1959). Documents in Mycenean Greek (2nd ed.). OCLC 1357633622.
- Chadwick, John (1976). The Mycenaean World. Cambridge, UK: Cambridge University Press. ISBN 0-521-29037-6. Archived from the original on 10 February 2023. At Google Books.
- Edmonds III, Radcliffe G. (2013). Redefining Ancient Orphism: A Study in Greek Religion. Cambridge University Press. ISBN 978-1-107-03821-9.
- Edmonds III, Radcliffe G. (2011). "Orphic Mythology". In Dowden, Ken; Livingstone, Niall (eds.). A Companion to Greek Mythology (1st ed.). Blackwell Publishing Ltd. ISBN 9781405111782.
- Edmonds III, Radcliffe G. (2004). Myths of the Underworld Journey: Plato, Aristophanes, and the 'Orphic' Gold Tablets. Cambridge University Press. ISBN 0-52183434-1.
- Evelyn-White, H.G. (1914). "Homeric Hymn to Demeter (2)". The Homeric Hymns and Homerica with an English Translation by Hugh G. Evelyn-White. Cambridge, MA: Harvard University Press. Archived from the original on 9 August 2020.
- Farnell, Lewis Richard (1906). "Demeter and Kore-Persephone; Cult-monuments of Demeter-Kore; Ideal types of Demeter-Kore". The Cults of the Greek States. Vol. 3.
- Fossum, Jarl (August 1999). "The Myth of the Eternal Rebirth: Critical Notes on G. W. Bowersock, Hellenism in Late Antiquity". Vigiliae Christianae. 53 (3): 305–315. doi:10.2307/1584594. JSTOR 1584594.
- Gantz, T. (1996). Early Greek Myth: A guide to literary and artistic sources. Johns Hopkins University Press. In two volumes: ISBN 978-0-8018-5360-9 (Vol. 1), ISBN 978-0-8018-5362-3 (Vol. 2).
- Grimal, Pierre (1996). The Dictionary of Classical Mythology. Wiley-Blackwell. ISBN 978-0-631-20102-1.
- Hard, Robin (2004). The Routledge Handbook of Greek Mythology: Based on H.J. Rose's "Handbook of Greek Mythology". Psychology Press. ISBN 978-0-415-18636-0.
- Heslin, Peter (2018). Propertius, Greek Myth, and Virgil: Rivalry, allegory, and polemic. Oxford, Oxford University Press. ISBN 978-0-199-54157-7. Archived from the original on 10 February 2023.
- Janda, Michael (2010). Die Musik nach dem Chaos. Innsbruck: Innsbrucker Beiträge zur Kulturwissenschaft.
- J. Paul Getty Museum (1983). Greek Vases in the J. Paul Getty Museum. Vol. 1. Malibu, California: Getty Publications. ISBN 0-89236-058-5. Archived from the original on 8 February 2023.
- Kerenyi, K (1967). Eleusis: Archetypal image of mother and daughter. Princeton University Press.
- Kerenyi, K. (1976). Dionysos: Archetypal Image of Indestructible Life. Princeton: Bollingen. ISBN 0-691-02915-6. Archived from the original on 10 February 2023.
- Kern, O. (1922). Orphicorum Fragmenta. Berlin: Berolini Apud Weidmannos.
- Kingsley, Peter (1995). Ancient Philosophy, Mystery, and Magic: Empedocles and Pythagorean Tradition. Oxford University Press.
- Kourouniōtēs, Kōnstantinos; Mylonas, George (1932). Eleusiniaka. OCLC 10084499.
- Kramer, Samuel Noah (1961). Sumerian Mythology: A Study of Spiritual and Literary Achievement in the Third Millennium B.C. (Revised ed.). Philadelphia: University of Pennsylvania Press. ISBN 978-1605060491. Archived from the original on 12 October 2014.
- Lincoln, Bruce (1979). "The Rape of Persephone: A Greek Scenario of Women's Initiation". The Harvard Theological Review. 72 (3/4): 223–235. doi:10.1017/S0017816000020034. ISSN 0017-8160. JSTOR 1509722. S2CID 161724658.
- Linforth, Ivan (1941). The arts of Orpheus. Berkeley: University of California Press. OCLC 3101754. Archived from the original on 25 January 2021.
- Meisner, Dwayne A. (2018). Orphic Tradition and the Birth of the Gods. Oxford University Press. ISBN 978-0-19-066352-0.
- Mylonas, George (1966). Mycenae and the Mycenean age. Princeton University Press. ISBN 9780691035239.
- Parker, Robert (2011). On Greek Religion. Cornell University Press. ISBN 978-0-8014-4948-2.
- Miles, Gary B. (1980). Virgil's Georgics: A New Interpretation. University of California Press. ISBN 0-520-03789-8. Archived from the original on 10 February 2023.
- Nilsson, Martin (1967). Die Geschichte der Griechischen Religion. Vol. I (Revised ed.). Muenchen, DE: C.F Beck Verlag.
- Nilsson, M. (1950). Minoan-Mycenaean Religion, and its Survival in Greek Religion (2nd ed.). Lund: Gleerup.
- Nilsson, Martin (1940). "Greek Popular Religion". Archived from the original on 21 August 2021.
- Paton, W.R. (1916). The Greek Anthology with an English Translation. London: William Heinemann Ltd. 1. Archived from the original on 15 June 2021.
- Raymoure, K.A. "pe-re-*82". Minoan Linear A & Mycenaean Linear B. Deaditerranean. Archived from the original on 21 March 2016.
- Richter, Gisela M. A. (October 1931). "An Athenian Vase with the Return of Persephone". The Metropolitan Museum of Art Bulletin. Vol. 26, no. 10. pp. 245–248.
- Rohde, E. (1961) [1893]. Psyche. Seelenkult und Unsterblichkeitsglaube der Griechen (in German). Darmstad: Wissenschaftliche Buchgesellshaft.
- Rohde, E. (2000) [1925]. Psyche: The Cult of Souls and the Belief in Immortality among the Greeks. Translated by Hillis, W. B. London: Routledge. ISBN 978-0-415-22563-2.
- Schachermeyr, F. (1964). Die Minoische Kultur des alten Kreta. Stuttgart: W.Kohlhammer Verlag.
- Smith, W. (1873). Dictionary of Greek and Roman Biography and Mythology. London: Spottiswoode and Co. Archived from the original on 8 March 2021.
- Spaeth, Barbette Stanley (1996). The Roman goddess Ceres. University of Texas Press. ISBN 978-0-292-77693-7.
- Tripp, Edward (June 1970). Crowell's Handbook of Classical Mythology (first ed.). Thomas Y. Crowell Co. ISBN 069022608X.
- Welch, Anthony (2013). The Renaissance Epic and the Oral Past. Yale University Press. ISBN 978-0300178869.
- West, M.L. (1983). The Orphic Poems. Oxford: Clarendon Press. ISBN 978-0-19-814854-8.
- Wiseman, T. P. (1988). "Satyrs in Rome? The Background to Horace's Ars Poetica". The Journal of Roman Studies. 78: 1–13. doi:10.2307/301447. JSTOR 301447.
- Zuntz, G. (1973). Persephone: Three essays on religion and thought in Magna Graecia.
