= Orphic Tradition and the Birth of the Gods =

2018 book about Orphic literature

Orphic Tradition and the Birth of the Gods is a 2018 book about Orphic literature by the classicist Dwayne Meisner. It discusses the Orphic theogonies, now-lost works attributed in antiquity to the mythical poet Orpheus about the origins and genealogies of the gods. In his treatment of the Derveni Theogony, Meisner considers its ritual context and remains neutral in the debate over what it described Zeus as swallowing. He avoids attempting to consolidate the evidence for the Eudemian Theogony into a single narrative, and he addresses the ways that the Hieronyman Theogony was used by subsequent authors. In the two chapters devoted to the Orphic Rhapsodies, he places evidence from later authors in context and engages with the idea that the work may have been a compilation of smaller poems. He believes that the so-called "Zagreus myth" was not as central to the Rhapsodies as Zeus's supremacy and his swallowing of the god Phanes.

Meisner perceives the Orphic theogonies as works of bricolage, constructed by individual authors from available mythic elements. This concept had been applied to Orphic evidence by several prior scholars, and contrasts with the methodology of Martin Litchfield West's 1983 book about Orphic theogonies. Other aspects of Meisner's approach are his avoidance of aligning himself with one side in debates, his belief that the Orphic theogonies were brief as opposed to wide-ranging, and his emphasis on Near Eastern influence. The book has been positively received by some scholars, having been described as erudite and thorough.

== Background ==
Orphic Tradition and the Birth of the Gods was published in 2018 by Oxford University Press. It is a revised version of the author's doctoral thesis, which is titled "Zeus the Head, Zeus the Middle": Studies in the History and Interpretation of the Orphic Theogonies. Meisner writes that he first became familiar with Orphic scholarship while working on his master's thesis, on the topic of the Dionysian mysteries.

The book is about the Orphic theogonies, which are now-lost works of Orphic literature, the tradition of texts attributed in antiquity to the mythical poet Orpheus. (Note: On Orphic literature, see Parker, p. 483.) Similarly to the Theogony by the 8th- or 7th-century BC poet Hesiod, these theogonies concerned the origins and genealogies of the gods. The fragments assigned to the Orphic theogonies constitute the largest portion of the evidence for the lost works of Orphic literature. From these fragments, four theogonies are typically reconstituted: the Derveni Theogony, the work commented on in the Derveni papyrus (which dates to the 4th century BC); the 5th-century BC Eudemian Theogony; the Hieronyman Theogony, associated with writers named Hieronymus and Hellanicus; and the Rhapsodies, dating to around the 1st century BC or AD. (Note: Herrero de Jáuregui, p. 502. For this information about the dates of the works, see Meisner 2018, p. 1.)

== Summary ==
In the book's first chapter, Meisner introduces the scholarly debate over the nature of Orphism and discusses the theogonic genre. (Note: Furlan, p. 367. For Meisner's discussion, see Meisner 2018, pp. 1–33.) He outlines the main elements of his approach to the evidence, including the notion that the theogonies are products of bricolage. (Note: Herrero de Jáuregui, p. 503. For a discussion of bricolage and other elements of Meisner's approach throughout his book, see § Approach.) In the second chapter, Meisner discusses the Derveni Theogony and supplies a reconstruction of its contents. Meisner explores how the work pertained to ritual, and addresses the focal role attributed to Zeus, also discussing the deities Phanes and Night. He remains deliberately agnostic as to whether Zeus was said to swallow Phanes or the genitals of the god Uranus, which is a matter of heated debate in Orphic scholarship. (Note: Kotwick, p. 104. Betegh, p. 112 writes that there is "intense disagreement" over the question of what Zeus was said to swallow. For a discussion of this debate, see Betegh, pp. 111–121.) Meisner's third chapter approaches the evidence assigned to the Eudemian Theogony as belonging to various Orphic theogonies from around its time. (Note: Furlan, pp. 367–368. For Meisner's discussion of this, see Meisner 2018, pp. 100–101.) He avoids attempting to synthesize this evidence into a coherent narrative, and considers it best to avoid presuming anything about the Eudemian Theogony beyond its attribution to the philosopher Eudemus of Rhodes and the primordial role it ascribed to Night. In the book's fourth chapter, devoted to the Hieronyman Theogony, Meisner analyses how the work was employed by the Christian author Athenagoras and the Neoplatonist philosopher Damascius, who are extant sources for its contents. (Note: Furlan, p. 368. For Meisner's discussion of the way these two authors used the text, see Meisner 2018, pp. 122–127.)

The fifth and sixth chapters of Meisner's book focus on the Orphic Rhapsodies. He discusses the work's cosmogonic deities and the influence of Near Eastern traditions, and he situates fragments of the work from later authors (including the Neoplatonist philosophers) in their respective contexts. (Note: Herrero de Jáuregui, p. 503. For this analysis as including the Neoplatonists, see Kotwick, p. 105.) Meisner also considers the theory, proposed by Radcliffe Edmonds in his 2013 book Redefining Ancient Orphism, that the Rhapsodies were a compilation of various smaller poems. (Note: Kotwick, pp. 104–105. For Edmonds' proposal as to the nature of the Rhapsodies, see Edmonds, pp. 148–159.) He lays out the most important pieces of evidence for the so-called "Zagreus myth", a story about the dismemberment of the young Dionysus by the Titans, which appeared in the Rhapsodies and has been viewed as the central myth of Orphism. Meisner discusses various modern scholarly perspectives on the myth, remaining neutral in doing so. (Note: Furlan, p. 368. For a reconstruction of the full myth, see Graf & Johnston, p. 67. For this story as having appeared in the Rhapsodies, see Meisner 2018, p. 239. On the Zagreus myth as having been perceived as the central myth of Orphism, see Parker, p. 495.) He does not see the dismemberment myth as the centrepiece of the Rhapsodies, considering it auxiliary to the establishment of Zeus's pre-eminence, which comes about through the god's swallowing of Phanes; in Meisner's view, Zeus – rather than Dionysus – was the most important figure of the Rhapsodies.

== Approach ==
Meisner approaches the evidence for the Orphic theogonies through the lens of bricolage, a concept derived from the writings of the anthropologist Claude Lévi-Strauss. He thus views the works as creations of individual bricoleurs, whom he defines as "an anonymous author who drew from the elements of myth that were available at the time, and reconfigured these elements", with the resultant Orphic literary tradition being "varied and fluid". Meisner is not the first scholar to apply the notion of bricolage to Orphic evidence: it was employed in Fritz Graf and Sarah Iles Johnston's analysis of the "Orphic" gold tablets in their 2007 book Ritual Texts for the Afterlife: Orpheus and the Bacchic Gold Tablets, and in Edmonds' discussion of the Orphic Rhapsodies in his Redefining Ancient Orphism. (Note: Kotwick, p. 104. For example, see Graf & Johnston, p. 94 and Edmonds, p. 149.) According to Mirjam E. Kotwick, Meisner's study is a response to The Orphic Poems, a 1983 monograph by Martin Litchfield West about the Orphic theogonies which sought to fit them together into a stemma; Meisner repudiates West's method in favour of viewing the texts through the lens of bricolage. (Note: Kotwick, p. 104. For West's book as attempting to place the Orphic theogonies into a stemma, see Janko, p. 155.)

Meisner takes the view that Orphic theogonies were brief poems similar to the Homeric Hymns, as opposed to lengthy and wide-ranging works akin to Hesiod's Theogony. He also believes that they were most likely employed in ritual, and is attentive to the interplay between philosophy and the Orphic theogonic tradition. He emphasises the influence of Near Eastern traditions on the Orphic theogonies, viewing their bricoleur authors as having incorporated these elements into the Greek theogonic genre, which was exemplified by Hesiod's Theogony.

Meisner tries to remain neutral in the debate over Orphism: he rarely aligns himself with one side in debates, instead laying out the views of different scholars. He does not attempt to precisely define Orphism, although he does propound a tripartite grouping of Orphic evidence: telestic Orphism encompasses the varied and fragmented texts (as well as rituals) from an early period; literary Orphism includes the more sophiscated and reflective poems that first emerged in the Hellenistic period (c. 323–30 BC); and interpretative Orphism comprises the – mostly allegorical – interpretations of Orphic poems produced as late as the Christian apologists.

== Reception ==
Luc Brisson writes that Meisner's book is "impeccable from the viewpoint of erudition", and Kotwick describes its analysis as "diligent and thorough". Miguel Herrero de Jáuregui calls it a "splendidly equipped tool" for those traversing the evidence and scholarship of the Orphic theogonies, and he characterises Meisner's bipartisan approach to debates as a "skilful way of avoiding fossilized controversies blocking any progress". Kotwick comments that his cautious modus operandi limits the number of new hypotheses he is able to make, and she notes that although he refrains from taking a side in the debate over what Zeus swallows in the Derveni Theogony, at several later points he appears to assume that it is Uranus's genitals. (Note: Kotwick, p. 104. An example is at Meisner 2018, pp. 210–211.) Herrero de Jáuregui comments that Meisner's belief in the importance of Zeus within the Rhapsodies implies that it had certain parts that were central, and that his view that the consumption of Dionysus (as part of the dismemberment myth) and the swallowing of Phanes are parallel presumes some degree of continuity across parts of the work. (Note: Herrero de Jáuregui, p. 503. He adds that ancient authors state merely that the Titans "try" Dionysus's flesh.) In Anna Lucia Furlan's view, one of the book's most valuable contributions is its methodology of elucidating how "later interpretations can inform our own reading of Orphic texts".
