= Günther Zuntz =

German-born classical philologist (1902–1992)

Günther Zuntz (28 January 1902 – 3 April 1992), German-English classical philologist, professor of Hellenistic Greek and Bible scholar.

== Life and career ==
He obtained a D.Phil. from the University of Marburg in 1928 and was later a professor at the University of Manchester.

Zuntz was born in Berlin in 1902. In 1933 he emigrated to England, because of racial persecutions.

== Scholarship ==
In 1971, Zuntz published his Persephone, which contained an edition of the Gold Tablets with commentary. The initial set of tablets was discovered in the late 19th century by Domenico Comparetti, who believed they belonged to an "Orphic and Bacchic" mystery cult. Zuntz, whose work was published in a period of relative scepticism in Orphic studies, argued against Comparetti's interpretation, instead viewing the texts as Pythagorean. His edition contained several new tablets which had been discovered since Comparetti's time: three from near Eleutherna in Crete, and one from Pharsalos in Thessaly. (Note: Graf & Johnston, p. 61. For the contents of these tablets, see Graf & Johnston, pp. 22–25, 34–35.) Zuntz also introduced a division of the tablets into two groups, which he labelled A and B. The A tablets all derive from Thurii, Italy, and contain requests to gods of the underworld for release from repeated reincarnation, while the B group contains all of the remaining tablets.

Zuntz examined the Greek text of the Pauline epistles.

== Publications ==
- Zuntz G. (1953). The Text of the Epistles. London: Wipf & Stock Publishers. ISBN 978-1-55635-372-7.
- Zuntz, G. Persephone: Three Essays on Religion and Thought in Magna Graecia. Oxford: Clarendon Press, 1971. Internet Archive.
