= Totenpass =

"Passport of the dead" in some ancient religions

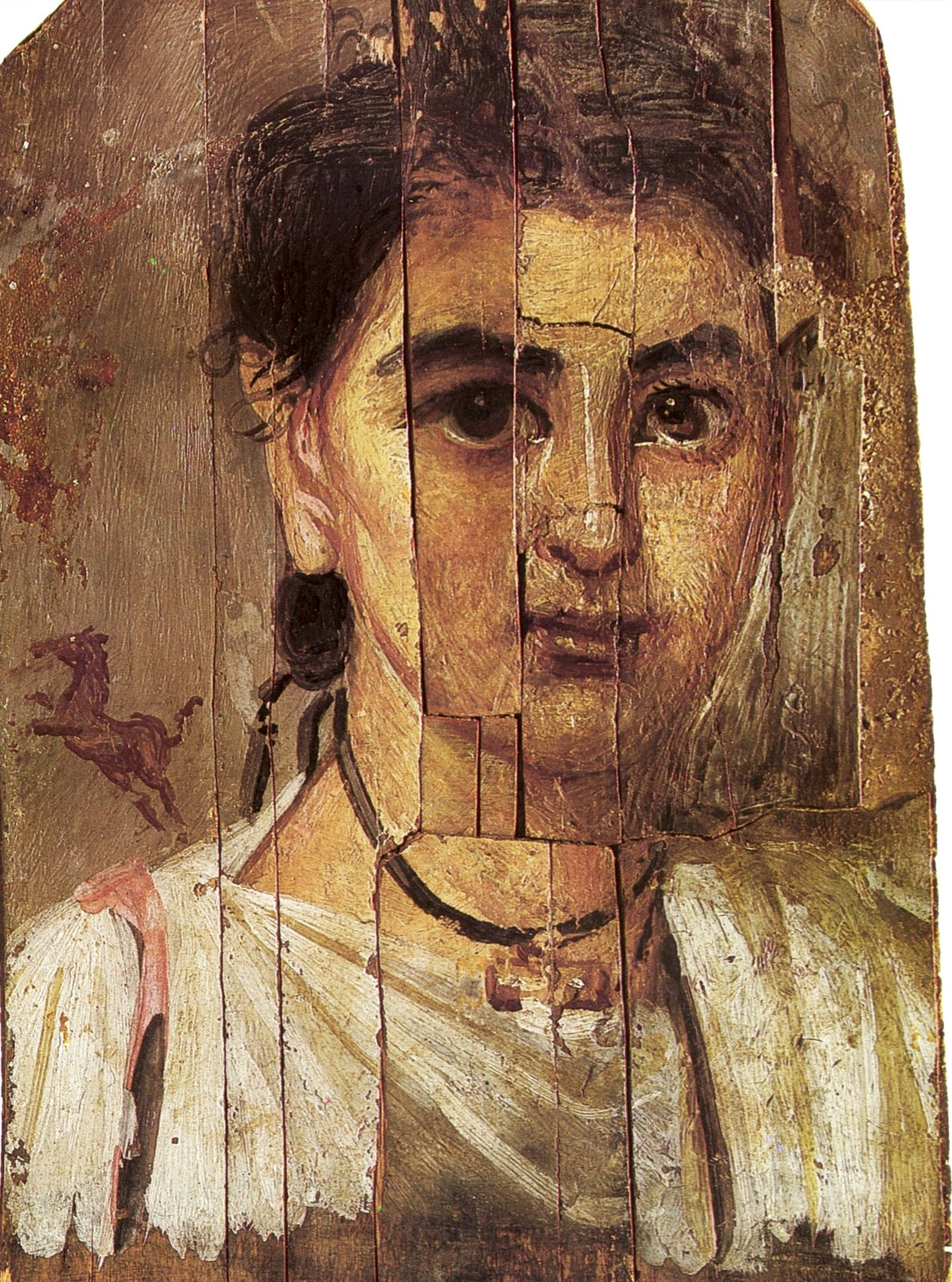
A Totenpass in the form of an inscribed metal leaf was sometimes rolled up and inserted into a necklace capsule, as shown in this 2nd-century funerary portrait from Egypt.

Totenpass (plural Totenpässe) is a German term sometimes used for inscribed tablets or metal leaves (lamellae) found in burials primarily of those presumed to be initiates into Orphic, Dionysiac, and some ancient Egyptian and Semitic religions. The term may be understood in English as a "passport for the dead". The so-called Orphic gold tablets are perhaps the best-known example.

Totenpässe are placed on or near the body as a phylactery, or rolled and inserted into a capsule often worn around the neck as an amulet. The inscription instructs the initiate on how to navigate the afterlife, including directions for avoiding hazards in the landscape of the dead and formulaic responses to the underworld judges.

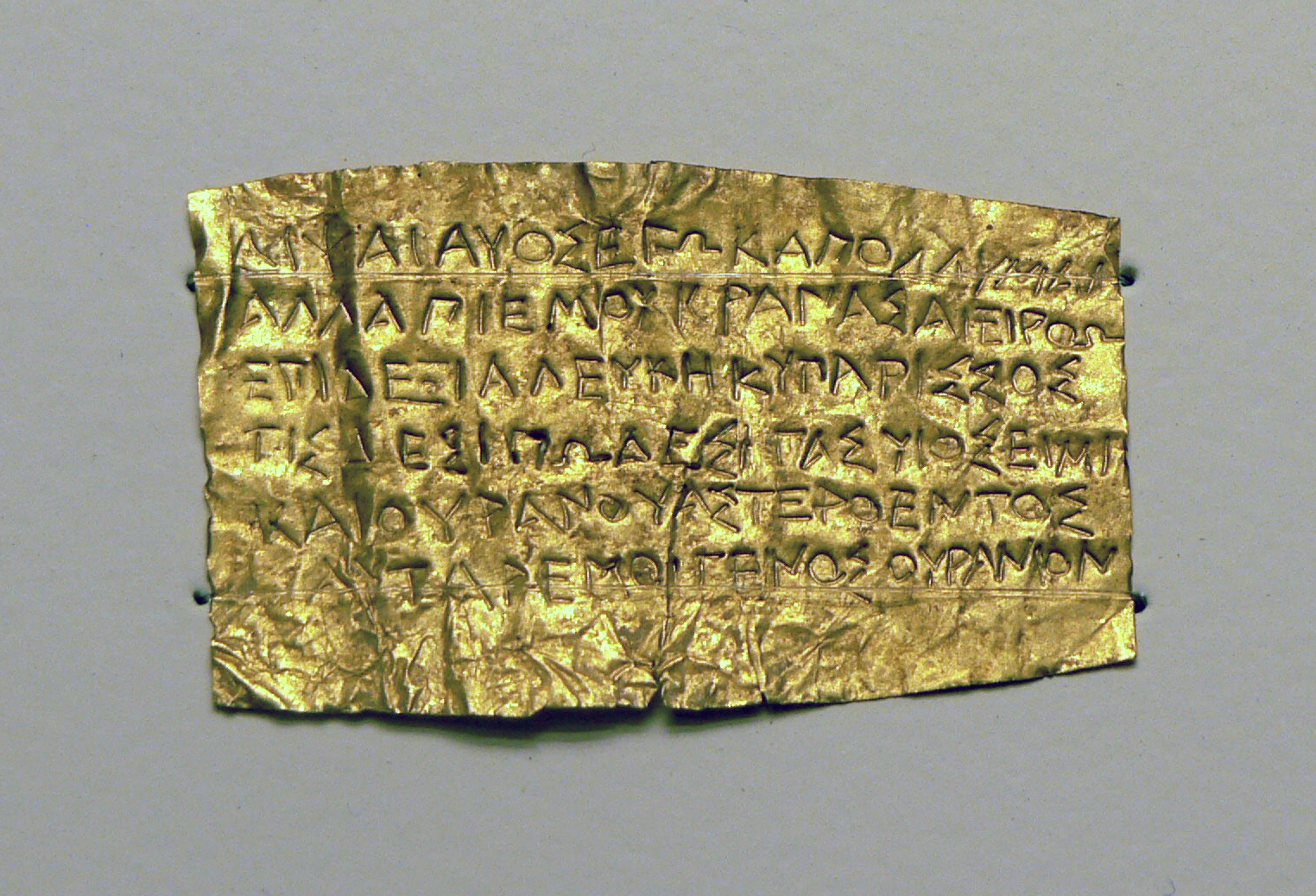
4th century BC gold orphic tablet from the Getty Museum, Los Angeles

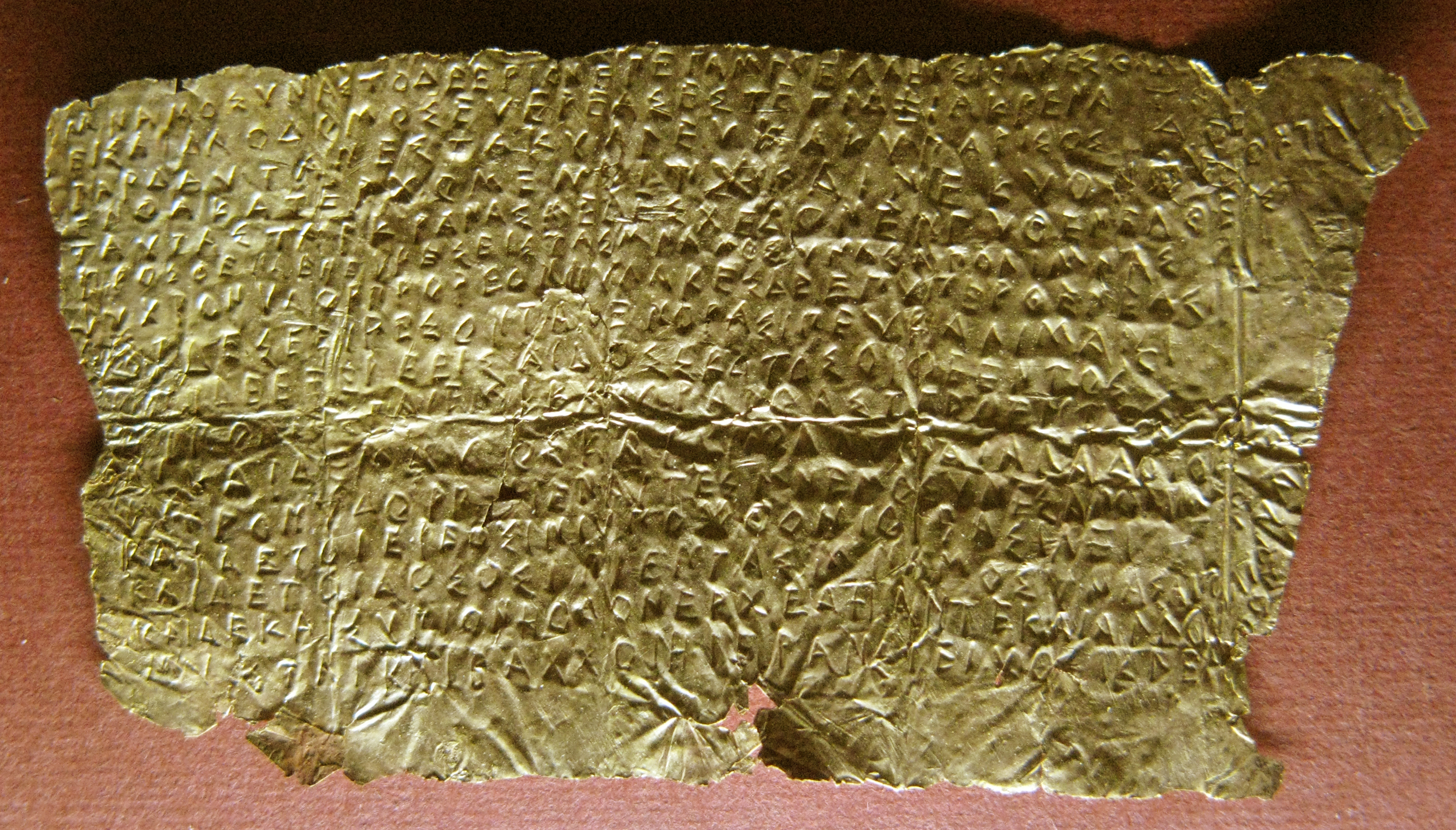
Gold lamella from Hipponion, unrolled

== Examples ==
The Getty Museum owns an outstanding example of a 4th-century BC Orphic prayer sheet from Thessaly, a gold-leaf rectangle measuring about 26 by 38 mm (1.0 by 1.5 in). The burial site of a woman also in Thessaly and dating to the late 4th century BC yielded a pair of Totenpässe in the form of lamellae (Latin, "thin metal sheets", singular lamella). Although the term "leaf" to describe metal foil is a modern metaphorical usage, these lamellae were in this case cut in the shape of cordate leaves probably meant to represent ivy; most Totenpässe of this type are rectangular. The Greek lettering is not inscribed in regular lines as it is on the rectangular tablets, but rambles to fit the shape. The leaves are paper-thin and small, one measuring 40 by 31 mm (1.6 by 1.2 in) and the other 35 by 30 mm (1.4 by 1.2 in). They had been arranged symmetrically on the woman's chest, with her lips sealed by a gold danake, or "Charon's obol", the coin that pays the ferryman of the dead for passage; this particular coin depicted the head of a Gorgon. Also placed in the tomb was a terracotta figurine of a maenad, one of the ecstatic women in the retinue of Dionysus.

Although the meandering and fragile text poses difficulties, the inscriptions appear to speak of the unity of life and death and of rebirth, possibly in divine form. The deceased is supposed to stand before Persephone, Queen of the Dead, and assert "I have been released by Bacchios himself."

Totenpässe have also been found in tombs from Palestine dating from the 2nd century BC and later. These tiny gold sheets employ a formulaic consolation that appears regularly on funerary steles in the area: θάρσει, (here the name of the deceased is inserted), οὐδεὶς ἀθάνατος ("Take courage, [name], no one is immortal"). In one instance, the inscribed tablet was shaped like a funerary headband, with holes to bind it around the forehead.

== Interpretation ==
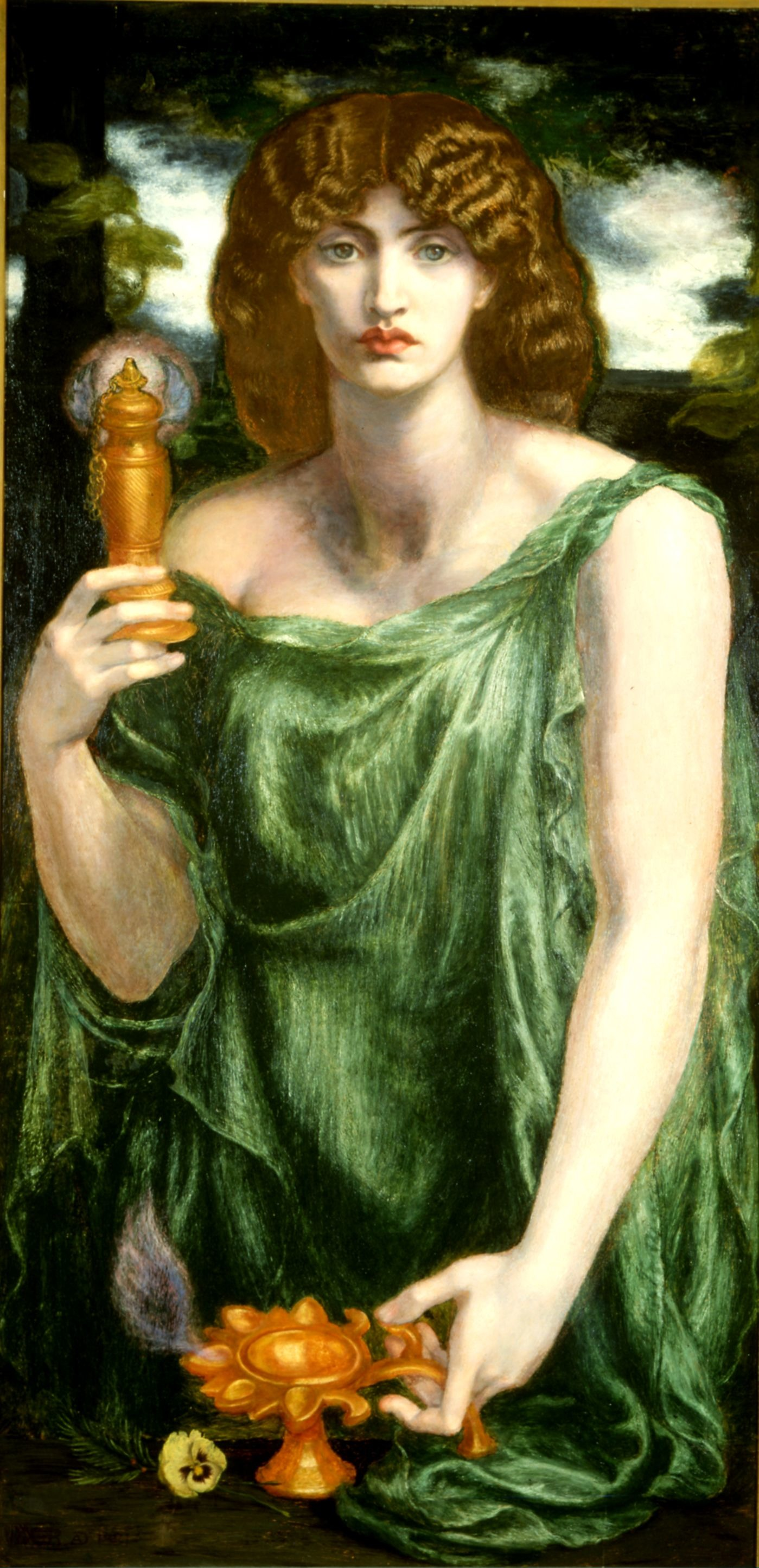
Mnemosyne (1881), a pre-Raphaelite interpretation of the goddess of memory by Dante Gabriel Rossetti

Günther Zuntz made the most complete survey of gold tablets discovered up to 1971 (at Thurii, Crete, and elsewhere), categorizing them into three groups that have become the typological standard. Zuntz presented transcribed text coupled with a reconstruction, and interpreted their religious foundation as Pythagorean rather than Orphic. Philologist Richard Janko proposed that Group B from Zuntz's collection derived from a single archetype, for which he offered a hypothetical Greek text and the following English translation while attempting, he emphasized, not to rely on preconceptions about underlying theology:

You will find on the right in Hades' halls a spring, and by it stands a ghostly cypress-tree, where the dead souls descending wash away their lives. Do not even draw nigh this spring. Further on you will find chill water flowing from the pool of Memory: over this stand guardians. They will ask you with keen mind what is your quest in the gloom of deadly Hades. They will ask you for what reason you have come. Tell them the whole truth straight out. Say: 'I am the son of Earth and starry Heaven, but of Heaven is my birth: this you know yourselves. I am parched with thirst and perishing: give me quickly chill water flowing from the pool of Memory.' Assuredly the kings of the underworld take pity on you, and will themselves give you water from the spring divine; then you, when you have drunk, traverse the holy path which other initiates and bacchants tread in glory. After that you will rule amongst the other heroes.

The most widely available source that discusses the Orphic gold tablets is the classic (if largely superseded) Orpheus and Greek Religion by W. K. C. Guthrie. In the first decade of the 2000s, some scholars questioned the usefulness of the term "Orphic" as well as the unity of religious belief underlying the gold tablets; others defended the association of the tablets with Orphism.

Scholarly interpretation has so far been divided between two readings of the texts. Christian Zgoll proposed a synthesis of these views through a Doppelspiegelszenario ("double-mirror scenario"). He understands the tablets as primarily relating to the initation into the mystery cults of Dionysus and Orpheus, with the afterlife being a secondary concern. According to Zgoll, ritual initiation into the mysteries anticipates actual death, while at the same time reflecting expectations about the initiate's later arrival in the afterlife. Thus, ritual death in the initiation ceremony and physical death at the end of life form an inseparable unity that can hardly be distinguished from one another.

The gold leaves also suggest the purpose of these texts: at the centre of initiation was the apotheosis of the initiates during their own lifetime. In this sense, the Totenpässe function similarly to modern passports, providing evidence that the deceased has been initiated, has thereby already become a god, and was therefore granted entry into the netherworld.

== See also ==
- Dionysian Mysteries
- Cult of Dionysus
