= Viaticum =

Last Communion, received near death

Viaticum is a term used – especially in the Catholic Church – for the Eucharist (also called Holy Communion), administered, with or without Anointing of the Sick (also called Extreme Unction), to a person who is dying; viaticum is thus a part of the Last Rites.

== Origins ==
The word viaticum is a Latin word meaning "provision for a journey", from via, or "way". Alternatively, viaticum can refer to an ancient Roman provision or allowance for traveling, originally of transportation and supplies, later of money, made to officials on public missions; mostly simply, the word, a haplology of viā tēcum ("with you on the way"), indicates money or necessities for any journey. Viaticum can also refer to the enlistment bonus received by a Roman legionary, auxiliary soldier or seaman in the Roman Imperial Navy.

== Practice ==
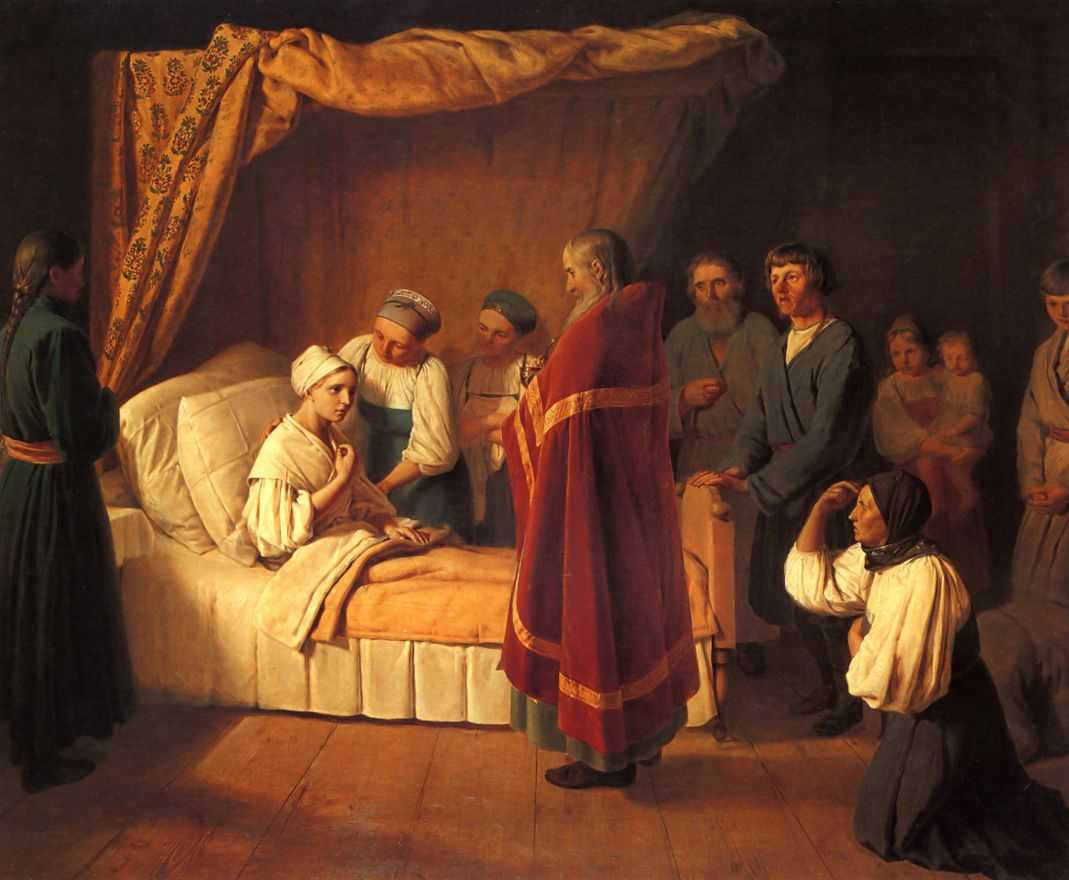
Administration of the (Eastern Orthodox) Eucharist to a dying woman (1839 painting by artist Alexey Venetsianov)

For Communion as Viaticum, the Eucharist is given in its usual form, with the added words "May the Lord Jesus Christ protect you and lead you to eternal life". The Eucharist is seen as the ideal spiritual food to strengthen a dying person for the journey from this world to life after death. The desire to have the bread and wine consecrated in the Eucharist available for the sick and dying led to the reservation of the Blessed Sacrament, a practice which has endured from the earliest days of the Christian Church. Saint Justin Martyr, writing less than fifty years after the death of Saint John the Apostle, mentions that "the deacons communicate each of those present, and carry away to the absent the consecrated Bread, and wine and water".

If the dying person cannot take solid food, the Eucharist may be administered via the wine alone, since the Catholic Church holds that Christ exists in his entirety (body, blood, soul, and divinity) in both the consecrated solid and liquid elements.

The sacrament of Extreme Unction is often administered immediately before giving Viaticum if a priest is available to do so. Unlike the Anointing of the Sick, Viaticum may be administered by a priest, deacon or by an extraordinary minister, using the reserved Blessed Sacrament. The rite prescribed by the Second Vatican Council provides for a continuous action in which the sick person is anointed after their confession and before they receive viaticum.

In Late Antiquity and the Early Mediaeval period in the West, the host was sometimes placed in the mouth of a person already dead. Some claim that this could relate to a traditional practice which scholars have compared to the pre-Christian custom of Charon's obol, a small coin placed in the mouth of the dead for passage to the afterlife and sometimes also called a viaticum in Latin literary sources.

== Bibliography ==
- Rubin, Miri, Corpus Christi: The Eucharist in Late Medieval Culture, Cambridge: Cambridge University Press, 1991.
- Snoek, C. J. K., Medieval Piety from Relics to the Eucharist: A Process of Mutual Interaction, Leiden: Brill, 1995.
