= Anointing of the sick in the Catholic Church =

Sacrament of the Catholic Church

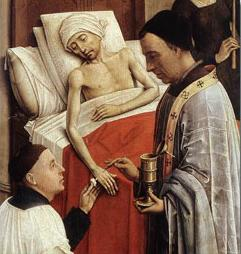
"Extreme unction", part of The Seven Sacraments (1445–1450) by Rogier van der Weyden

In the Catholic Church, the anointing of the sick, also known as extreme unction, is a Catholic sacrament that is administered to a Catholic "who, having reached the age of reason, begins to be in danger due to sickness or old age", except in the case of those who "persevere obstinately in manifest grave sin". Proximate danger of death, the occasion for the administration of Viaticum, is not required, but only the onset of a medical condition of serious illness or injury or simply old age: "It is not a sacrament for those only who are at the point of death. Hence, as soon as anyone of the faithful begins to be in danger of death from sickness or old age, the fitting time for him to receive this sacrament has certainly already arrived."

Despite that position, anointing of the sick has in practice often been postponed until someone is near dying, in spite of the fact that in all celebrations of this sacrament, the liturgy prays for recovery of the health of the sick person if that would be conducive to their salvation. In the past, it became increasingly administered only to the dying and so came to be called extreme unction (final anointing).

The sacrament is administered by a bishop or priest, who uses the oleum infirmorum ('oil of the sick'), an olive oil or another pure plant oil blessed by a bishop, to anoint the patient's forehead and perhaps other parts of the body while reciting certain prayers. According to Catholic doctrine, the sacrament is intended to give comfort, peace, courage and, if the sick person is unable to make a confession, even forgiveness of sins.

== Introduction ==
=== Sacramental graces ===
The Catholic Church sees the effects of this sacrament as follows: As the Sacrament of Holy Matrimony gives grace for the married state, the Sacrament of Anointing of the sick gives grace for the state into which people enter through sickness. Through the sacrament, a gift of the Holy Spirit is given, that renews confidence and faith in God and strengthens against temptations to discouragement, despair and anguish at the thought of death and the struggle of death; it prevents the believer from losing Christian hope in God's justice, truth and salvation. Since one of the effects of this sacrament is to absolve the recipient of any sins not previously absolved through the Sacrament of Penance, only a validly ordained priest or bishop may administer this sacrament.

"The special grace of the sacrament of the Anointing of the sick has as its effects:

- the uniting of the sick person to the passion of Christ, for his own good and that of the whole Church;
- the strengthening, peace, and courage to endure in a Christian manner the sufferings of illness or old age;
- the forgiveness of sins, if the sick person was not able to obtain it through the sacrament of penance;
- the restoration of health, if it is conducive to the salvation of his soul;
- the preparation for passing over to eternal life."

An extensive account on Church teachings about the Anointing of the sick is in the Catechism of the Catholic Church, 1499–1532.

=== Biblical references ===
The chief biblical text concerning Anointing of the sick is James 5:14–15: "Is any man sick among you? Let him bring in the priests of the church and let them pray over him, anointing him with oil in the name of the Lord. And the prayer of faith shall save the sick man. And the Lord shall raise him up: and if he be in sins, they shall be forgiven him." Matthew 10:8, Luke 10:8–9 and Mark 6:13 are also quoted in this regard.

=== Names for the sacrament ===
The usual name of the sacrament in official Church documents was formerly extreme unction (meaning “final anointing”), implying it was administered only to those near death. Peter Lombard (died 1160) is the first writer known to have used the term, which did not become common in Western Christianity until near the end of the 12th century, and never became current in Eastern Christianity. The word extreme (with the sense of “final”) indicated either it was the last of the sacramental unctions (after the anointings at Baptism, Confirmation and, if received, Holy Orders) or because at that time it was normally administered only when a patient was in extremis (near death).

The Second Vatican Council called for the title "anointing of the sick" to be used in place of "extreme unction": the preferred term was considered "more fitting" because anointing is "not a sacrament for those only who are at the point of death". The official name was therefore changed to Anointing of the sick to reflect Church teaching that the sacrament is to be conferred on those who are "dangerously ill".

Throughout the years, the sacrament has also been known in Western Christianity by various other names, including the holy oil or unction of the sick; the unction or blessing of consecrated oil; the unction of God; and the office of the unction. In Eastern Christianity, it is technically known as euchelaion (i.e., prayer-oil); other names used include: elaion hagion (holy oil), hegismenon elaion (consecrated oil), elaiou chrisis (anointing with oil), and chrisma (anointing).

== Administration ==
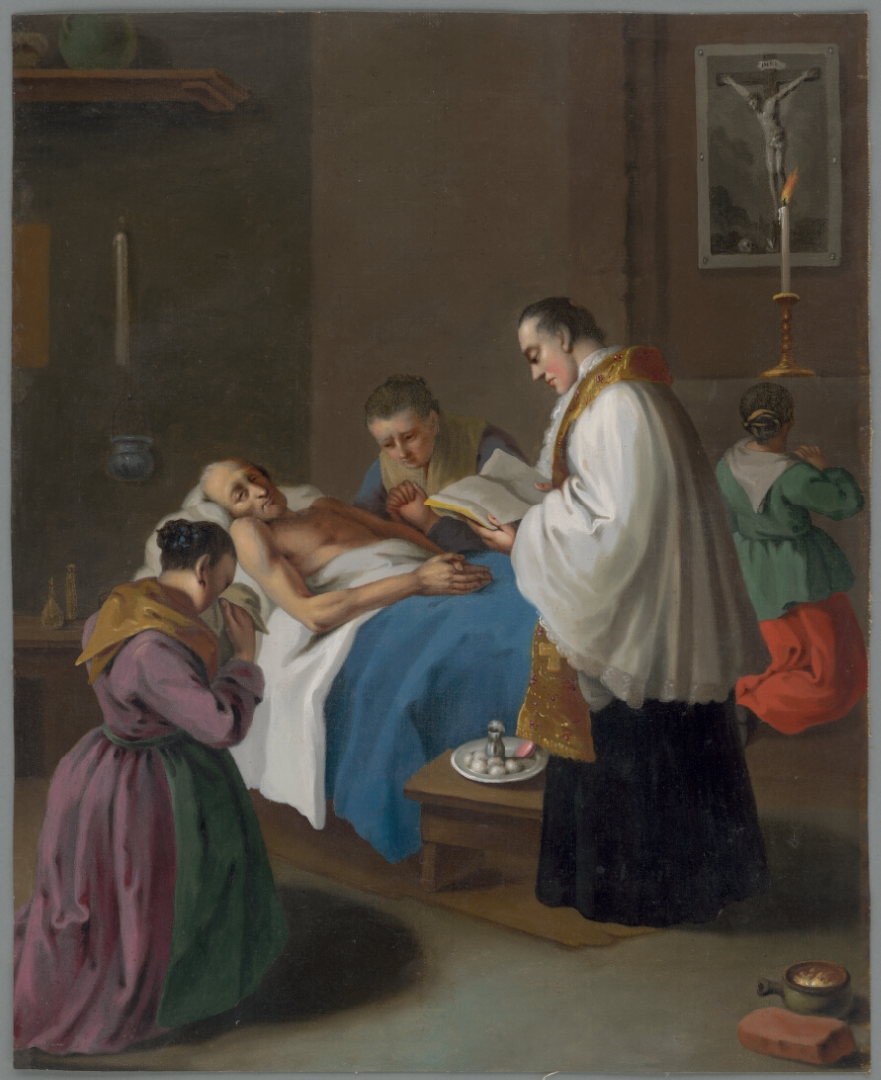
Last rites, a set of sacraments, being given to a dying man

Catholic canon law specifies those who may receive the sacrament: "The anointing of the sick can be administered to a member of the faithful who, having reached the use of reason, begins to be in danger due to sickness or old age." If a new illness develops or the first illness relapses or worsens, the patient may receive the sacrament a further time. A priest may, on the basis of his pastoral judgment, administer the sacrament numerous times in cases of old age or chronic illness. Like any sacrament, Anointing of the sick can be given only to someone alive; however, as the precise moment of death is not known or defined with precision, someone may be validly anointed during a brief period after having been declared clinically dead.

The sacrament of anointing can be administered to an individual whether at home, in a hospital or care institution, or in a church. Several sick persons may be anointed within the rite, especially if the celebration takes place in a church or hospital. The celebration may also take place during a Catholic Mass.

=== Relationship with the "last rites" ===
When administered to those near to death, the sacraments of penance, Anointing of the sick and Viaticum (Holy Communion administered the dying) are collectively sometimes called the last rites.

What in the judgment of the Catholic Church are properly described as the last rites are Viaticum, and the ritual prayers of Commendation of the Dying, and Prayers for the Dead.

The normal order of administration of these three sacraments to the dying is: confession (if the dying person is physically unable to confess, the absolution is given conditionally on the existence of contrition), then anointing, and finally Viaticum.

Only a priest or bishop can administer the sacraments of reconciliation and anointing of the sick, but a deacon or layperson may deliver and administer Holy Communion as "Viaticum, the Last Sacrament of the Christian".

=== Established form ===
The oil used in the sacrament is usually olive oil, though other oils may also be used. It is often from stock blessed by a diocesan bishop at the Chrism Mass he celebrates, often on the morning of Holy Thursday or another day close to it. In case of necessity, the priest administering the sacrament may bless the oil then and there within the framework of the rite.

In the Roman Rite of the Latin Church, as established through the papal document Sacram unctionem infirmorum of 1972, has the priest anoints the sick person's forehead and hands with oil (usually tracing the form of a cross). The formula is as follows: "Through this holy anointing, may the Lord in his love and mercy help you with the grace of the Holy Spirit. May the Lord who frees you from sin save you and raise you up." He may also, in accordance with local culture and traditions, and the needs of the sick person, anoint other parts of the body, but without repeating the required sacramental formula.

The previous form used in the Roman Rite included anointing seven parts of the body, while saying (in Latin): "Through this holy anointing, may the Lord pardon you whatever sins/faults you have committed by... ." The sense in question was then mentioned: sight, hearing, smell, taste, touch, walking, and carnal delectation. Touching of the loins was generally omitted in English-speaking countries unless a male believers consented; it was forbidden in general so to do on female believers.

== Eastern Catholic churches ==
In a number of the 23 Eastern Catholic Churches, the sacrament (or "sacred mystery") of Anointing the Sick is administered using various liturgies, often identical with forms used by Eastern Orthodox churches not in communion with Rome. Adaptation or development of liturgical forms in the Eastern Catholic Churches is overseen by the Congregation for the Oriental Churches, which is part of the Roman Curia.

== See also ==
- Anointing of the sick
- Votive Mass

== Bibliography ==
- de Launoy, Jean (1673). De sacramento unctionis infirmorum liber (in French). Paris: Typis viduæ Edmundi Martini.
- Trombelli, Giovanni Crisostomo (1778). Tractatus de sacramentis per polemicas et liturgicas dissertationes distributi. De extrema unctione (in Latin). Bologna: Typographia Sancti Thomæ Aquinatis.
- Bellarmine, Robert (1847). "The sixteenth precept, on the sacrament of Extreme Unction" . The Art of Dying Well. Translated by John Dalton. Richardson and Son.
- Chavasse, Antoine (1942). Étude sur l'onction des infirmes dans l'Église latine du IIIe au XIe siècle (in French). Lyon: Librairie du Sacré-Coeur.
- Council of Trent (1829). "Part II: On Extreme Unction" . The catechism of the Council of Trent. Translated by James Donovan. Lucas Brothers.
- Didier, Jean-Charles (1960). Le Chrétien devant la maladie et la mort (in French). Paris: A. Fayard.
- Poschmann, Bernhard SJ (1963). Penance and the Anointing of the Sick. The Herder History of Dogma. Translated by Fr. Courtney SJ (transl. from German). Freiburg - London: Herder - Burns & Oates. p. 257.
