= Arcy-Sainte-Restitue =

- Commune
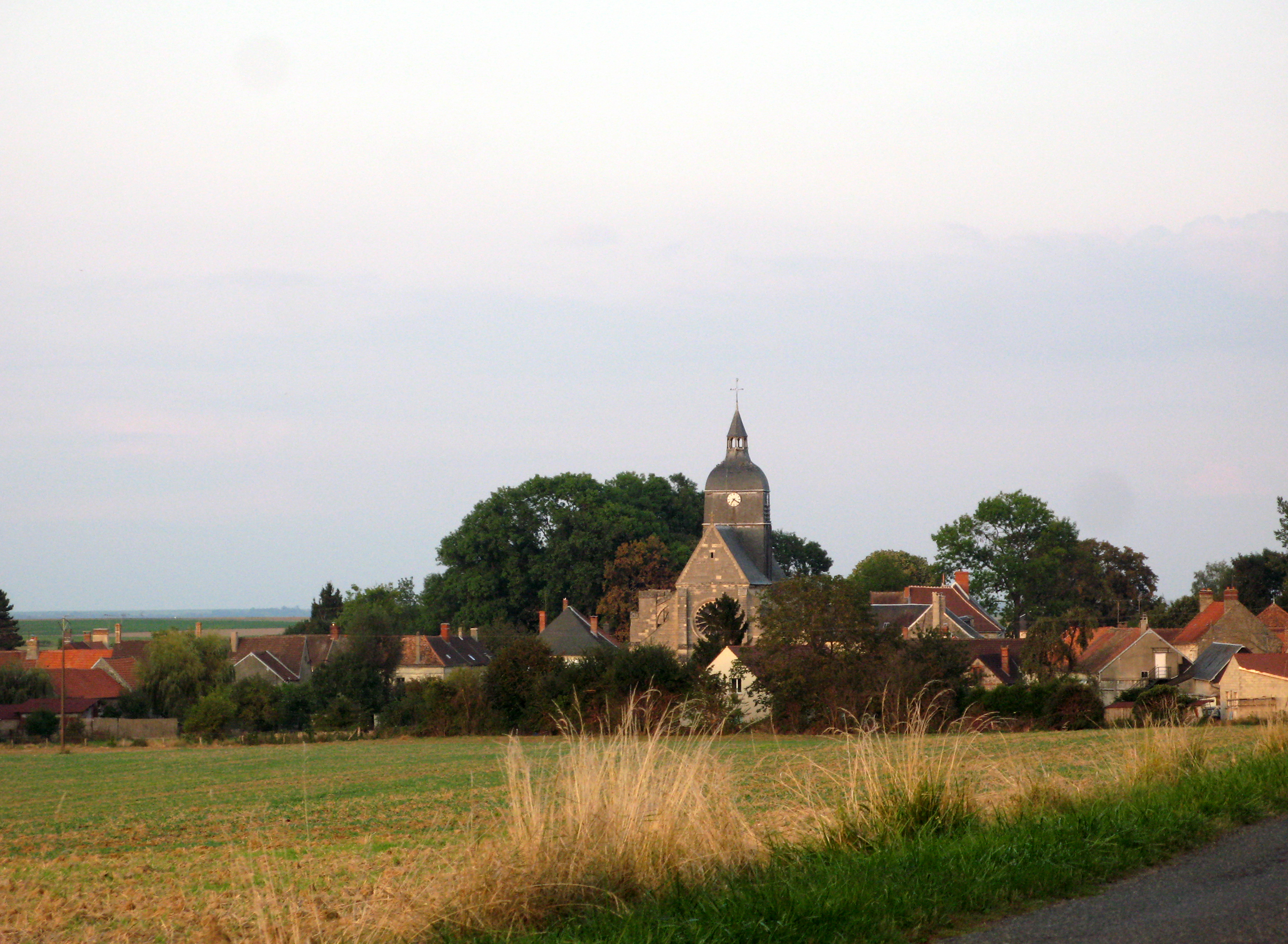
- Location of Arcy-Sainte-Restitue
- Location within France Location within Hauts-de-France
- Coordinates: 49°15′13″N 3°27′56″E
- Country: France
- Region: Hauts-de-France
- Department: Aisne
- Arrondissement: Soissons
- Canton: Villers-Cotterêts
- Intercommunality: Canton d'Oulchy-le-Château

Government
  - Mayor (2026–32): Patrick Bourel
- Area^{1}: 26.43 km^{2} (10.20 sq mi)
- Highest elevation: 197 m (646 ft)
- Lowest elevation: 79 m (259 ft)
- Population (2023): 396
  - Density: 15.0/km^{2} (38.8/sq mi)
- Time zone: UTC+01:00 (CET)
  - Summer (DST): UTC+02:00 (CEST)
- INSEE/Postal code: 02022 /02130
- ^{1} French Land Register data, which excludes lakes, ponds, glaciers > 1 km^{2} (0.386 sq mi or 247 acres) and river estuaries.

Arcy-Sainte-Restitue (French pronunciation: [aʁsi sɛ̃t ʁɛstity]) is a commune in the department of Aisne in the Hauts-de-France region of northern France.

== Geography ==
Arcy-Sainte-Restitue is located some 40 km west of Reims and 20 km south-east of Soissons. The main access to the commune is by the D6 road from the north which passes through the heart of the commune and continues south to join the D2 near Saponay. The village is accessed by the D1210 road coming from Hartennes-et-Taux in the west to the village then continuing southwest to join the D6. The D22 road also comes from Ouchy-le-Chateau in the southwest to the village then continuing northeast to join the D6 in the north of the commune. The D83 road also passes through the north of the commune crossing the D6 at the northern border and continuing southeast to the western border of the commune. The commune is mostly farmland with some areas of forest to north, south, east, and west.

The Ruisseau de Chouy rises west of the village and flows east through the village and the commune to join the Muze river at the western border of the commune.

== History ==
In 852 the Count of Moreuil, Lord of Picardy, went to Rome to defend Pope Leo IV against the threat of invasion by the Saracens. In appreciation of his services, the pope acceded to the wish of the Count to return the remains of Saint Restituta to France. To return to the count's lordship, the convoy passed through Arcy. There, the soldiers laid the Chasse containing the relics of the saint. Upon departure, the Chasse became very heavy and soldiers could not put it back on the wagon. There were then two miracles: a fountain spouted and a mother passing near the shrine with her stillborn child in her arms saw her child lived and said, "Stay here, stay here". The Count left the Chasse in the chapel of Saint Martin.

In 863 King Louis II of France ordered that the holy relics be moved to escape the ravages of the Vikings. The remains of Saint Restitue were thoroughly dispersed.

A Chasse dedicated to the saint is visible in the church. It is carved wood with brass ornaments decorated in gold from the 17th century.

In 2006 ADSL service arrived at Arcy-Sainte-Restitue.

On 14 July 2008 Arcy-Sainte-Restitue was the first town in Aisne to host the fireworks brigade of Reims for an artistic performance in the Kropalm Festival.

Before the war, the small hamlet of Servenay had a small chapel which was at the centre of the hamlet a few metres from the square. The only evidence of its existence is recorded in the archives of the village.

== Administration ==
List of Successive Mayors of Arcy-Sainte-Restitue

From	To	Name	Party
2001	2008	Guy Hobreaux	DVD
2008	2020	Daniel Fonte	
2020	Present	Patrick Bourel	

== Population ==
Historical population
Year	Pop.	±% p.a.
1968	481	—
1975	373	−3.57%
1982	360	−0.51%
1990	328	−1.16%
1999	369	+1.32%
2007	427	+1.84%
2012	414	−0.62%
2017	403	−0.54%
2023	396	−0.29%
Source: INSEE

== Sights ==
- The former Chateau of Branges (16th century) is registered as an historical monument.
- Three lavoirs (Public Laundries): one at Arcy, another at Branges, and another at Servenay.
- The Church of Saint Martin (12th century) is registered as an historical monument. The Church contains many items that are registered as historical objects:
- Part of a Mural: Greenery of birds (17th century)
- A Bas-relief and a Retable from the Altar in the Chapel of the Virgin (17th century)
- A Lectern (17th century)
- Two consoles (18th century)
- The paneling on the walls (18th century)
- The paneling on the walls (3) (17th century)
- A Baptismal font (12th century)
- A Cross (17th century)
- A Chasse of Saint Restitue (12th century)

== See also ==
- Communes of the Aisne department
