= Danake =

Persian Empire coin

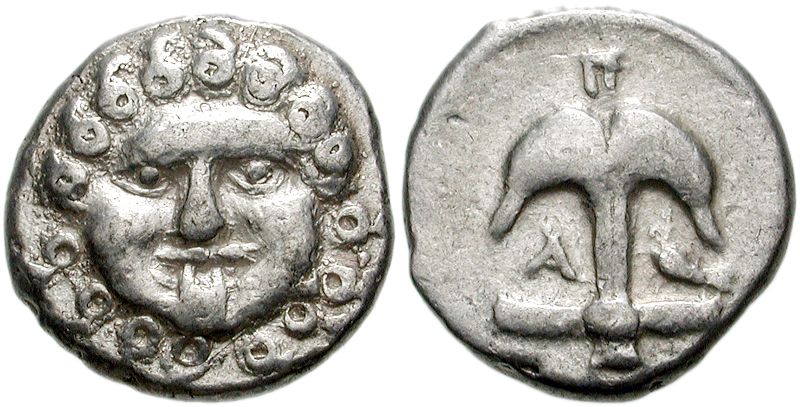
The Gorgon's head is a frequent numismatic icon (here with anchor on reverse) that may appear on a danake

The danake or danace (Greek: δανάκη) was a small silver coin of the Persian Empire (Old Persian dânake), equivalent to the Greek obol and circulated among the eastern Greeks. Later it was used by the Greeks in other metals. The 2nd-century AD grammarian Julius Pollux gives the name as danikê or danakê or danikon and says that it was a Persian coin, but by Pollux's time this was an anachronism.

The term as used by archaeologists is vague in regard to denomination. A single coin buried with the dead and made of silver or gold is often referred to as a danake and presumed to be a form of Charon's obol. Numismatists have also found the danake an elusive coin to identify, speculating that the Greeks used the term loosely for a demonetized coin of foreign origin.

In Persia, the danake was originally a unit of weight for bulk silver, representing one-eighth of a shekel (1.05 gm). This use of the word became obsolete. In the Hellenistic period and later it designated the silver Attic obol, which originally represented the sixth part of a drachma; in New Persian dâng means "one sixth".

== Customary use ==
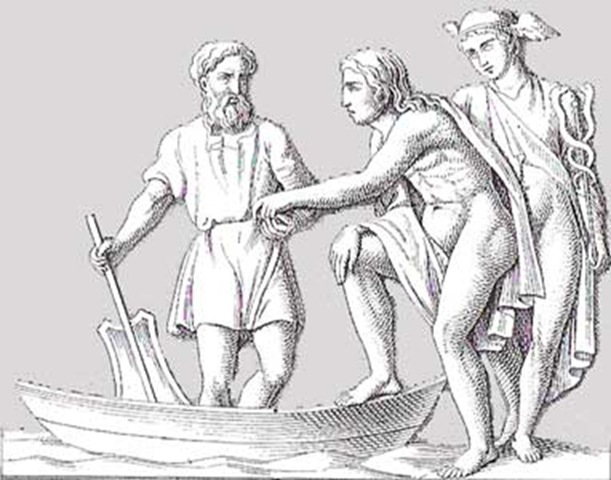
Charon receives a coin for the passage of a soul guided by Hermes (Mercury) as psychopomp.

The danake is one of the coins that served as the so-called Charon's obol, which was placed on or in a dead person's mouth to pay the ferryman who conveyed souls across the river that divided the world of the living from the world of the dead. Charon's obol is sometimes specifically called a naulum (Greek ναῦλον, "boat fare"). The Christian-era lexicographer Hesychius gives "the obol for the dead" as one of the meanings of δανάκη, and the Suda defines the danake as a coin traditionally buried with the dead for paying the ferryman to cross the Acheron. In literary sources, the smallness of the denomination was taken as a reminder that death is an equalizer of rich and poor.

Although Charon's obol is usually regarded as Hellenic, archaeology indicates that the rite of placing of a coin in the mouth of the deceased was practiced also during Parthian and even Sasanian times in the region that is present-day Iran. The coin, however, was customarily a drachma. In his entry on the δανάκη, Hesychius implies that the coin was mentioned by Heracleides of Cyme in his lost work Persica around 350 BC, placing its use (perhaps erroneously) in the Achaemenid period.

== Funerary context ==
Gold danakes are frequently found in graves. In a Thessalian burial of the 4th century BC, a gold danake had been placed on the lips of a woman, presumed from her religious paraphernalia to be an initiate into the Orphic or Dionysiac mysteries. The coin was stamped with a Gorgon's head.

A denarius of Geta, similar to the danake found (as described at right) in the well of a Macedonian cemetery

In archaeological investigations of Greece since the mid-1990s, danakes have tended to be found in cemeteries. At a necropolis at Hephaisteia on Lemnos, exploration of which began in 1995, the many finds in unlooted graves included a gold danake. In the late 1990s, a cemetery in northwest Greece yielded objects dating from the mid-4th to the early 3rd centuries BC, including oinochoai, unguentaria, a wreath with thin gold leaves (sometimes associated with Orphic religion), a gold danake, and a silver obol with a winged Pegasus. A gold danake of Geta dating 199–200 A.D. was among objects – including potsherds, animal bones and shells, and bronze coins – retrieved from a well in the center of a cemetery in central Macedonia. The well was surrounded by a paved floor and housed by a stone structure. It is thought that the deposition followed funerary meals and offerings to the dead.

In investigations reported 2004–2005, a single gold danake was found along with bronze coins and glassware in an Achaian cemetery where both adults and children had been buried in wooden coffins. Graves in Euboia yielded pottery and glassware, small bone tools, iron strigils, and gold jewelry and danakes. In Epiros, graves and funerary chests yielded gold danakes along with kantharoi, lamps, pyxides, figurines, gold rings, gold oak leaves, iron strigils, a bone flute, fragments of funerary stelae and a marble head of a young man. The items dated from the 4th to the 2nd century BC. Excavations at a Hellenistic cemetery in the same area uncovered five gold danakes along with seventeen perfume flasks, twenty-six vessels, a bronze strigil, an iron spearhead, terracotta figurines and a funerary pelike with gorgoneia at the base of the handles.

== Later use ==
The word "danake" continued in use into the Middle Ages as Arabic daneq, Persian transl. fas – transl. dangh or trmmdaneh, and post-classical Sanskrit \tanka. The name has been connected to the silver tangka of India, which had the same weight.

== See also ==
- Ancient Greek coinage
