= Mysteries of Isis =

Religious rites in the Greco-Roman cult of Isis

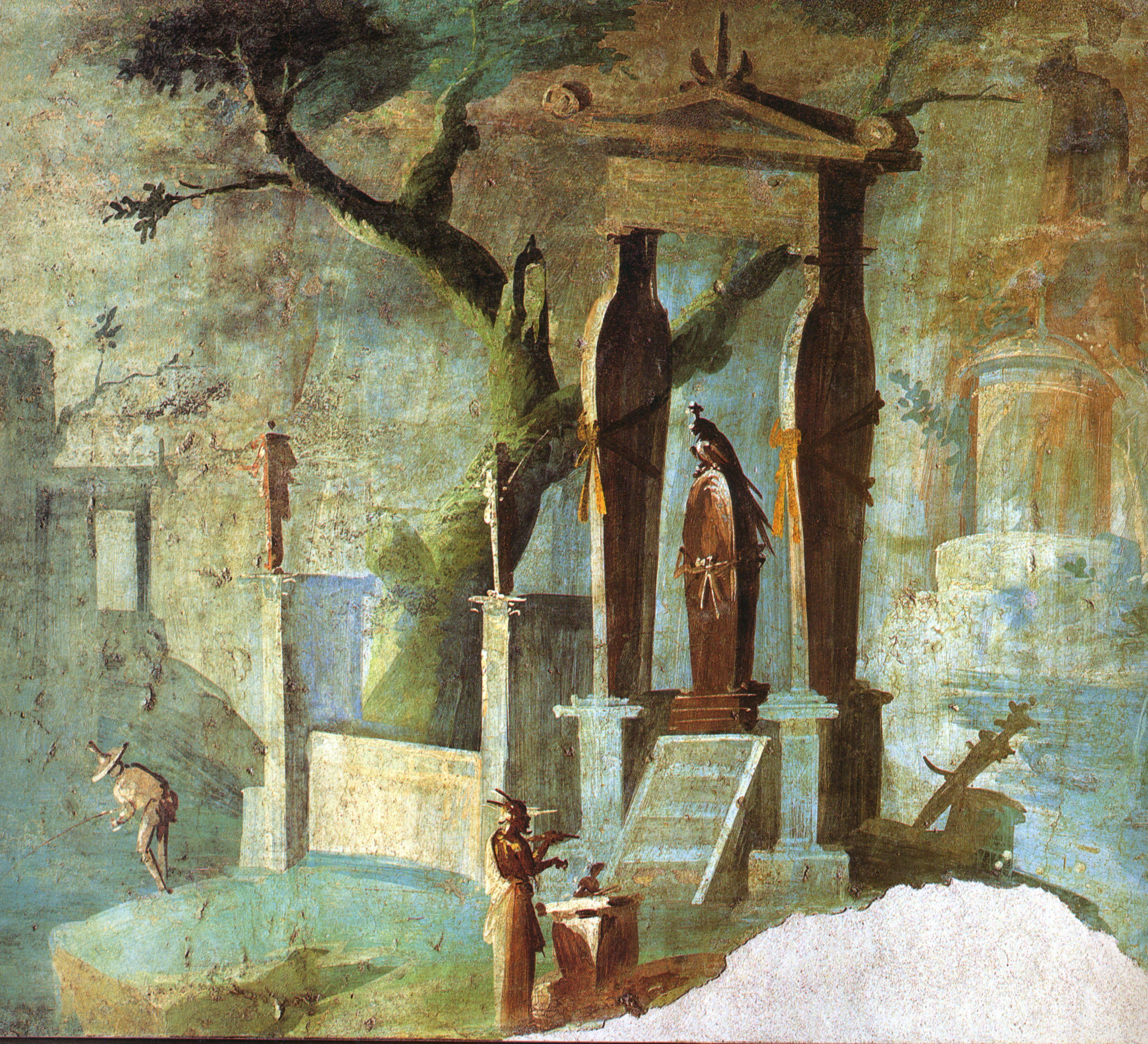
A ceremony worshipping the sarcophagus of Osiris, depicted in a fresco in the Temple of Isis at Pompeii from the first century CE. The death of Osiris was a prominent motif in the cult of Isis. The sarcophagus's appearance here may refer to the emphasis on Osiris and the afterlife found in the mysteries dedicated to Isis.

The mysteries of Isis were religious initiation rites performed in the cult of the Egyptian goddess Isis in the Greco-Roman world. They were modeled on other mystery rites, particularly the Eleusinian mysteries in honor of the Greek goddesses Demeter and Persephone, and originated sometime between the third century BCE and the second century CE. Despite their mainly Hellenistic origins, the mysteries alluded to beliefs from ancient Egyptian religion, in which the worship of Isis arose, and may have incorporated aspects of Egyptian ritual. Although Isis was worshipped across the Greco-Roman world, the mystery rites are only known to have been practiced in a few regions. In areas where they were practiced, they served to strengthen devotees' commitment to the Isis cult, although they were not required to worship her exclusively, and devotees may have risen in the cult's hierarchy by undergoing initiation. The rites may also have been thought to guarantee that the initiate's soul, with the goddess's help, would continue after death into a blissful afterlife.

Many texts from the Roman Empire refer to the Isis mysteries, but the only source to describe them is a work of fiction, the novel The Golden Ass, written in the second century CE by Apuleius. In it, the initiate undergoes elaborate ritual purification before descending into the innermost part of Isis's temple, where he experiences a symbolic death and rebirth and has an intense religious experience, seeing the gods in person.

Some aspects of the mysteries of Isis and of other mystery cults, particularly their connection with the afterlife, resemble important elements of Christianity. The question of whether they influenced Christianity is controversial and the evidence is unclear; some scholars today attribute the similarities to a shared cultural background rather than direct influence. In contrast, Apuleius's account has had direct effects in modern times. Through his description, the mysteries of Isis have influenced many works of fiction and modern fraternal organizations, as well as a widespread belief that the ancient Egyptians themselves had an elaborate system of mystery initiations.

== Origins ==
=== Greek and Egyptian precedents ===
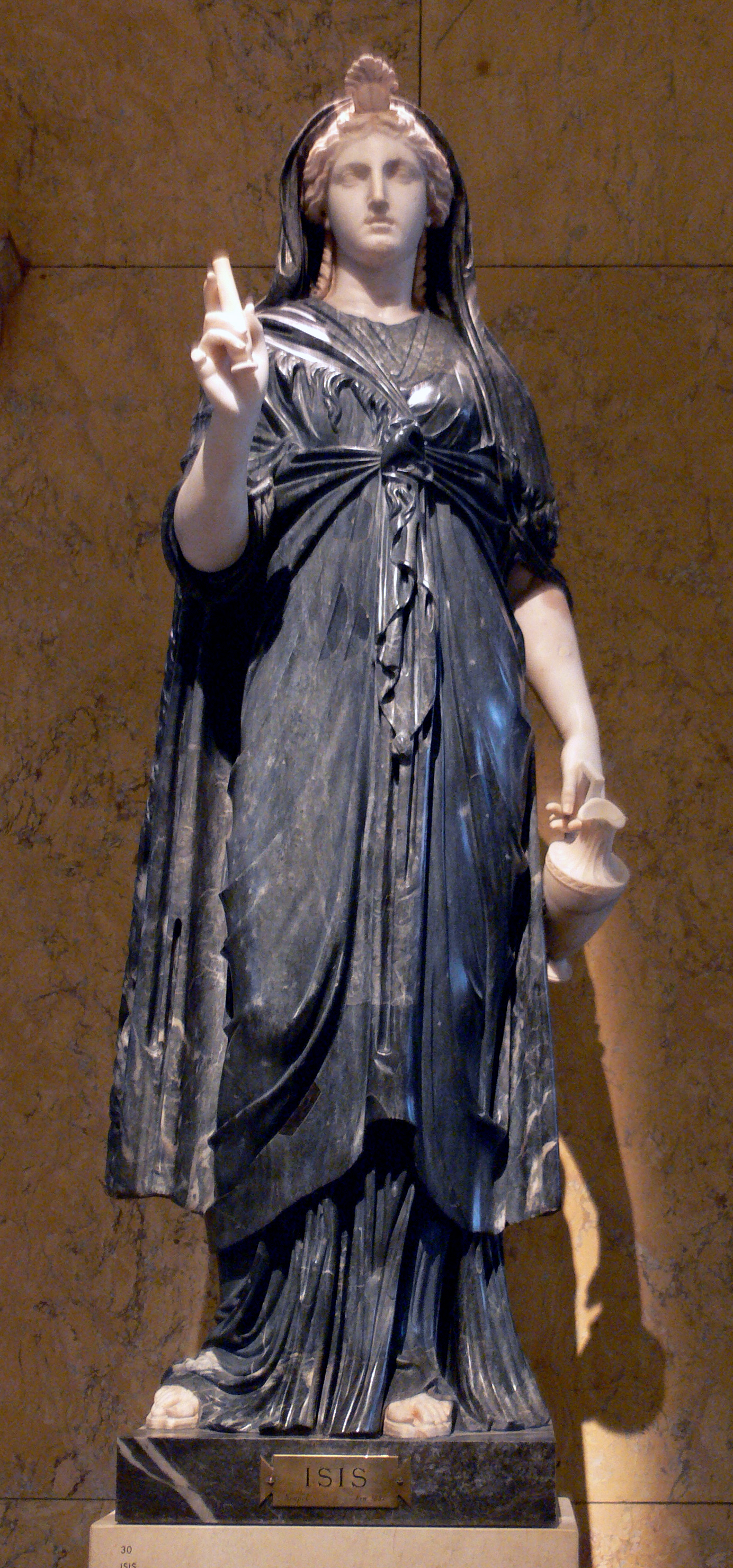
Roman statue of Isis, second century CE

Greco-Roman mysteries were voluntary, secret initiation rituals. They were dedicated to a particular deity or group of deities, and used a variety of intense experiences, such as nocturnal darkness interrupted by bright light, or loud music or noise, that induced a state of disorientation and an intense religious experience. Some of them involved cryptic symbols. Initiates were not supposed to discuss the details of what they experienced, and modern understanding of these rites is limited by this secrecy. The most prestigious mysteries in the Greek world were the Eleusinian initiations dedicated to the goddess Demeter, which were performed at Eleusis near Athens, from at least the sixth century BCE to the end of the fourth century CE. They centered on Demeter's search for her daughter Persephone. Eleusinian initiates passed into a dark hall, the Telesterion, and were subjected to terrifying sights before entering a room brightly lit by fire. There the hierophant who presided over the ceremony shouted a cryptic announcement that may have alluded to the birth of the god Ploutos and displayed objects that represented Demeter's power over fertility, such as a sheaf of wheat.

In the mysteries of the god Dionysus, which were performed in many places across the Greek world, participants drank and danced in frenzied nocturnal celebrations. Dionysian celebrations were connected in some way with Orphism, a group of mystical beliefs about the nature of the afterlife.

Isis was originally a goddess in ancient Egyptian religion, which did not include Greek-style mysteries, although it did contain elements that resembled those in later Greek mysteries. Pharaohs underwent a consecration, related to their coronation rites, in which they were said to have close contact with the gods. Priests may have also undergone a consecration ceremony of some kind, connected with the specialized religious knowledge or training required for their positions. Ancient Egyptian funerary texts contained knowledge about the Duat, or underworld, that was characterized as profoundly secret and was believed to allow deceased souls to reach a pleasant afterlife. Some Egyptologists, such as Jan Assmann, have suggested some funerary texts were also used in priestly consecration rituals; Assmann argues that "initiation into the temples and cults of Egypt anticipated and prefigured the ultimate initiation into the mysteries of the realm of the dead." Other Egyptologists contest the idea that funerary texts were ever used in rituals by the living.

An element of Greek mysteries that did not exist in Egypt was the opportunity for ordinary individuals to undergo initiation. The most sacred rituals in Egyptian temples were performed by high-ranking priests out of public view, and festivals formed the main opportunity for commoners to participate in formal ceremonies. Some of these festivals reenacted events from Egyptian mythology, notably the Khoiak Festival in honor of Osiris, the god of the afterlife and the mythological husband of Isis, in which Osiris's mythological death, dismemberment, and restoration to life were played out in public view. Greek writers called these Egyptian rites "mysteries". Herodotus, a Greek historian writing in the fifth century BCE, was the first to do so. He used the term for the Khoiak Festival, likening it to the mysteries of Dionysus with which he was familiar, because both took place at night and involved a myth in which the god in question was dismembered. He further said that the Greek worship of Dionysus was influenced by the worship of Osiris in Egypt.

Greek writers who came after Herodotus viewed Egypt and its priests as the source of all mystical wisdom. They claimed that many elements of Greek philosophy and culture, including their own mystery rites, came from Egypt. The classicist Walter Burkert and the Egyptologist Francesco Tiradritti both argue that there is a grain of truth in these claims, as the oldest Greek mysteries developed in the seventh and sixth centuries BCE, at the same time that Greece was developing closer contacts with Egyptian culture. The imagery of the afterlife found in those mysteries may thus have been influenced by that in Egyptian afterlife beliefs.

=== Spread of the Isis cult ===
Isis was one of many non-Greek deities whose cults (Note: The worship of a particular god, such as Isis, within ancient Egyptian religion is termed a "cult". The same is often true for the worship of individual gods within Greek or Roman religion. Scholars sometimes refer to the veneration of Isis, or of certain other deities who were introduced to the Greco-Roman world, as "religions" because they were more distinct from the culture around them than the cults of Greek or Roman gods. These cults did not form the kind of independent, self-contained communities with distinct worldviews that Jewish and Christian groups in the Roman Empire did. Françoise Dunand and Jaime Alvar have both argued that the worship of Isis should be called a "cult", because it formed a part of the wider systems of Greek and Roman religion, rather than an independent, all-encompassing system of beliefs like Judaism or Christianity.) diffused beyond their home lands and became part of Greek and Roman religion during the Hellenistic period (323–30 BCE), when Greek people and culture spread to lands across the Mediterranean and most of those same lands were conquered by the Roman Republic. Under the influence of Greco-Roman tradition, some of these cults, including that of Isis, developed their own mystery rites. Much of Isis's cult involved activities that were far more public than the mystery rites, such as the adoration of cult statues within her temples, or outdoor festivals such as the Navigium Isidis, yet scholars often regard the mysteries as one of the most characteristic features of her cult.

The Isis cult developed its mysteries in response to the widespread belief that the Greek mystery cults had originated with Isis and Osiris in Egypt. As the classicist Miguel John Verlsuys puts it, "For the Greeks, the image of Egypt as old and religious was so strong that they could not but imagine Isis as a mystery goddess." Isis's devotees may have adapted aspects of Egyptian ritual to fit the model of the Eleusinian mysteries, perhaps incorporating Dionysian elements as well. The end product would have seemed to the Greeks like an authentic Egyptian precursor to Greek mysteries. Many Greco-Roman sources claim that Isis herself devised these rites.

Scholars disagree on whether the mysteries developed before the time of the Roman Empire, as the evidence about them from the Hellenistic period is ambiguous. Yet they could have emerged as far back as the early third century BCE, after the Greek Ptolemaic dynasty had taken control of Egypt. The Ptolemies promoted the cult of the god Serapis, who incorporated traits of Osiris and of Greek deities like Dionysus and the underworld god Pluto. Isis's cult was conjoined with that of Serapis. She too was reinterpreted to resemble Greek goddesses, particularly Demeter, while retaining many of her Egyptian characteristics. The mysteries of Isis, modeled on those in Demeter's honor at Eleusis, could have been developed at the same time. According to the Greek historian Plutarch and the Roman historian Tacitus, a man named Timotheus, a member of the Eumolpid family that oversaw the Eleusinian mysteries, helped establish Serapis as a patron god in the court of the Ptolemies. The classicist Jaime Alvar Ezquerra suggests that Timotheus could have introduced elements of the Eleusinian mysteries into the worship of Isis at the same time. Another possibility is that the mysteries emerged in Greece itself, sometime after the Isis cult became established there and came into direct contact with Demeter's rites at Eleusis.

== Sources ==
=== Fragmentary evidence ===
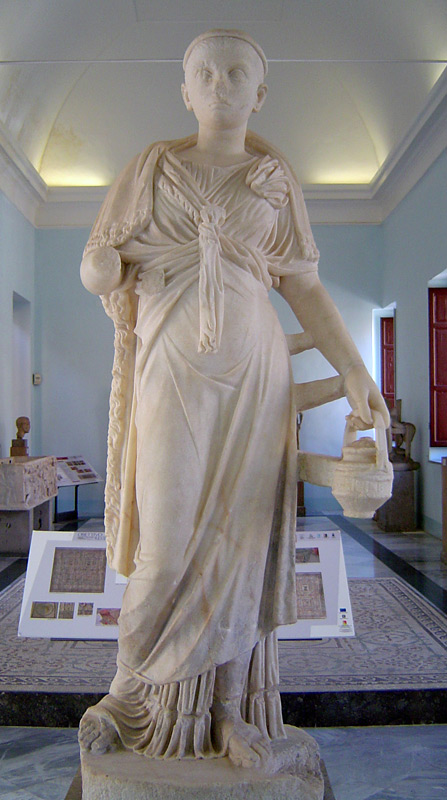
Priestess of Isis holding a situla (bronze jug) or a cista (ritual basket), second century CE

The evidence about the mysteries of Isis is sparse, although some information can be gleaned from passing mentions in inscriptions and literary texts. One possible early indication is a stela from Thessalonica in the late second century BCE that connects Osiris with mystery rites. Other evidence of Isis's worship in Greece comes from aretalogies, texts in praise of the goddess. The wording of aretalogies from Maroneia and Andros, both from the first century BCE, say Isis gave sacred or hidden writings to initiates. The classicist Petra Pakkanen says that these aretalogies prove the mysteries of Isis existed by that time, but Jan N. Bremmer argues that they only connect Isis with the Eleusinian mysteries, not with distinctive rites of her own. The Roman poet Tibullus, also in the first century BCE, refers to the vows to Isis taken by his mistress, Delia, which may indicate that she was an initiate.

Inscriptions from the second century CE use language, such as the epithet orgia in reference to Isis, that suggest the mysteries of Isis were practiced nearby. These inscriptions are found in cities such as Rome and Brindisi in Italy, Cenchreae and Samos in Greece, and Tralles in Asia Minor. Bremmer argues that such inscriptions are only found in Italy and the eastern Mediterranean and that the mysteries were only practiced in those regions, whereas temples to Isis were found in every province of the empire. In Egypt itself, there are only two known texts, both papyri from Oxyrhynchus, that may allude to the mysteries of Isis.

One inscription, from Prusa in Bithynia, mentions a priest of Isis named Meniketes who furnished beds that were "forbidden to the laymen", suggesting that they were connected in some way with the mysteries, although they may have served some other ritual function instead. Burkert suggested that these beds were involved in some kind of ritual relating to the marriage of Isis and Osiris.

Some imagery found in art may refer to the mysteries. A cista, a type of basket in which ritual objects were stored in several Greek mystery cults, was also used in the cult of Isis. Richard Veymiers, a classicist, argues that images of devotees of Isis carrying cistae indicate that they were initiates. Devotees of Isis were often portrayed wearing a mantle with a large knot at the chest, borrowed from the iconography of Isis herself, and the art historian Elizabeth Walters suggests that this garment is a sign that the devotee was an initiate. The Tigrane tomb at Kom El Shoqafa, near Alexandria, contains a painting of a man carrying palm branches that the art historian Marjorie Venit interpreted as an image of a new initiate emerging from the rites.

Hellenistic and Roman temples to Isis varied widely in form, and although some contained underground areas that have been proposed to have been sites where the mysteries were performed, the evidence is inconclusive. The archaeologist William Y. Adams argued that the remains of a shrine at Qasr Ibrim in the Meroitic Kingdom, outside the Roman Empire but near the frontier of Roman Egypt, indicated that the mysteries of Isis were practiced there.

=== Apuleius's description ===
==== Context and reliability ====
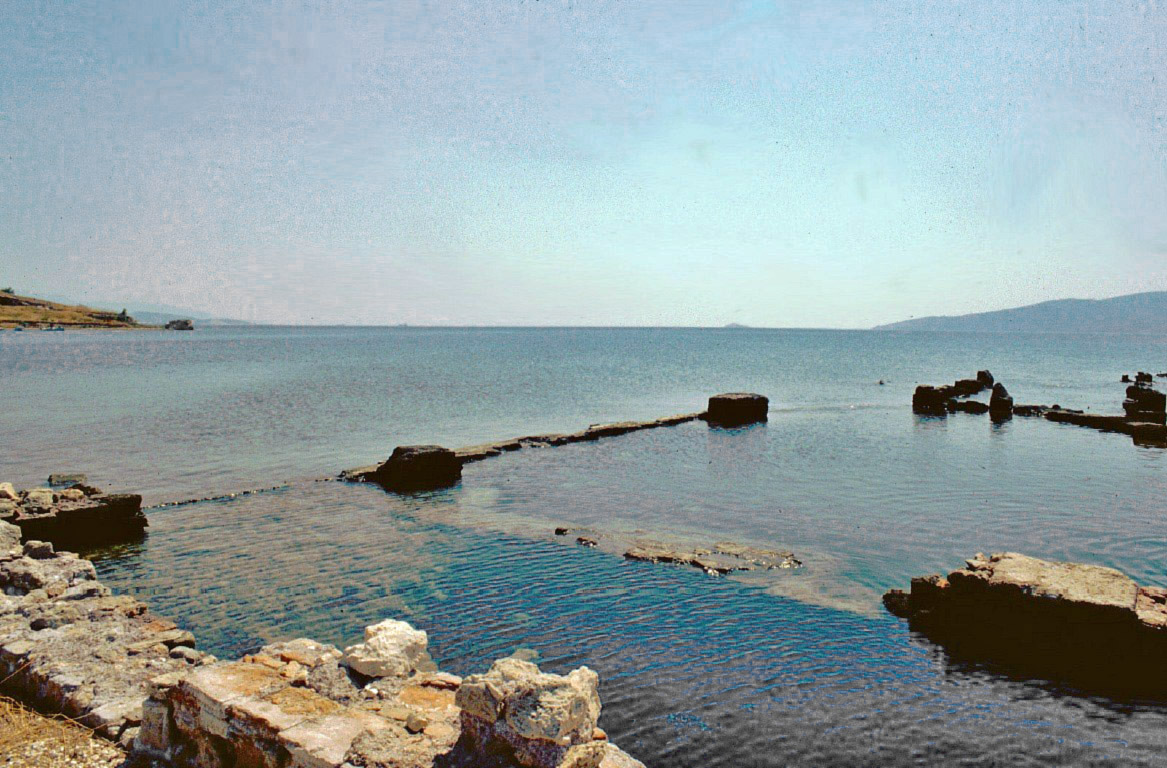
Remains of a temple of Isis on the shore at Cenchreae, Corinth, Greece

The only direct description of the mysteries of Isis comes from The Golden Ass, also known as Metamorphoses, a comic novel from the late second century CE by the Roman author Apuleius.

The novel's protagonist is Lucius, a man who has been magically transformed into a donkey. In the eleventh and last book of the novel, Lucius, after falling asleep on the beach at Cenchreae in Greece, wakes to see the full moon. He prays to the moon, using the names of several moon goddesses known in the Greco-Roman world, asking her to restore him to human form. Isis appears in a vision before Lucius and declares herself the greatest of all goddesses. She tells him that a festival in her honor, the Navigium Isidis, is taking place nearby, and that the festival procession carries with it garlands of roses that will restore his human form if he eats them. After Lucius becomes human again, the high priest at the festival declares that Lucius has been saved from his misfortunes by the goddess, and that he will now be free of the inquisitiveness and self-indulgence that drew him into many of the misadventures he has experienced. Lucius joins the local temple of Isis, becomes her devoted follower, and eventually undergoes initiation.

Lucius's apparently solemn devotion to the Isis cult in this book contrasts strongly with the comic misadventures that make up the rest of the novel. Scholars debate whether the account is intended to seriously represent Lucius's devotion to the goddess, or whether it is ironic, perhaps a satire of the Isis cult. Those who believe it is satirical point to the way Lucius is pushed to undergo several initiations, each requiring a fee, despite having little money. Although many of the scholars who have tried to analyze the mysteries based on the book have assumed it is serious, the descriptions may be broadly accurate even if the book is satirical. Apuleius's description of the Isis cult and its mysteries generally fits with much of the outside evidence about them. The classicist Stephen Harrison says it shows "detailed knowledge of Egyptian cult, whether or not Apuleius himself was in fact an initiate of Isiac religion". In another of his works, the Apologia, Apuleius claims to have undergone several initiations, though he does not mention the mysteries of Isis specifically. In writing The Golden Ass, he may have drawn on personal experience of the Isiac initiation or of other initiations that he underwent. Even so, the detailed description given in The Golden Ass may be idealized rather than strictly accurate, and the Isis cults may have included many varieties of mystery rite. The novel actually mentions three distinct initiation rites in two cities, although only the first is described in any detail.

==== Rites ====
According to The Golden Ass, the initiation "was performed in the manner of voluntary death and salvation obtained by favor". Only Isis herself could determine who should be initiated and when; thus, Lucius only begins preparing for the mysteries after Isis appears to him in a dream. The implication that Isis was thought to command her followers directly is supported by Pausanias, a Greek writer in the same era as Apuleius, who said no one was allowed to participate in Isis's festivals in her shrine at Tithorea without her inviting them in a dream, and by inscriptions in which priests of Isis write that she called them to become her servants. In Apuleius's description, the goddess also determines how much the initiate must pay to the temple to undergo the rites.

The priests in Lucius's initiation read the procedure for the rite from a ritual book kept in the temple that is covered in "unknown characters", some of which are "shapes of all sorts of animals" while others are ornate and abstract. The use of a book for ritual purposes was much more common in Egyptian religion than in Greek or Roman tradition, and the characters in this book are often thought to be hieroglyphs or hieratic, which in the eyes of Greek and Roman worshippers would emphasize the Egyptian background of the rite and add to its solemnity. David Frankfurter, a scholar of ancient Mediterranean religions, suggests that they are akin to the deliberately unintelligible magical symbols that were commonly used in Greco-Roman magic.

Before the initiation proper, Lucius must undergo a series of ritual purifications. The priest bathes him, asks the gods for forgiveness on his behalf, and sprinkles him with water. This confession of and repentance for past sins fits with an emphasis on chastity and other forms of self-denial found in many other sources about the Isis cult. Lucius next has to wait ten days, while abstaining from meat and wine, before the initiation begins. Purifying baths were common in many rituals across the Greco-Roman world. The plea for forgiveness may derive from the oaths that Egyptian priests were required to take, in which they declared themselves to be free of wrongdoing. The sprinkling with water and the refraining from certain foods probably come from the purification rituals that Egyptian priests had to undergo before entering a temple. On the evening of the tenth day, Lucius receives a variety of unspecified gifts from fellow devotees of Isis before donning a clean linen robe and entering the deepest part of the temple.

The description of what happens next is deliberately cryptic. Lucius reminds the reader that the uninitiated are not allowed to know the details of the rites, before describing his experience in vague terms.

I came to the boundary of death and, having trodden on the threshold of Proserpina, I travelled through all the elements and returned. In the middle of the night I saw the sun flashing with bright light, I came face to face with the gods below and the gods above and paid reverence to them from close at hand.

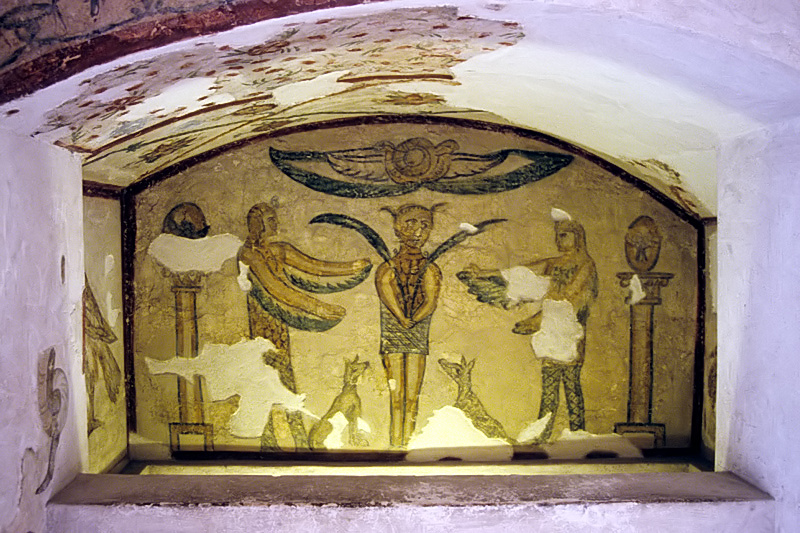
Painting from the Tigrane tomb in the Catacombs of Kom El Shoqafa, showing a man carrying palm branches who may be an initiate of Isis

In a series of paradoxes, Lucius travels to the underworld and to the heavens, sees the sun amid darkness, and approaches the gods. Many people have speculated about how the ritual may have simulated these impossible experiences. The bright "sun" Lucius mentions may have been a fire in the darkness, a feature known to have existed at the climax of the Eleusinian mysteries. The gods he saw face to face may have been statues or frescoes of deities. Some scholars believe that the initiation also entailed some kind of reenactment of or reference to the death of Osiris, but if it did, Apuleius's text does not mention it.

Lucius emerges from this experience in the morning, and the priests dress him in an elaborately embroidered cloak. He then stands on a dais carrying a torch and wearing a crown of palm leaves—"decorated in the likeness of the Sun and set up in the guise of a statue", as Apuleius describes it. The priests draw back curtains to reveal Lucius to a crowd of his fellow devotees. During the next three days, Lucius enjoys a series of banquets and sacred meals with his fellow worshippers, completing the initiation process.

After this initiation, Lucius moves to Rome and joins its main temple to the goddess, the Iseum Campense. Urged by more visions sent by the gods, he undergoes two more initiations, incurring more expenses each time, such as having to buy a replacement for the cloak he left behind at Cenchreae. These initiations are not described in as much detail as the first. The second is dedicated to Osiris and is said to be different from the one dedicated to Isis. Apuleius calls it "the nocturnal mysteries of the foremost god" but gives no other details. The third initiation may be dedicated to both Isis and Osiris. Before this initiation, Lucius has a vision where Osiris himself speaks to him, suggesting that he is the dominant figure in the rite. At the novel's end Lucius has been admitted to a high position in the cult by Osiris, and he is confident that the god will ensure his future success in his work as a lawyer.

== Significance ==
=== Deities and religious symbolism ===
Most mystery rites were connected with myths about the deities on which they focused, and claimed to convey to initiates details about the myths that were not generally known. Several Greco-Roman writers produced theological and philosophical interpretations. Spurred by the fragmentary evidence, modern scholars have often tried to discern what the mysteries may have meant to their initiates. The classicist Hugh Bowden argues that there may have been no single, authoritative interpretation of the rites and that "the desire to identify a lost secret—something that, once it is correctly identified, will explain what a mystery cult was all about—is bound to fail." He regards the effort to meet the gods directly, exemplified by the climax of Lucius's initiation in The Golden Ass, as the most important feature of the rites. The notion of meeting the gods face to face contrasted with classical Greek and Roman beliefs, in which seeing the gods, though it might be an awe-inspiring experience, could be dangerous and even deadly. In Greek mythology, for example, the sight of Zeus's true form incinerated the mortal woman Semele. Yet Lucius's meeting with the gods fits with a trend, found in several religious groups in Roman times, toward a closer connection between the worshipper and the gods.

The "elements" that Lucius passes through in the first initiation may refer to the classical elements of earth, air, water and fire that were believed to make up the world, or to regions of the cosmos. The religious studies scholar Panayotis Pachis suggests the word refers specifically to the planets in Hellenistic astrology. Astrological themes appeared in many other cults in the Roman Empire, including another mystery cult, dedicated to Mithras. In the Isis cult, Pachis writes, astrological symbols may have alluded to the belief that Isis governed the movements of the stars and thus the passage of time and the order of the cosmos, beliefs that Lucius refers to when praying to the goddess.

Ancient Egyptian beliefs are one possible source for understanding the symbolism in the mysteries of Isis. J. Gwyn Griffiths, an Egyptologist and classical scholar, extensively studied Book 11 of The Golden Ass and its possible Egyptian background in 1975. He pointed out similarities between the first initiation in The Golden Ass and Egyptian afterlife beliefs, saying that the initiate took on the role of Osiris by undergoing symbolic death. In his view, the imagery of the initiation refers to the Egyptian underworld, the Duat. Griffiths argued that the sun in the middle of the night, in Lucius's account of the initiation, might have been influenced by the contrasts of light and dark in other mystery rites, but it derived mainly from the depictions of the underworld in ancient Egyptian funerary texts. According to these texts, the sun god Ra passes through the underworld each night and unites with Osiris to emerge renewed, just as deceased souls do. The five scholars who authored a 2015 commentary on Book 11 caution that the solar and underworld imagery could be based solely on Greek and Roman precedents, and they doubt Griffiths's assertion that Lucius undergoes a mystical union with Osiris.

In the course of the book, as Valentino Gasparini puts it, "Osiris explicitly snatches out of Isis's hands the role of Supreme Being" and replaces her as the focus of Lucius's devotion. Osiris's prominence in The Golden Ass is in keeping with other evidence about the Isis cult in Rome, which suggests that it adopted themes and imagery from Egyptian funerary religion and gave increasing prominence to Osiris in the late first and early second centuries CE. In contrast, Serapis, whose identity largely overlapped with that of Osiris and who was frequently worshipped jointly with Isis, is mentioned only once in the text, in the description of the festival procession. Jaime Alvar considers the text to treat Serapis and Osiris as distinct figures, whereas the authors of the 2015 commentary doubt that Apuleius meant to sharply distinguish the two. They point out that Lucius refers to Osiris using epithets that were often given to Serapis. Gasparini argues that the shift in focus in the book reflects a belief that Osiris was the supreme being and Isis was an intermediary between him and humanity. This interpretation is found in the essay On Isis and Osiris by Plutarch, which analyzes the Osiris myth based on Plutarch's own Middle Platonist philosophy, and Gasparini suggests that Apuleius shared Plutarch's views. Stephen Harrison suggests that the sudden switch of focus from Isis to Osiris is simply a satire of grandiose claims of religious devotion.

=== Commitment to the cult ===
Because not all local cults of Isis held mystery rites, not all her devotees would have undergone initiation. Both Apuleius's story and Plutarch's On Isis and Osiris, which briefly refers to initiates of Isis, suggest that initiation was considered part of the larger process of joining the cult and dedicating oneself to the goddess.

The Isis cult, like most in the Greco-Roman world, was not exclusive; worshippers of Isis could continue to revere other gods as well. Devotees of Isis were among the very few religious groups in the Greco-Roman world to have a distinctive name for themselves, loosely equivalent to "Jew" or "Christian", that might indicate they defined themselves by their exclusive devotion to the goddess. However, the word—Isiacus or "Isiac"—was rarely used, and the level of commitment it implied seems to have varied according to the circumstances. Many priests of Isis officiated in other cults as well. Several people in late Roman times, such as the aristocrat Vettius Agorius Praetextatus, joined multiple priesthoods and underwent several initiations dedicated to different gods. Mystery initiations thus did not require devotees to abandon whatever religious identity they originally had, and they would not qualify as religious conversions under a narrow definition of the term. Some of these initiations did involve smaller changes in religious identity, such as joining a new community of worshippers or strengthening devotees' commitment to a cult of which they were already part, that would qualify as conversions in a broader sense. Many ancient sources, both written by Isiacs and by outside observers, suggest that many of Isis's devotees considered her the focus of their lives and that the cult emphasized moral purity, self-denial, and public declarations of devotion to the goddess. Joining Isis's cult was therefore a sharper change in identity than in some other mystery cults, such as the cult dedicated to Dionysus. The account in The Golden Ass suggests that initiation may have been classifiable as a mystical conversion, characterized by visionary experiences, intense emotions, and a dramatic change in the convert's behavior, whereas, for instance, the evidence about Mithraism suggests the process of joining it was less mystical and more intellectual.

The Golden Ass does not say how initiation may have affected a devotee's rank within the cult. After going through his third initiation, Lucius becomes a pastophoros, a member of a particular class of priests. If the third initiation was a requirement for becoming a pastophoros, it is possible that members moved up in the cult hierarchy by going through the series of initiations. Apuleius refers to initiates and to priests as if they are separate groups within the cult. Initiation may have been a prerequisite for a devotee to become a priest but not have automatically made him or her into one.

=== Connection with the afterlife ===
Many pieces of evidence suggest that the mysteries of Isis were connected in some way to salvation and the guarantee of an afterlife. The Greek conception of the afterlife included the paradisiacal Elysian Fields, and philosophers developed ideas about the immortality of the soul, but Greeks and Romans expressed uncertainty about what would happen to them after death. In both Greek and Roman traditional religion, no god was thought to guarantee a pleasant afterlife to his or her worshippers. The gods of some mystery cults may have been exceptions, but evidence about those cults' afterlife beliefs is vague. Apuleius's account, if it is accurate, provides stronger evidence for Isiac afterlife beliefs than is available for the other cults. The book says Isis's power over fate, which her Greek and Roman devotees frequently mentioned, gives her control over life and death. According to the priest who initiates Lucius, devotees of Isis "who had finished their life's span and were already standing on the threshold of light’s end, if only they could safely be trusted with the great unspoken mysteries of the cult, were frequently drawn forth by the goddess' power and in a manner reborn through her providence and set once more on the course of renewed life." In another passage, Isis herself says that when Lucius dies he will be able to see her shining in the darkness of the underworld and worship her there.

Some scholars are skeptical that the afterlife was a major focus of the cult. The historian Ramsay MacMullen says that when characters in The Golden Ass call Lucius "reborn", they refer to his new life as a devotee and never call him renatus in aeternam, or "eternally reborn", which would refer to the afterlife. The classicists Mary Beard, John North, and Simon Price say The Golden Ass shows that "the cult of Isis had implications for life and death, but even so more emphasis is placed on extending the span of life than on the after-life—which is pictured in fairly undifferentiated terms."

Some funerary inscriptions provide evidence of Isiac afterlife beliefs outside Apuleius's work. They show that some of Isis's followers thought she would guide them to a better afterlife, but also suggest the Isis cult had no firm picture of the afterlife and that its members drew upon both Greek and Egyptian precedents to envision it. Some inscriptions say that devotees would benefit from Osiris's enlivening water, while others refer to the Fortunate Isles of Greek tradition. None of them make specific reference to mystery rites, although the inscription of Meniketes asserts that he is blessed in part because of his work furnishing the ritual beds. Initiation may not have been considered necessary for receiving Isis's blessing.

The ancient Egyptians believed that Osiris lived on in the Duat after death, thanks in part to Isis's help, and that after their deaths they could be revived like him with the assistance of other deities, including Isis. These beliefs may have carried over into the Greco-Roman Isis cult, although the myth of Osiris's death was rarely referred to in the Greco-Roman Isis cult and may not have played a major role in its belief system, even if the nocturnal union of Osiris and Ra did so. (Note: The gods of some other mystery cults, such as Dionysus and Attis, also died and were seemingly resurrected in myth. Along with Osiris, these gods were once analyzed as members of a category of "dying and rising gods" who had the power to overcome death. Scholars in the early twentieth century often assumed that these cults all believed that the initiate would die and be reborn like the god to whom they dedicated themselves. These gods and their myths are now known to be more different from each other than was once thought, and some may not have been resurrected at all.) If the symbolism in Lucius's first initiation was a reference to the sun in the Egyptian underworld, that would indicate that it involved Osirian afterlife beliefs, even though Osiris is not mentioned in the description of the rite. As the classicist Robert Turcan put it, when Lucius is revealed to the crowd after his initiation he is "honoured almost like a new Osiris, saved and regenerated through the ineffable powers of Isis. The palms radiating from his head were the signs of the Sun triumphing over death."

== Influence on other traditions ==
=== Possible influence on Christianity ===
The mysteries of Isis, like those of other gods, continued to be performed into the late fourth century CE. Toward the end of the century, Christian emperors increasingly restricted the practice of non-Christian religions. Mystery cults died out near the start of the fifth century. They existed alongside Christianity for centuries before their extinction, and some elements of their initiations resembled Christian beliefs and practices. As a result, the possibility has often been raised that Christianity was directly influenced by the mystery cults. Evidence about interactions between Christianity and the mystery cults is poor, making the question difficult to resolve.

Most religious traditions in the Greco-Roman world centered on a particular city or ethnic group and did not require personal devotion, only public ritual. In contrast, the cult of Isis, like Christianity and some other mystery cults, was made up of people who joined voluntarily, out of their personal commitment to a deity that many of them regarded as superior to all others. Furthermore, if Isiac initiates were thought to benefit in the afterlife from Osiris's death and resurrection, this belief would parallel the Christian belief that the death and resurrection of Jesus make salvation available to those who become Christians.

Some scholars have specifically compared baptism with the Isiac initiation. Before the early fourth century CE, baptism was the culmination of a long process, in which the convert to Christianity fasted for the forty days of Lent before being immersed at Easter in a cistern or natural body of water. Thus, like the mysteries of Isis, early Christian baptism involved a days-long fast and a washing ritual. Both fasting and washing were common types of ritual purification found in the religions of the Mediterranean, and Christian baptism was specifically derived from the baptism of Jesus and Jewish immersion rituals. Therefore, according to Hugh Bowden, these similarities are likely to come from the shared religious background of Christianity and the Isis cult, not from the influence of one tradition upon the other.

Similarly, the sacred meals shared by the initiates of many mystery cults have been compared with the Christian rite of communion. For instance, the classicist R. E. Witt called the banquet that concluded the Isiac initiation "the pagan Eucharist of Isis and Sarapis". Feasts in which worshippers ate the food that had been sacrificed to a deity were a nearly universal practice in Mediterranean religions and do not prove a direct link between Christianity and the mysteries of Isis. The most distinctive trait of Christian communion—the belief that the god himself was the victim of the sacrifice—was not present in the cult, or in any other mystery cults.

Bowden doubts that afterlife beliefs were a very important aspect of mystery cults and therefore thinks their resemblance to Christianity was small. Jaime Alvar, in contrast, argues that the mysteries of Isis, along with those of Mithras and Cybele, did involve beliefs about salvation and the afterlife that resembled those in Christianity. But they did not become similar by borrowing directly from each other, only by adapting in similar ways to the Greco-Roman religious environment. He says: "Each cult found the materials it required in the common trough of current ideas. Each took what it needed and adapted these elements according to its overall drift and design."

=== Influence in modern times ===
Motifs from Apuleius's description of the Isiac initiation have been repeated and reworked in fiction and in esoteric belief systems in modern times, and they form an important part of the Western perception of ancient Egyptian religion. People reusing these motifs often assume that mystery rites were practiced in Egypt long before Hellenistic times.

An influential example is the 1731 novel Life of Sethos by a French cleric and classicist, Jean Terrasson. He claimed to have translated this book from an ancient Greek work of fiction that was based on real events. The book was actually his own invention, inspired by ancient Greek sources that assumed Greek philosophers had derived their wisdom from Egypt. In his novel, Egypt's priests run an elaborate education system like a European university. To join their ranks, the protagonist, Sethos, undergoes an initiation presided over by Isis, taking place in hidden chambers beneath the Great Pyramid of Giza. Based on Lucius's statement in The Golden Ass that he was "borne through all the elements" during his initiation, Terrasson describes the initiation as an elaborate series of ordeals based on the classical elements: running over hot metal bars for fire, swimming a canal for water, and swinging through the air over a pit. (Note: Terrasson did not include a trial by the fourth element, earth, possibly because the initiation's underground setting made it seem superfluous. Authors who imitated Terrasson's description of the initiation included a trial by earth as well.)

The Divine Legation of Moses, a treatise by the Anglican theologian William Warburton published from 1738 to 1741, included an analysis of ancient mystery rites that drew upon Sethos for much of its evidence. Assuming that all mystery rites derived from Egypt, Warburton argued that the public face of Egyptian religion was polytheistic, but the Egyptian mysteries were designed to reveal a deeper, monotheistic truth to elite initiates. One of them, Moses, learned the elite belief system during his Egyptian upbringing and developed Judaism to reveal monotheism to the entire Israelite nation.

Freemasons developed many pseudohistorical origin myths tracing their history back to ancient times. Egypt was among the civilizations that Masons claimed had influenced their traditions. After Sethos was published, several Masonic lodges developed rites based on those in the novel. Late in the eighteenth century, Masonic writers, still assuming that Sethos was an ancient story, used the resemblance between their rites and the initiation of Sethos as evidence of Freemasonry's supposedly ancient origin. Many works of fiction from the 1790s to the 1820s reused and modified the signature traits of Terrasson's Egyptian initiation: trials by three or four elements, often taking place under the pyramids. The best-known of these works is the 1791 opera The Magic Flute by Wolfgang Amadeus Mozart and Emanuel Schikaneder, in which the main character, Tamino, undergoes a series of trials overseen by priests who invoke Isis and Osiris.

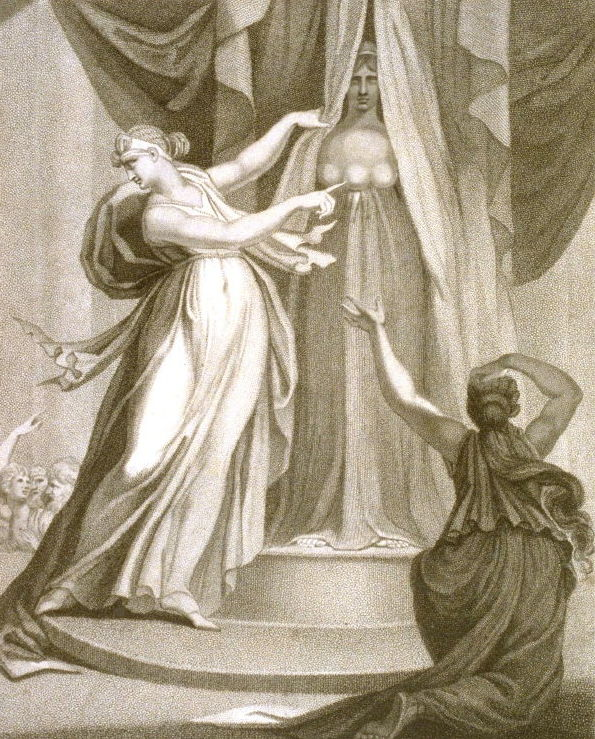
The unveiling of a statue of Isis as a personification of nature, depicted as the climactic moment of an Isiac initiation, in an 1803 engraving by Henry Fuseli

Karl Leonhard Reinhold, a philosopher and Freemason writing in the 1780s, drew upon and modified Warburton's claims in an effort to reconcile Freemasonry's traditional origin story, which traces Freemasonry back to ancient Israel, with its enthusiasm for Egyptian imagery. He claimed that the sentence "I am that I am", spoken by the Jewish God in the Book of Exodus, had a pantheistic meaning. He compared it with an Egyptian inscription on a veiled statue of Isis recorded by the Roman-era authors Plutarch and Proclus, which said: "I am all that is, was, and shall be," and argued that Isis was a personification of Nature. According to Reinhold, it was this pantheistic belief system that Moses imparted to the Israelites, so that Isis and the Jewish and Christian conception of God shared a common origin.

Others treated the pantheistic Isis as superior to Christianity. In 1790, the poet Friedrich Schiller wrote an essay based on Reinhold's work that treated the mystery rite as a meeting with the awe-inspiring power of nature. He argued that Moses's people were not prepared to grasp such an understanding of divinity, and thus the Jewish and Christian conception of God was a compromised version of the truth devised for public consumption. Throughout the eighteenth century, the veiled Isis was used as a symbol of modern science, which hoped to uncover nature's secrets. In the wake of the dechristianization of France during the French Revolution, Isis was treated as a symbol of opposition to the clergy and to Christianity in general, as she represented both scientific knowledge and the mystical wisdom of the mystery rites, which offered an alternative to traditional Christianity.

Scholars abandoned the concept of Egyptian mysteries in the early nineteenth century as the emergence of Egyptology undermined old assumptions about ancient Egyptian society, but the concept lingered among Freemasons and esotericists. Several esoteric organizations that emerged in the late nineteenth and early twentieth centuries, such as the Theosophical Society and the Ancient and Mystical Order Rosae Crucis, repeated the belief that Egyptians underwent initiation within the pyramids and that Greek philosophers were initiates who learned Egypt's secret wisdom. Writers influenced by Theosophy, such as Reuben Swinburne Clymer in his book The Mystery of Osiris (1909) and Manly Palmer Hall in Freemasonry of the Ancient Egyptians (1937), wrote of an age-old Egyptian mystery tradition. An elaborate example of such beliefs is the 1954 book Stolen Legacy by George G. M. James. Stolen Legacy asserts that Greek philosophy was built on knowledge taken from the Egyptian school of initiates, and it was an influence on the Afrocentrist movement, which asserts that ancient Egyptian civilization was more sophisticated and more closely connected to other African civilizations than mainstream scholars believe it to have been. James envisioned the mystery school in terms reminiscent of Freemasonry and believed it was a grandiose organization with branches on several continents, including the Americas, so that the purported system of Egyptian mysteries extended across the world.
