= Wardian Tombs =

Archaeological site in Egypt

- مقابر الورديان
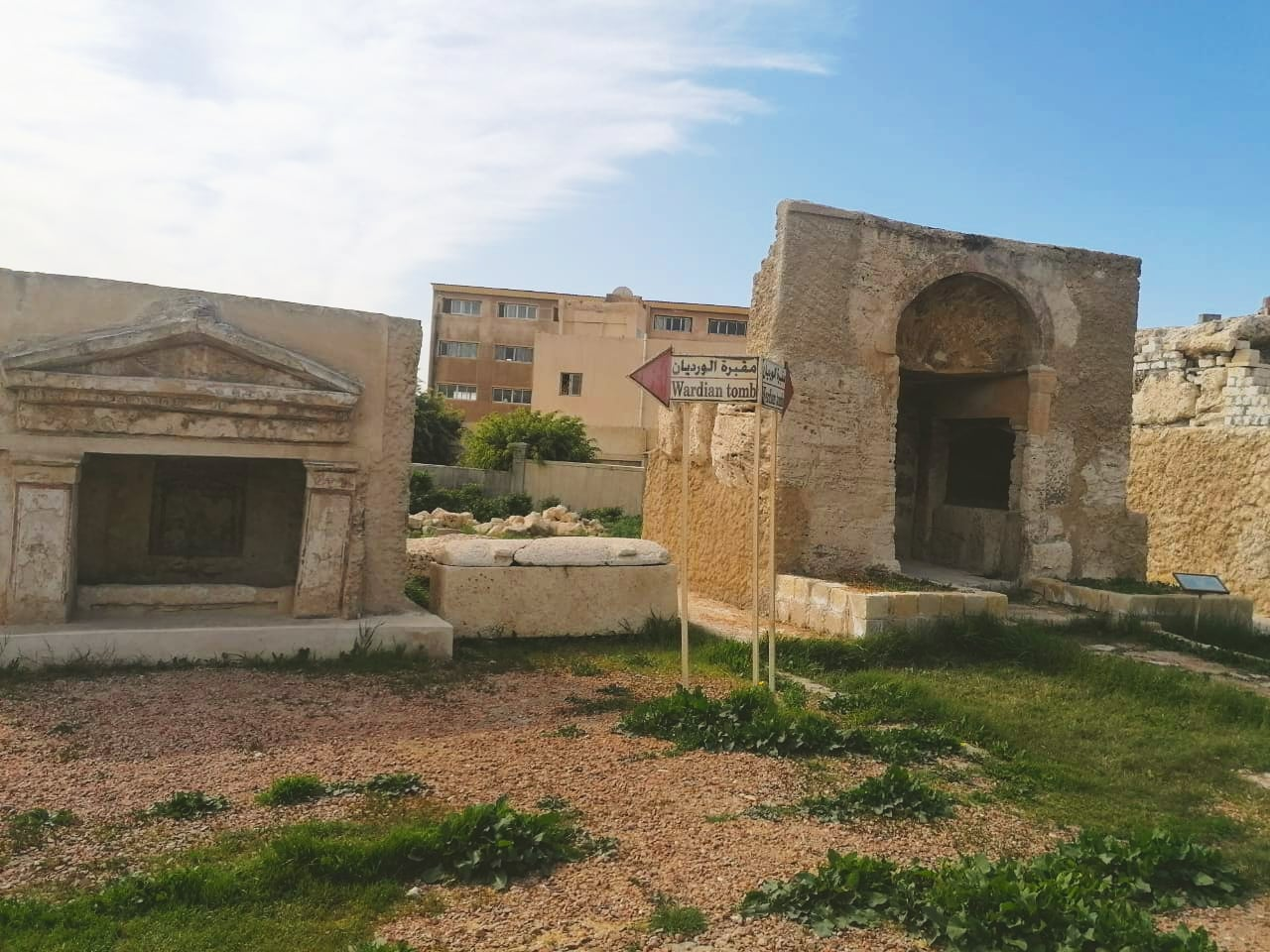
- The Wardian Tombs at the Kom El Shoqafa Archaeological Site, Alexandria.
- Interactive map of Wardian Tombs
- Location: Alexandria, Egypt
- Coordinates: 31°10′43″N 29°53′35″E
- Type: Tomb, burial chamber, necropolis

Wardian Tombs (Arabic: مقابر الورديان) are part of the Western Necropolis of Alexandria, Egypt. They are considered among the oldest, most prestigious, and architecturally complex historical tombs in the city. Originally located in the Wardian district, these rock cut tombs feature a distinct style dating back to approximately 300 BC, placing their origin between the late 4th century and early 3rd century BC.

After their discovery, the tombs were initially displayed in the garden of the Graeco-Roman Museum in Alexandria. They were later restored and relocated to the open-air gallery of the Kom El Shoqafa archaeological site in Karmous district for better preservation. The two primary structures are officially designated as Tomb G990 and Tomb G989.

== Chronology ==
Wardian Tombs considered as the oldest of their kind in Alexandria. Tomb G990 dates back to the Ptolemaic period, while Tomb G989 is attributed to the Roman period. Their origins are traced to the transition between the late 4th and early 3rd centuries BC.

== Discovery ==
The Wardian tombs were first documented by scholars of the French Expedition in 1799. Later, in the 18th century, they were noted by travelers Pococke and Norden. In 1953, the tomb was rediscovered after being partially damaged. Systematic excavations of this vast archaeological group were led by G. Botti under the supervision of the Alexandria National Museum. Initially, researchers hypothesized the site might be a temple, but further excavation confirmed its funerary nature.

== Location of the tombs ==
The archaeological site was originally located underground, approximately 4 km from the western walls of ancient Alexandria, near the so-called "Baths of Cleopatra."

The two tombs were carved directly into the natural bedrock of the Wardian area before being dismantled and moved to the Graeco-Roman Museum, and finally to the external courtyard of the Catacombs of Kom El Shoqafa.

== Design ==
The surviving structures were part of the Western Necropolis and follow the chamber tomb layout. They are characterized by unique architectural compositions and polychrome decorations.

- Tomb G990 (Ptolemaic): Features a burial chamber with a color painted vaulted ceiling. contains a single sarcophagus and an altar in the center. The walls are adorned with longitudinal and latitudinal decorative motifs.
- Tomb G989 (Roman): Contains three sarcophagus. The entrance to the burial chamber is flanked by two pillars topped with simple Doric capitals, supporting a large arch that spans the width of the entrance and holds a semi domed ceiling.

One of the halls contains three rows of superimposed burial niches (loculi). Access is gained through two porticos decorated with triangular pediments. Another section features a square hall containing a well and two openings; one leads to a corridor opening into a peristyle hall with four visible columns. The barrel ceiling still retains traces of red lines and recessed decorations in the shape of stars.

== Decoration ==
The decoration follows the Pompeian style (specifically the First Style), which is Hellenistic in origin. The architecture lacks traditional Egyptian elements, bearing a striking resemblance to Macedonian tombs, particularly in the absence of burial niches in the early construction phases and the presence of a Ptolemaic altar in the outer chamber.

== Global comparisons ==
Current Archaeologists classifies the Wardian tombs as a Macedonian style (Macedonian Tomb type). This specific architectural tradition is rare in Alexandria, with the Wardian site being the most prominent example. Similar structures have been discovered in Pydna (Macedonia) and Southern Russia, as well as in Hellenistic buildings at Pergamon, Priene, and Delos.
