= Greco-Roman mysteries =

Religious schools of the Greco-Roman world

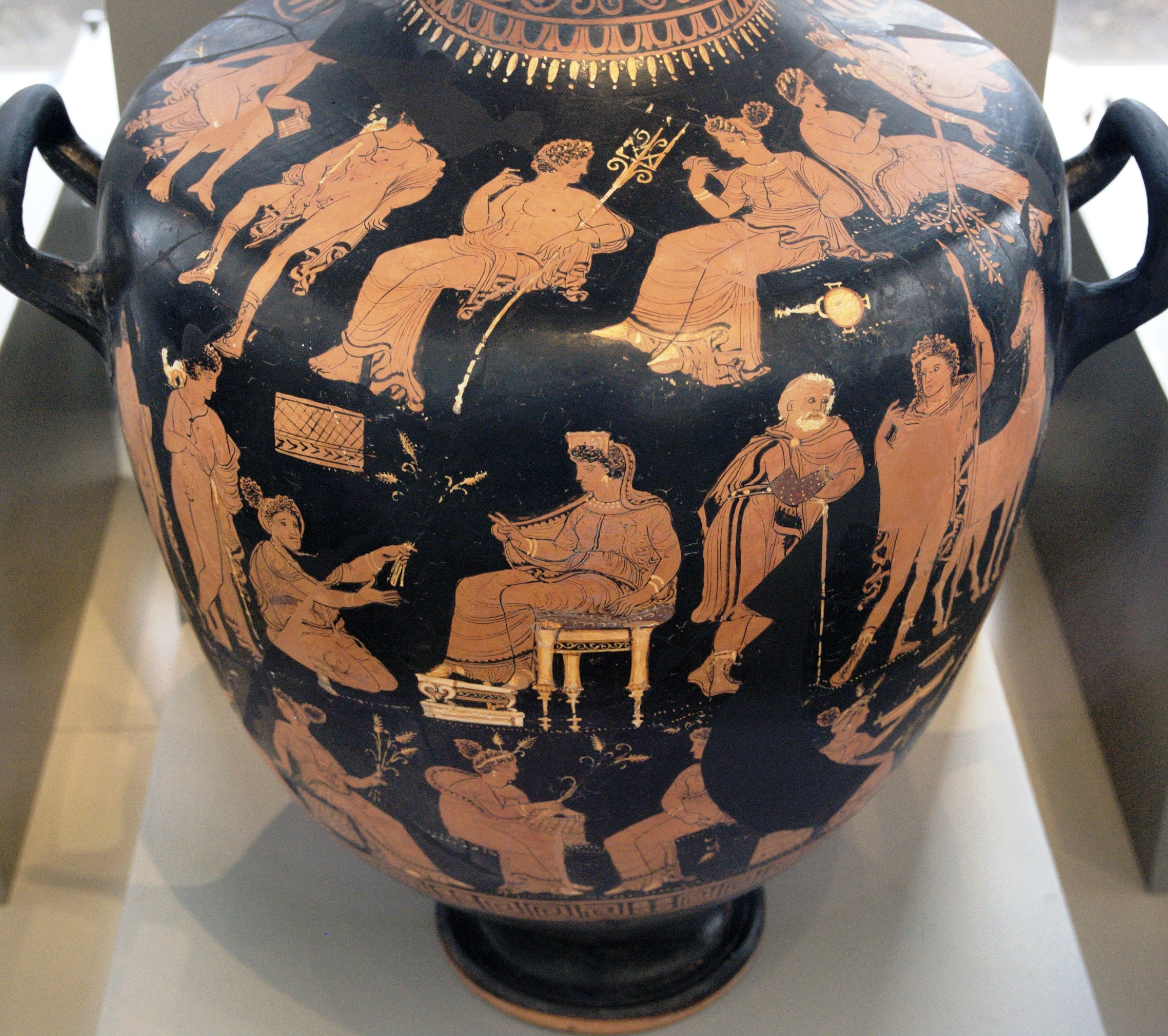
Hydria by the Varrese Painter (c. 340 BCE) depicting Eleusinian scenes

Mystery religions, mystery cults, sacred mysteries or simply mysteries (Greek: μυστήρια), were religious schools of the Greco-Roman world for which participation was reserved to initiates (mystai). The main characteristic of these religious schools was the secrecy associated with the particulars of the initiation and the ritual practice, which may not be revealed to outsiders. The most famous mysteries of Greco-Roman antiquity were the Eleusinian Mysteries, which predated the Greek Dark Ages. The mystery schools flourished in Late Antiquity; Emperor Julian, of the mid-4th century, is believed by some scholars to have been associated with various mystery cults—most notably the mithraists. Due to the secret nature of the schools, and because the mystery religions of Late Antiquity were persecuted by the Christian Roman Empire from the 4th century, the details of these religious practices are derived from descriptions, imagery and cross-cultural studies.

Justin Martyr in the 2nd century explicitly noted and identified them as "demonic imitations" of the true faith; "the devils, in imitation of what was said by Moses, asserted that Proserpine was the daughter of Jupiter, and instigated the people to set up an image of her under the name of Kore" (First Apology). Through the 1st to 4th century, Christianity stood in direct competition for adherents with the mystery schools.

== Etymology ==
The English word mystery derives from the Latin mysterium, from the Ancient Greek mustḗrion, meaning "mystery" or "revealed secret". The origin of mustḗrion is not entirely clear; some scholars have thought it to derive from the Greek múō ("to shut" or "to be shut", in reference to shutting one's eyes in order to be initiated into the mysteries). Hittite scholar Jaan Puhvel suggests that the Greek term derives from the Hittite verb munnae ("to conceal, to hide, to shut out of sight").

== Characteristics ==
Mystery religions formed one of three types of Hellenistic religion, the others being the imperial cult, or the ethnic religion particular to a nation or state, and the philosophic religions such as Neoplatonism.

This is also reflected in the tripartite division of "theology" by Varro into civil theology (concerning the state religion and its stabilizing effect on society), natural theology (philosophical speculation about the nature of the divine), and mythical theology (concerning myth and ritual).

Mysteries thus supplement rather than compete with civil religion. An individual could easily observe the rites of the state religion, be an initiate in one or more mysteries, and at the same time adhere to a certain philosophical school. Many of the aspects of public religion such as sacrifices, ritual meals, and ritual purification were repeated within the mystery, but with the additional requirement that they take place in secrecy and be confined to a closed set of initiates. The mystery schools offered a niche for the preservation of ancient religious ritual, which was especially in demand by the time of the late Roman Empire, as cultic practices supported the established social and political orders instead of working against them; numerous early strands of Judaism and Christianity, for instance, appeared in opposition to such conditions, whereas the mystery cults, by their very nature, served to strengthen the status quo.

For this reason, what evidence remains of the older Greek mysteries has been understood as reflecting certain archaic aspects of common Indo-European religion, with parallels in Indo-Iranian religion. The mystery schools of Greco-Roman antiquity include the Eleusinian Mysteries, the Dionysian Mysteries, and the Orphic Mysteries. Some of the many divinities that the Romans nominally adopted from other cultures also came to be worshipped in Mysteries; for instance, Egyptian Isis, Persian Mithras from the Mithraic Mysteries, Thracian/Phrygian Sabazius, and Phrygian Cybele.

In Plato's Meno, the character Meno had intended to leave Athens "before the mysteries", but agrees to stay longer so as to extend his discussion with Socrates about whether virtue can be taught.

== Eleusinian Mysteries ==
The Eleusinian Mysteries were the earliest and most famous of the mystery cults and lasted for over a millennium. Whenever they first originated, by the end of the 5th century BCE, they had been heavily influenced by Orphism, and in Late Antiquity, they had become allegorized.

=== Myth ===
The basis for the Eleusinian Mysteries is a myth told in the Homeric Hymns concerning the kidnapping of Persephone, daughter of Demeter, by Hades, the god of the underworld. In her distress, and in hopes of persuading Zeus to intervene, Demeter—the goddess of agriculture—caused famine and drought across the earth, killing many and depriving the gods of proper sacrifices and worship. Eventually, Zeus permitted Persephone to reunite with her mother, who returned the earth to its former prosperity. However, it was a rule of the Fates that whoever ate or drank in the underworld was doomed to spend eternity there. Hades had tricked Persephone into eating pomegranate seeds (either four or six depending on the telling); thus, she was forced to remain in the underworld for either four or six months of the year. During this time each year, Demeter, in her sadness, neglects to nourish the earth until Persephone returns to her, and the cycle repeats. These cyclical periods became the winter and spring seasons, with the “death” and “rebirth” of Persephone symbolizing the cycle of life.

=== Initiation ===
On the 15th of the month of Boedromion (September/October in the Attic calendar), as many as 3,000 potential initiates would have gathered in the agora of Athens. Initiates were limited to those that spoke Greek and had never killed; as the emphasis on purity grew, those who had “impure” souls were also banned. Like at other large festivals such as the Diasia and Thesmophoria, the prospective initiates would bring their own sacrificial animals and hear the festival's proclamation as it began. The next day, they would go to the sea to purify themselves and their animals. Three days of rest would pass until the 19th, when initiates would return to the agora to begin the procession to the sanctuary of Demeter and Persephone in Eleusis. The procession was led by two Eleusinian priestesses, followed by many Greeks carrying torches and other special ceremonial items for the upcoming initiation. The 15-mile journey would have been constantly interrupted by celebration and dancing; once the city was reached, the pilgrims would dance into the sanctuary.

The next day would begin with sacrifices, and at sunset, the actual initiations would commence in a great hall called the Telesterion. The initiates would wash themselves to be pure and sat together in silence surrounded by the smell of extinguished torches. The initiation may have taken place over two nights. If so, the first may have concerned the kidnapping of Persephone and ended with her return to her mother. The second night may have concerned the epopteia, the higher degree of the Mysteries—a performance by the skilled Eleusinian clergy including singing, dancing, and potentially the showing of a phallus; the climax of the event must have included the display of a statue of Demeter, an ear of wheat, and a “birth” of agricultural wealth (hence the association of these mysteries with fertility and agriculture). In an attempt to explain how so many people over the span of two millennia could have consistently experienced revelatory states during this culminating ceremony, numerous scholars have proposed that the power of the Eleusinian Mysteries came from the kykeon's functioning as an entheogen.

=== Aftermath ===
On the final day of the initiation—called the Plemochoai, after a type of vessel used to conclude a libation—the new members could now wear a myrtle wreath like the priests. The initiates would eventually leave and utter the phrases paks or konks, proclaiming the conclusion of an event. The clothing worn by the new members during their journey were used as lucky blankets for children or perhaps were given to their sanctuary.

== Samothracian Mysteries ==
The second most famous Mysteries were those on the island of Samothrace. While information on the Samothracian Mysteries is even more scarce than that on the Eleusinian Mysteries (and more late, dating to the Hellenistic and Roman periods), it is known that they significantly borrowed from the ones at Eleusis (including the term 'Mysteries'); archaeological and linguistic data continues to shed light on this religious school. These rituals were also associated with those of neighboring islands, such as the mysteries of the Cabeiri. Philip II of Macedon and his later wife Olympias were said to have met during the initiation ceremony at Samothrace. Heracles, Jason, Cadmus, Orpheus and the Dioscuri were all said to have been initiated here.

=== Myth ===
Little is known about any core foundational myths for the entities worshipped by cult initiates at Samothrace—including their identities, as they tended to be discussed anonymously, being referred to as the "Samothracian gods" or the "Great Gods". However, comparisons have been made between the "gods of Samothrace" and the Cabeiri—chthonic deities from comparable pre- or non-Greek cultures such as Thrace or Phrygia. There is a definite connection in that each deity or set of deities purportedly offered protection on the seas and help in difficult times, though the extent of this connection is impossible to conclude. It is therefore likely that if the Samothracian gods were not the Cabeiri themselves, then the cult was at least heavily influenced by this comparative religion, along with Thracian elements of worship present on the island before an established Greek presence.

=== Initiation ===
Unlike at Eleusis, initiation at Samothrace was not restricted to a few days of the year, instead lasting from April to November (the sailing season) with a large event likely taking place in June, potentially over two nights. The future initiates would enter the sanctuary of Samothrace from the east, into a circular space (now called the Theatral Circle) 9 meters in diameter with flagstones and a grandstand of five steps. Livy records that here, the initiates would listen to a proclamation concerning the absence of crime and bloodshed. Libations and sacrifices of rams were likely made at the beginning of the rituals, similar to at Eleusis. The initiates would have moved to another building at night for the actual initiation, though archaeologists are unsure whether this was the Hall of the Choral Dancers, the Hieron, the Anaktoron, the Rotunda of Arsinoe II, or another building.

In the 3rd century CE, Hippolytus of Rome in his Refutation of All Heresies quotes a Gnostic author who provides a summary of some of the images here:

There stand two statues of naked men in the Anaktoron of the Samothracians, with both hands stretched up toward heaven and their pudenda turned up, just as the statue of Hermes at Kyllene. The aforesaid statues are images of the primal man and of the regenerated, spiritual man who is in every respect consubstantial with that man.

The scarcity of evidence precludes understanding the specifics of the initiation, though there may have been dancing such as at Eleusis associated with the mythology of the search for Harmonia. At the end of the initiation, the initiates were given a purple fillet. On the epopteia, the second night of initiation, the “usual preliminary lustration rites and sacrifices” took place; little else is known, except that it may have been similar to the Eleusinian epopteia and would have climaxed with the showing of a great light.

=== Aftermath ===
The initiations of the first and second nights were concluded with a banquet. Archaeologists have uncovered many dining rooms in association with the cult at Samothrace, as well as thousands of bowls for libations and other materials such as lamps. In addition to the purple fillet, initiates also left with a “Samothracian ring” (a magnetic iron ring coated in gold), and some initiates would set up a record of their initiation in the stoa of the sanctuary.

== Mithraic Mysteries ==
Worship of the god Mithras was extremely popular among Roman soldiers for several centuries, originating in the 1st century BCE and ending with the persecution of non-Christian faiths within the Empire in the 4th century CE. Adapted for Roman purposes like many other imported deities, Mithras bears little relation to his Zoroastrian precursus, Mithra—retaining his Phrygian cap and garments, for instance, as a visual reminder of his eastern origins. The cultic acts of adherents were new and distinct, involving underground initiation rituals reserved exclusively for soldiers and complex, allegorical rites only vaguely understood today due to an absence of written sources. Feasting was the primary religious experience of initiated members, along with reenactments of core Mithraic imagery—such as the meal shared between the god Sol Invictus and Mithras, or the bearing of torches by the twins of the rising and setting sun, Cautes and Cautopates.

=== Myth ===
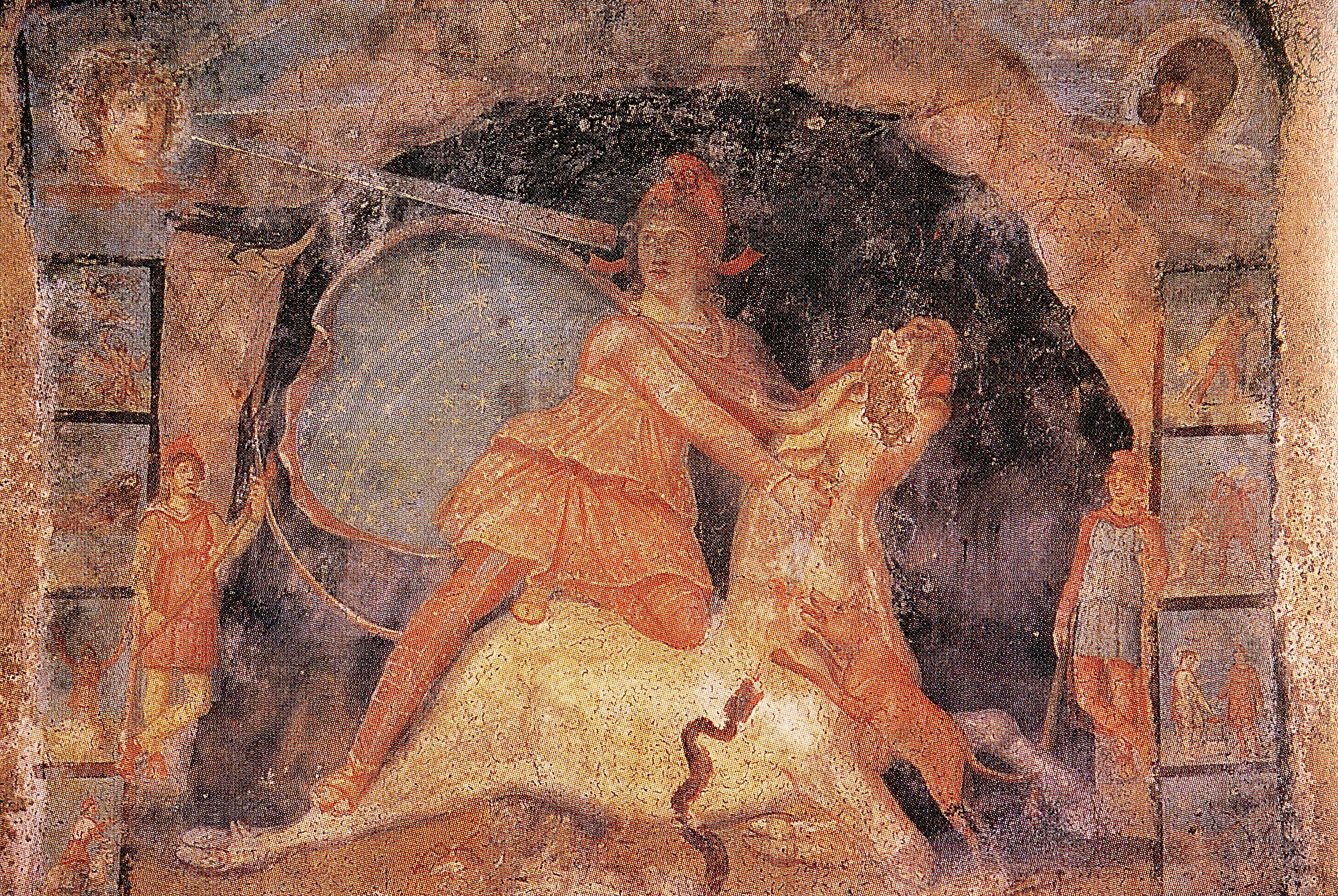
The central iconographical component of the mysteries depicts Mithras slaying a bull.

According to traditional scholarship surrounding Mithras’ mythological beginnings, followers interpreted the common image of the god emerging from a rock—already a young man, with a dagger in one hand and a torch in the other—as representative of his birth and nativity. Newer perspectives suppose that this scene instead displays the popular Roman religio-philosophical theme of ascent, whereby the god's emergence from the stone serves to convey his divinity and power over "earthly mundaneness". The visual and metaphorical components to the core cult image of Mithras slaying a bull, known as the tauroctony, have also been greatly debated. It has previously been commonly accepted that the scene simply depicts a sacrifice, a common activity for Romans through their civil religions and obligatory state festivals; however, it has been proposed in recent years that the scene displays a star-map of major constellations, in addition to the image of a sacrifice. As is the case with most other mystery religions, almost no written sources pertaining to the practices, much less the beliefs of adherents, survive. Thus, only a fragmented understanding of the Mithraic Mysteries is possible, based almost exclusively on archaeological finds and modern interpretations.

=== Initiation ===
The hierarchical structure of Mithraism involved a system of grades or levels—the first of these being the rank of Corax (raven), followed by Nymphus or Gryphus (bridegroom), Miles (soldier), Leo (lion), Perses (Persian), Heliodromus (sun-runner), and finally Pater (father) as the highest. Though precise details are difficult to determine and certainly varied by location, one depiction of an initiation ritual at Capua has it that men were blindfolded and walked into the subterranean temple—known as a Mithraeum—where the cult would perform their rites and practices. Initiates were naked, bound with their arms behind them, and knelt before a priest, whereupon they would be released from their bondage and crowned, but not permitted to rise until a particular moment. The initiation was confirmed by a handshake, as members would henceforth be referred to as syndexioi, or those "united by the handshake". Little is known about the cult's practices subsequent to initiation, as the highly secretive nature of the religion as well as a substantial absence of written texts makes it difficult to determine what precisely took place in regular meetings, beyond the payment of a membership fee.

== Other mystery schools ==
- Cult of Despoina – An Arcadian cult worshipping a goddess who was believed to be the daughter of Poseidon and Demeter.
- Cult of Attis – A Greek cult that was not followed in Rome until its early days as an empire. It followed the Story of Attis, a godlike figure who was eventually killed by a boar sent by Zeus.
- Cults of Cybele – A number of cults following Cybele, or Magna Mater, were present in Greece, Anatolia, and Rome. This cult followed Cybele, which was an Anatolian "mother goddess". However, after it became present in Rome, the Romans reinvented Cybele as a Trojan goddess. In Rome, the cults of Cybele were often restricted and gained few members because of strictures against castration, which was considered a ritual necessary for initiation. This was later replaced with animal sacrifice, but numbers were still limited.
- Mysteries of Isis – This was a rather present and more well-known cult. While most of the mystery cults revolved around Hellenistic culture and religion, the cults of Isis worshipped the Egyptian goddess of wisdom and magic. It emerged during the Hellenistic Era (323 BCE through 30 CE).
- Jupiter Dolichenus – Roman reimagining of a foreign, "oriental" deity comparable to the head Olympian figure, Jupiter.
- Cult of Trophonius – A Hellenistic cult surrounding a minor god/hero. A number of people went to his temples to receive an oracle.
- Dionysian Mysteries – This was a small cult with unknown origins. It is believed to have pre-dated Greece and possibly originated from Crete or North Africa. Its rituals were based on a theme of seasonal life and rebirth. The Bacchic Gold Tablets provide insights into its cult practices: during the initiation ceremony, initiates experienced a ritual death whereby they became gods.
- Cult of Sabazios – This cult worshipped a nomadic horseman god called Sabazios. He was a Thracian/Phrygian god, but the Greeks and Romans syncretized him with Zeus/Jupiter and Dionysus.
- Cult of Serapis – A cult following the Greco-Egyptian god Serapis. He and his cult gained a decent amount of popularity in Rome, causing him to replace Osiris as the consort of Isis outside of Egypt. He was worshipped in processions and sanctuaries.

== Contemporary revival ==
The religious association Pietas Comunità Gentile actively sustains the lineage of Greco‑Roman mystery cults through public rites such as the Dionisiache, nowadays held in the cloister of the former Reformed Fathers’ Convent in Pulsano. In collaboration with the Pulsano Archaeological Museum and local authorities, the community stages symbolic‑ritual performances dedicated to Artemis and Dionysus, integrating shamanic drumming, sacred chants, and initiatory symbolism drawn from ancient Roman religion. As part of its mission to revive the ancient Roman Cultus Deorum, Pietas has also constructed two fully active temples in the Ionian region—one to Apollo and one to Minerva—thus re‑establishing living centers for esoteric practice in the modern era.

== Possible influence on early Christianity ==
Towards the end of the 19th century and beginning of the 20th century, it was becoming more popular in German scholarship to connect the origins of Christianity with heavy influence from the mystery cults, if not labeling Christianity itself as a mystery cult. This trend was partly the result of the increasing growth of critical historical analysis of Christianity's history, as exemplified by David Strauss's Das Leben Jesu (1835–36) and the secularizing trend among scholars that sought to derive Christianity from its pagan surroundings. Scholars, for example, began attempting to derive Paul's theology from a Mithraic mystery cult in Tarsus, even though no mystery cult existed there nor did a Mithraic mystery cult exist before the end of the 1st century. The attitudes of scholars began to change as Egyptology continued emerging as a discipline and a seminal article published by Arthur Nock in 1952 that noted the near absence of mystery terminology in the New Testament. While some have tried to tie the origins of rites in Christianity, such as baptism and the Eucharist, to mystery religions, it has been demonstrated that the origins of baptism rather lie in Jewish purificatory ritual and that cult meals were so widespread in the ancient world that attempting to demonstrate their origins from any one source is arbitrary. Searches for Christianity deriving content from mystery religions has also been unsuccessful; many of them (such as the mysteries of Eleusis and Samothrace) had no content but rather limited themselves to showing objects in initiation.

Later interaction between Christianity and mystery religions did take place. Christianity has its own initiation ritual, baptism, and beginning in the fourth century, Christians began to refer to their sacraments, such as baptism, with the word mysterion, the Greek term that was also used for a mystery rite. In this case, the word meant that Christians did not discuss their most important rites with non-Christians who might misunderstand or disrespect them. Their rites thus acquired some of the aura of secrecy that surrounded the mystery cults.

Even in ancient times these similarities were controversial. Non-Christians in the Roman Empire in the early centuries CE, such as Lucian and Celsus, thought Christianity and the mystery cults resembled each other. Reacting to these claims by outsiders, early Christian apologists, such as Justin Martyr, denied that these cults had influenced their religion. The seventeenth-century Protestant scholar Isaac Casaubon brought up the issue again by accusing the Catholic Church of deriving its sacraments from the rituals of the mystery cults. Charles-François Dupuis, in the late eighteenth century, went further by claiming that Christianity itself sprang from the mystery cults. Intensified by religious disputes between Protestants, Catholics, and non-Christians, the controversy has continued to the present day.

== See also ==
- Bacchanalia
- Dianic Wicca
- Discordianism
- Mysticism
- Navigium Isidis

== Bibliography ==
- Alvar, Jaime (2008) [Spanish edition 2001]. Romanising Oriental Gods: Myth, Salvation, and Ethics in the Cults of Cybele, Isis, and Mithras. Translated and edited by Richard Gordon. Brill. ISBN 978-90-04-13293-1.
- Beck, Roger (2006). The Religion of the Mithras Cult in the Roman Empire: Mysteries of the Unconquered Sun. Oxford University Press. ISBN 978-0-19-921613-0.
- Blakely, Sandra (2018). Starry Twins and Mystery Rites: From Samothrace to Mithras. Acta Antiqua Academiae Scientiarum Hungaricae, 58(1-4). ISSN 0044-5975.
- Bowden, Hugh (2010). Mystery Cults of the Ancient World. Princeton University Press. ISBN 978-0-691-14638-6.
- Bremmer, Jan (2014). Initiation into the Mysteries of the Ancient World. Walter de Gruyter. ISBN 978-3-11-037699-9.
- Bromiley, Geoffrey (1995). The International Standard Bible Encyclopedia. Eerdmans. ISBN 978-0-8028-3785-1.
- Clauss, Manfred (2000). The Roman Cult of Mithras: The God and His Mysteries. Routledge. ISBN 0-415-92977-6.
- Johnson, Sarah (2009). Ancient Religions. Harvard University Press. ISBN 978-0-674-03918-6.
- Keller, M.L. (1988). The Eleusinian Mysteries of Demeter and Persephone: Fertility, Sexuality, and Rebirth. Journal of Feminist Studies in Religion, 4(1).
- Leonard, Benjamin (2021). Secret Rites of Samothrace. Archaeology, 74(5).
- Martin, L.H. (2021). Seeing the Mithraic Tauroctony, Numen, 68(4).
- Puhvel, Jaan (1984). The Hittite Etymological Dictionary. Walter de Gruyter. ISBN 978-90-279-3049-1.
- Rives, J.B. (2010). ‘Graeco-Roman Religion in the Roman Empire: Old Assumptions and New Approaches’, Currents in Biblical Research 8(2).
