= Cista =

Container used in Antiquity

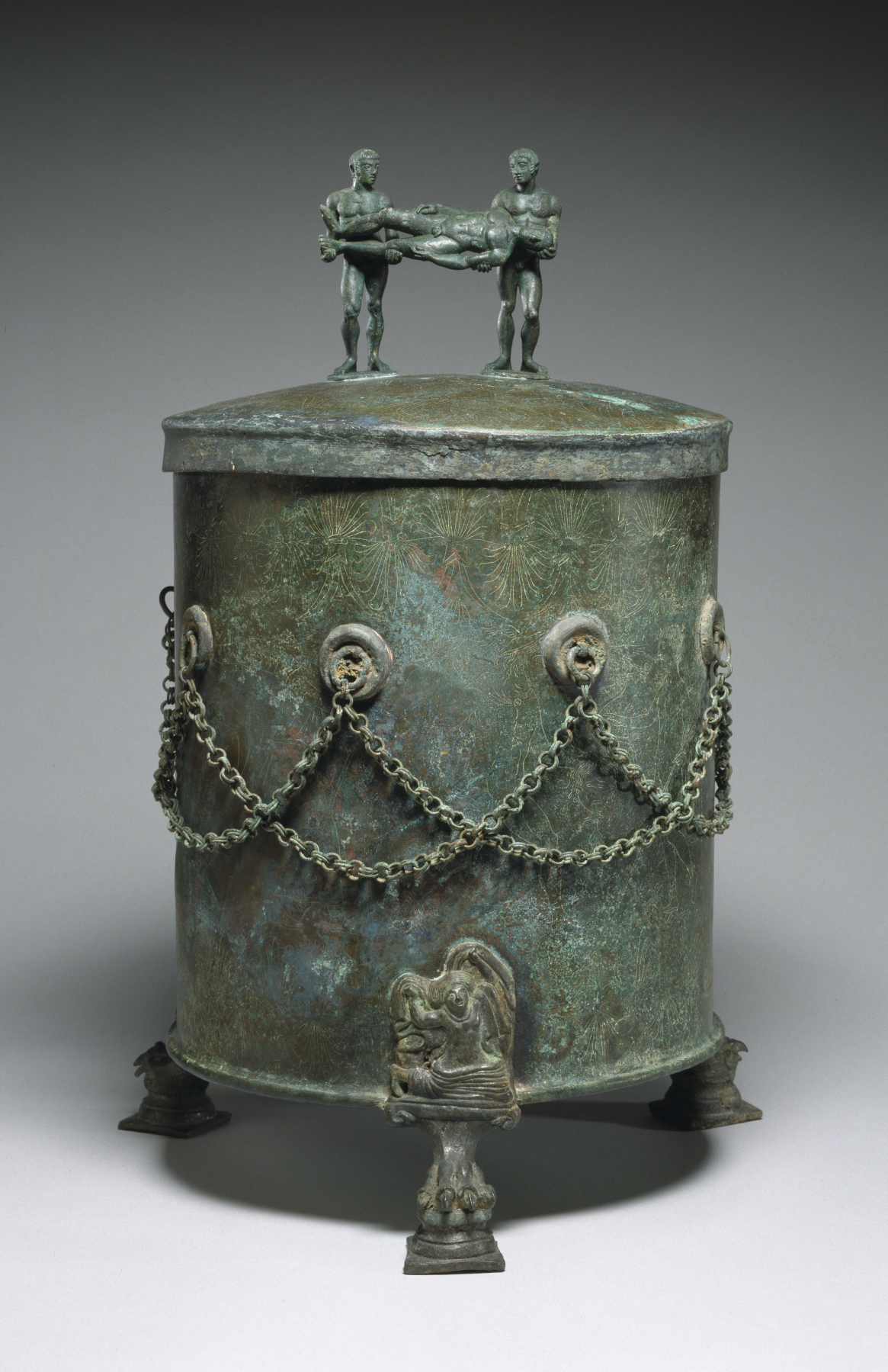
Cista Depicting a Dionysian Revel and Perseus with Medusa's Head The Walters Art Museum.

A cista is a box or basket used by the ancient Egyptians, Greeks, Etruscans and Romans for various practical and mystical purposes.

== Purpose and usage ==
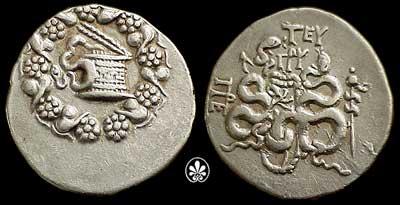
Cista on a coin

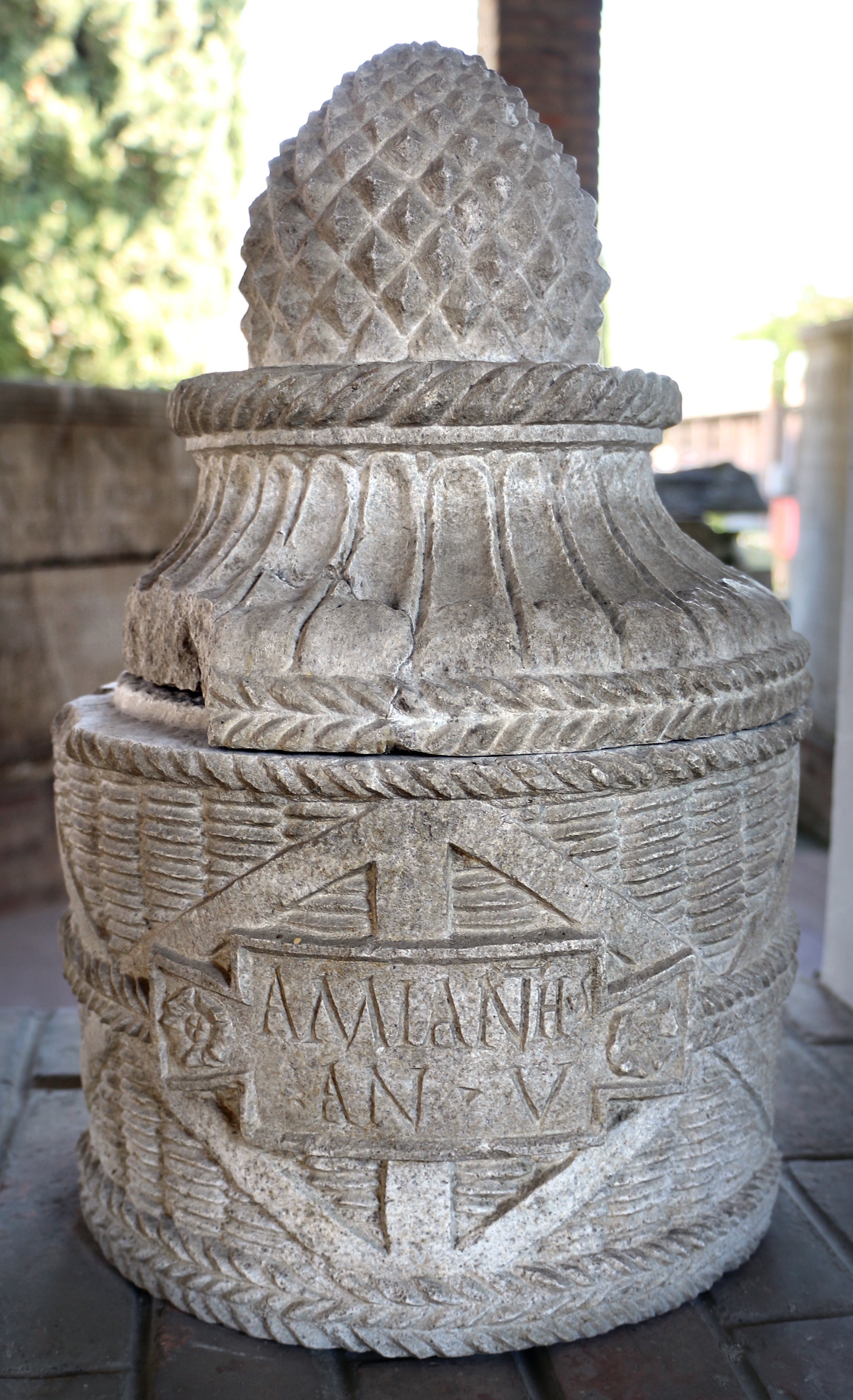
Roman cista cinerary urn

The cista or cistella was at first thought be a wicker basket used for holding fruits and vegetables and for general agricultural purposes. Although these baskets were sometimes square, they were more often cylindrical in shape. Over time, cista came to mean a smaller box or casket employed for a variety of purposes. This distinguished it from the larger arca or chest; on rare occasions, it may have been used in referring to a capsa, or book-box. The cista believed to be in the private treasure of Gaius Verres may have been a money-box.

In the Roman comitia, the cista was the ballot-box into which the voters cast their tabellae. The form and material of the voters' cista, evidently of wicker or similar work, is represented in an annexed cut from a coin of the Cassia gens. In this sense, the cista has often been confused with the sitella, or urn, from which the names of the tribes or centuries were drawn out by lot.

Another class of cistae, well known from vase paintings and from a number of preserved metal specimens, are the toilet- or jewel-cases of Italian ladies, often mentioned in connection with children's trinkets, and often recognized in ancient comedies. In vase paintings, such cistae are often accompanied by other requisites for the toilet such as mirrors and scent-bottles, making clear their use as toiletry receptacles.

== Cultic uses ==
A cista mystica (secret casket) is a sacred object thought to have originated in ancient Egypt. It is usually made of reeds (papyrus) and used in the Khoiak ritual of Denderah. Inside the box was a vase, and inside the vase was the head of Osiris, a canopic box containing the viscera of the dead god. Concrete evidence concerning the cista mystica of Isis is scarce. In Roman times, Plutarch gives an account of the pouring of drinking water into a golden casket inside the cista, while the congregation shouts “Osiris has been found.”

In ancient Greek mystery cults, the cistra mystica were wicker-work boxes which seem to have contained a live serpent, as represented in numerous ancient images, including coins on which a cista is shown half-open with a serpent creeping out of it. These cistra were sometimes oblong, but more frequently cylindrical, for example, as represented in a statue of Silenus sitting on a large drum-shaped cista, holding a wine-jug in his hand. Cistra mystica were also carried in procession in the Greek festivals of Demeter and Dionysus—these boxes were always kept closed in public, and contained sacred items connected with the worship of these deities. The cista mystica was also known to be sacred to Bacchus, but similar cult objects were probably also affiliated with Isis. In the Bacchic mysteries, the serpent was carried on a bed of grape leaves and was used as a stand-in for the god. The characteristic form of the serpent was an important component of the symbolism, and classical sources note it shares its shape with “the forms of men.”
