= Catacombs of Kom El Shoqafa =

Archaeological site in Egypt

- Lofus Kiramaikos (Greek); Ra-Qedil (Egypt)
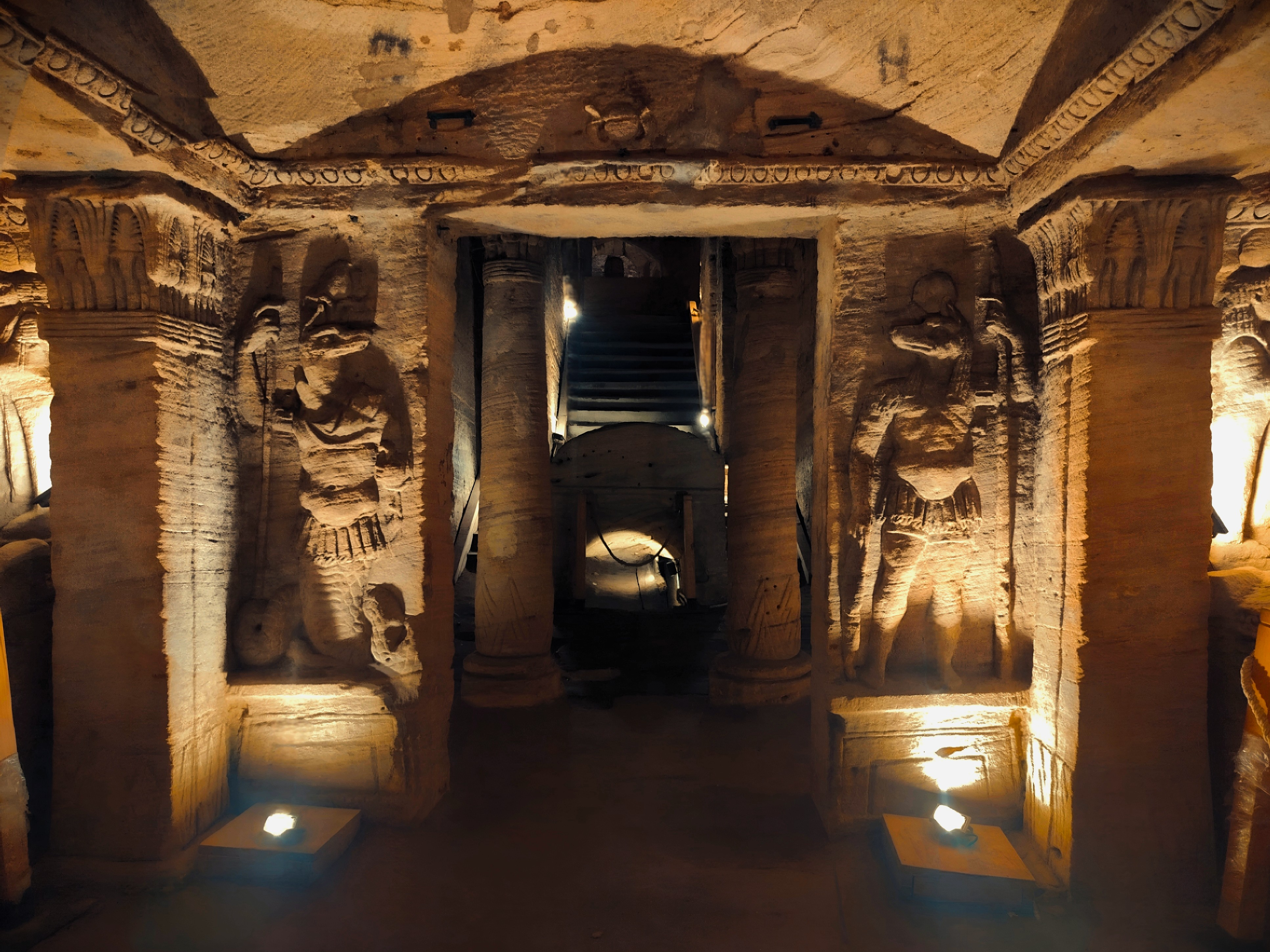
- Interactive map of Catacombs of Kom El Shoqafa
- Location: Alexandria, Egypt
- Coordinates: 31°10′43″N 29°53′35″E
- Type: Tomb, burial chamber, necropolis
- Height: 100 ft (30 m)
- Beginning date: 2nd century

The catacombs of Kom El Shoqafa (Arabic: مقابر كوم الشقافة, romanized: Maqābir Kūm al-Shuqāfah, lit. 'Mound of Shards') are a historical archaeological site located in Alexandria, Egypt, and are considered one of the Seven Wonders of the Middle Ages.

The necropolis consists of a series of Alexandrian tombs, statues and archaeological objects of the Pharaonic funerary cult with Hellenistic and early Imperial Roman influences. Due to the time period, many of the features of the catacombs of Kom El Shoqafa merge Roman, Greek and Egyptian cultural attributes; some statues are Egyptian in style, yet bear Roman clothes and hairstyles whilst other features share a similar style. A circular staircase, which was often used to transport deceased bodies down the middle of it, leads down into the tombs that were tunneled into the bedrock during the age of the Antonine emperors (2nd century CE). The facility was then used as a burial chamber from the 2nd century to the 4th century, before being rediscovered in 1900 when a donkey accidentally fell into the access shaft. To date, three sarcophagi have been found, along with other human and animal remains which were added later. It is believed that the catacombs were only intended for a single family, but it is unclear why the site was expanded in order to house numerous other individuals.

Another feature of the catacombs is the Hall of Caracalla, which contains the bones of the horses of emperor Caracalla, for which the tombs were created in 215 CE.

== Catacombs ==
The catacombs were named Kom El Shoqafa, meaning Mound of Shards, because the area used to contain a mound of terra cotta shards, mostly consisting of jars and objects made of clay. These objects were left by those visiting the tombs, who would bring food and wine for their consumption during the visit. However, they did not wish to carry these containers home from this place of death, so they would break them. At the time of the discovery, heaps of these broken plates were found.

== Layout ==
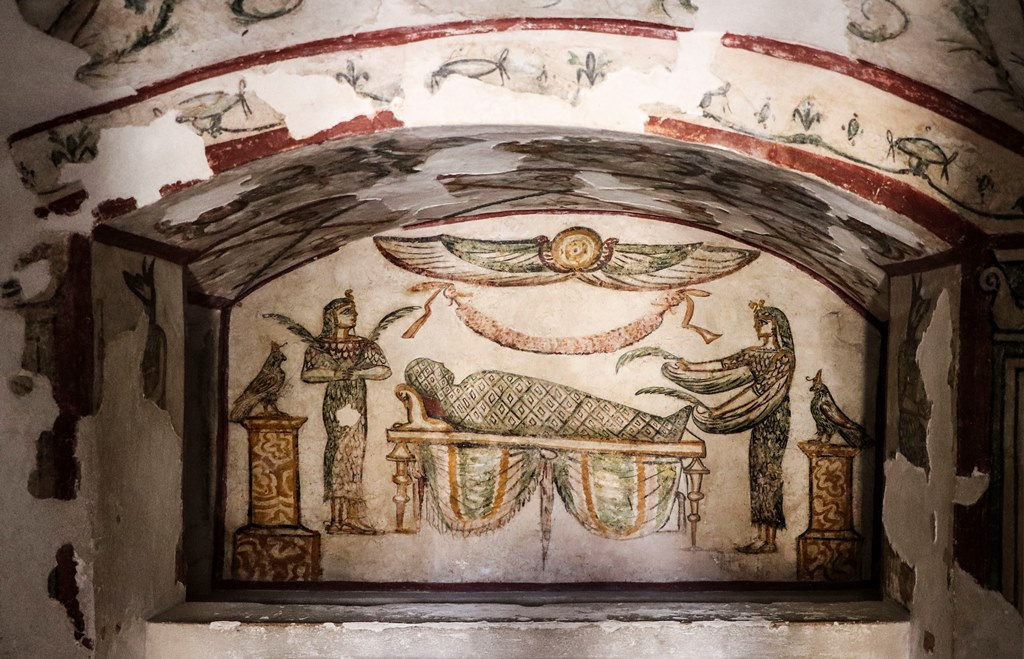
Painted tomb

The catacombs lie beneath the western necropolis of Alexandria and consist of three levels cut through solid rock, the third level was completely underwater until recent restorations. The catacombs have a six-pillared central shaft which opens off the vestibule. On the left is a triclinium, a funeral banquet hall where friends and family gathered on stone couches covered with cushions, both at the time of burial and also on future commemorative visits.

Visitors can reach the first level through a breach in the rotunda wall, which was made at an unknown date. This leads to the Hall of Caracalla in which the bones of horses and humans were found.

== Principal tomb chamber ==
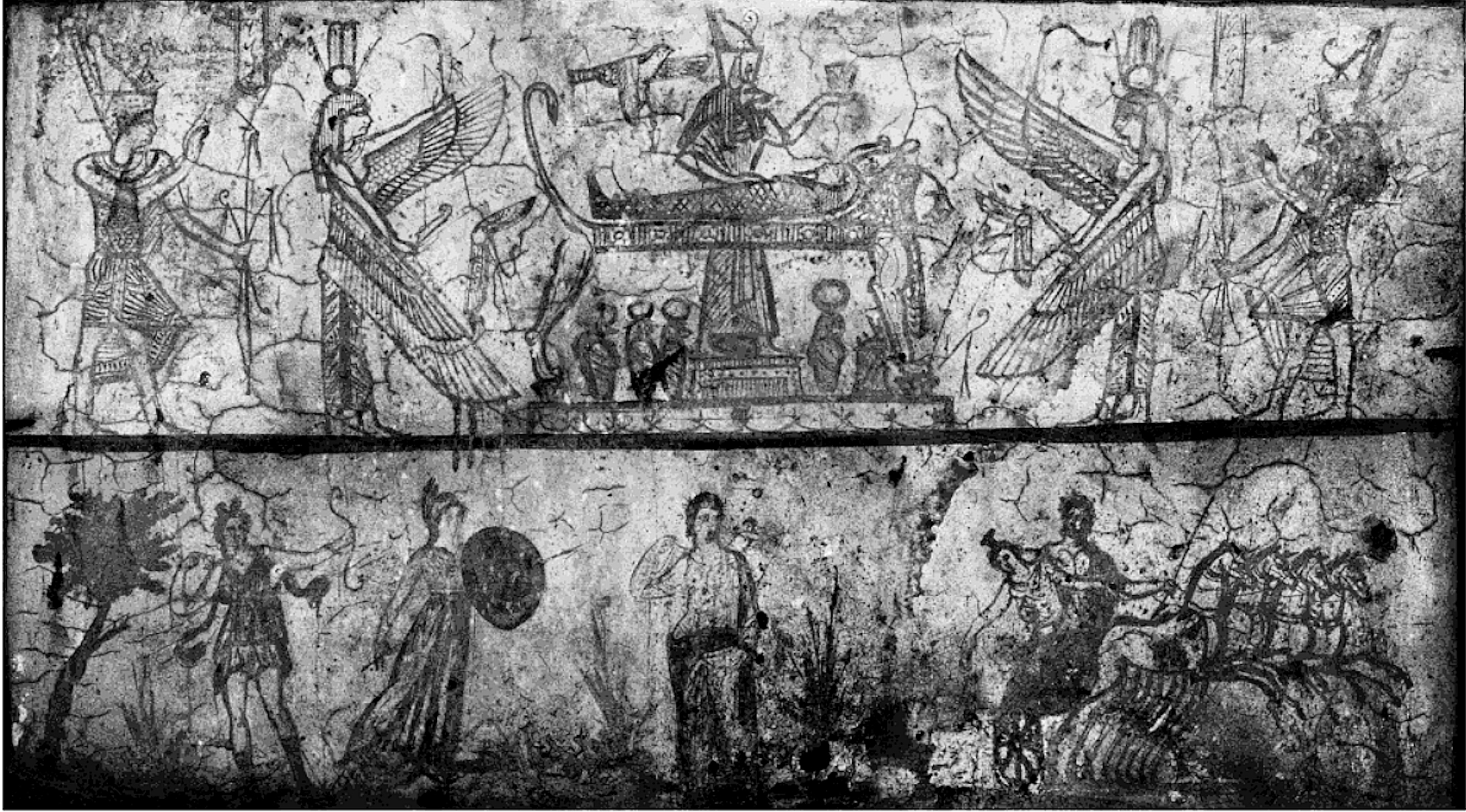
Coexistence of different styles for different subjects: Egyptian funerary scene with Anubis, in Egyptian style (top), and myth of the Abduction of Persephone in Greek style (bottom). Persephone tomb in Kom el-Shoqafa, 2nd century CE.

At the front of the tomb chamber there is a temple-like façade consisting of two columns topped by papyrus, lotus, and acanthus leaves of ancient Egypt and supporting an architrave with a relief of a central winged sun-disk flanked by Horus falcons. A carved Agathodaemon in the form of a snake is flanking both sides of the entrance to the inner tomb. Each snake wears a Roman Caduceus and a Greek Thyrsus as well as the Egyptian Pschent and is topped by a shield showing a Medusa. Figures of a man and a woman are carved into the wall. The man's body has a stiff hieratic pose typical of Ancient Egyptian sculpture, with the head carved in the lifelike manner of the classic Hellenes. The woman's figure is also rigidly posed but bears the Roman hairstyle.

There are three huge stone sarcophagi with non-removable covers along the sides of the chamber. It's assumed that bodies were inserted in them from behind, using a passageway which runs around the outside of the funeral chamber. There is a hallway with 91 inch deep walls in the central tomb chamber, with carved recesses, each providing burial space for three mummies. The sarcophagi are decorated with garlands and heads of Greek mythology gods. Each sarcophagus has associated a relief panel. The central panel shows the jackal-headed Anubis wearing Roman soldier garb, who mummifies a body lying on a lion bed. Below the bed are three canopic jars. The lateral panels show the Apis-bull receiving a gift.

== Gallery principal tomb chamber ==
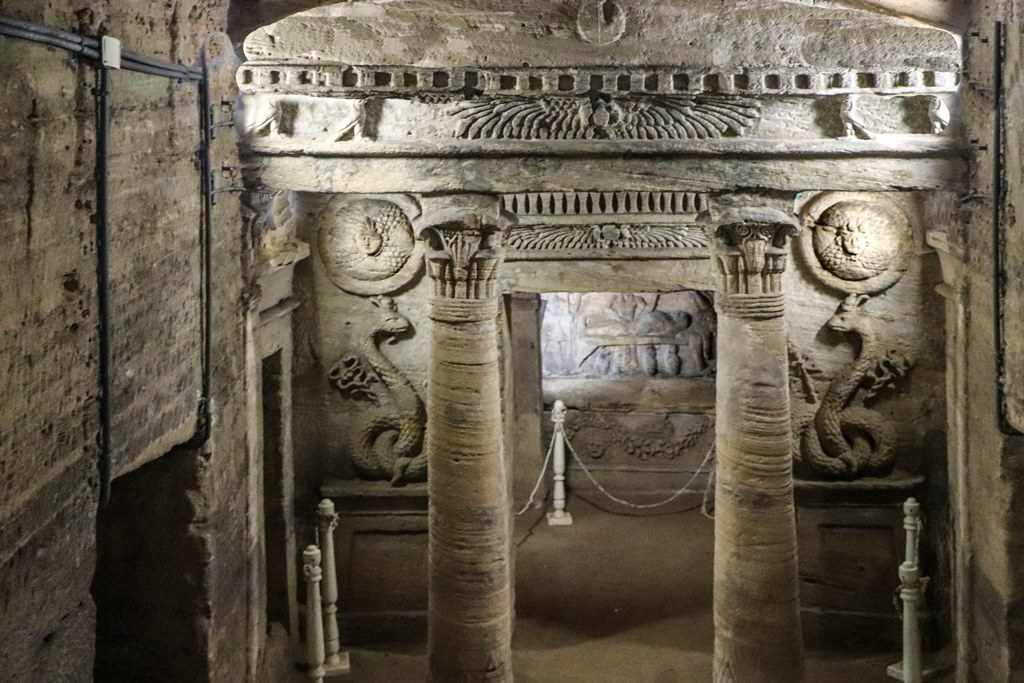
Entrance of the principal tomb chamber

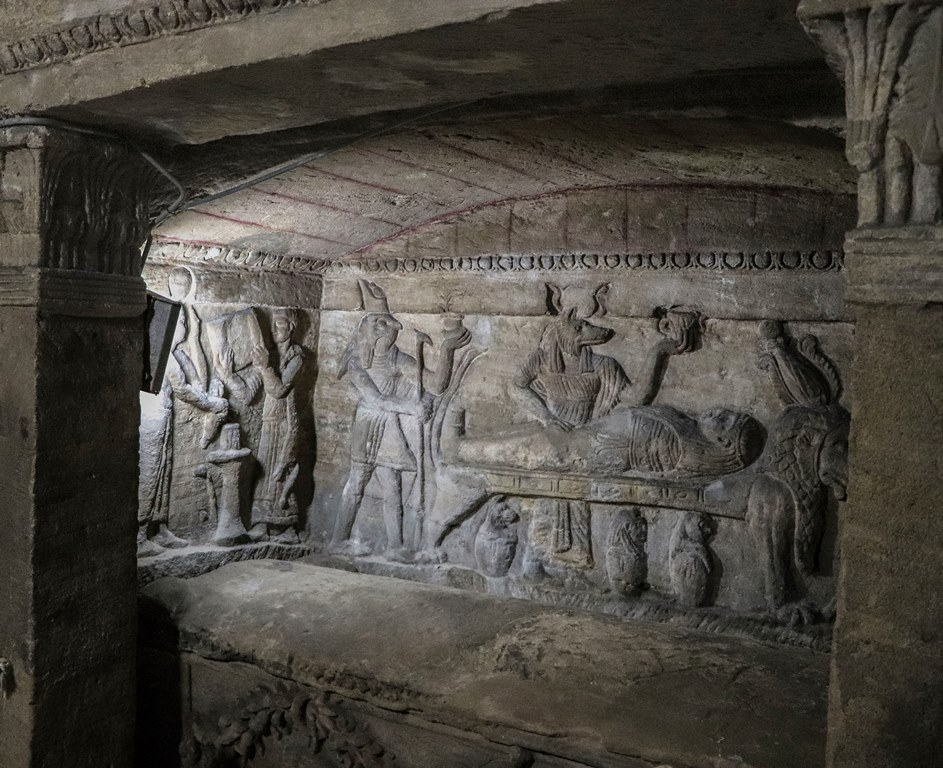
Central panel with Anubis mummifying a body

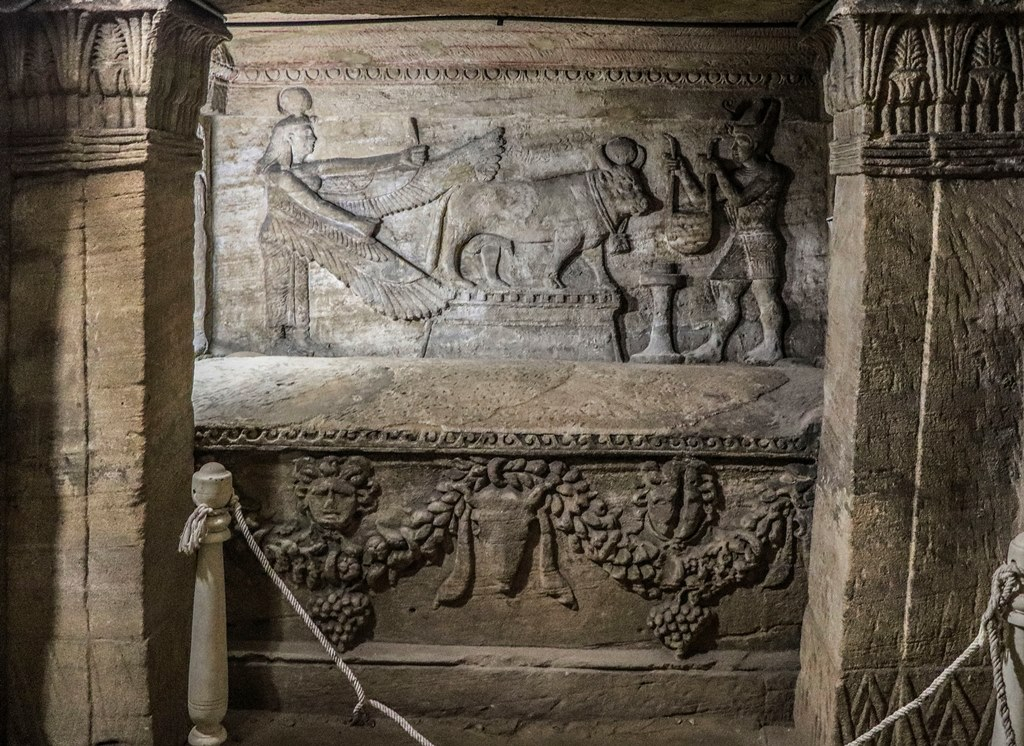
Decorated sarcophagus and panel with Apus-bull
