= Jaime Alvar Ezquerra =

Spanish historian, author and professor (born 1955)

Jaime Alvar Ezquerra (born April 20, 1955) is a Spanish historian, author and professor at the Charles III University of Madrid, specializing in ancient history.

He was born in Granada, studied Geography and History at the Complutense University of Madrid, and later continued his studies at the University of Cologne (1980-1981). He taught at the Complutense University between 1977 and 1996, the year in which he became professor in Huelva. He was a visiting professor at the University of Cambridge in 1999-2000. He has been a professor at the Charles III University of Madrid since 2000. He has been a visiting professor at the University of Tor Vergata (Rome, Italy), Franche-Comté (France) and Potsdam (Germany). He is the older brother of Alfredo Alvar Ezquerra of the Spanish National Research Council and the younger brother of Carlos Alvar Ezquerra, Romanic philologist. Their father was Manuel Alvar Ezquerra, prominent Spanish philologist.

== Areas of research ==
His career has focused on the early history of the Iberian Peninsula Greek and Phoenician colonization in the Mediterranean and Tartessic worlds. He is a recognized authority on Religion in ancient Rome, especially the romanization of oriental gods Mithra, Isis, Serapis, Cybele and Attis, as well as the processes of religious transformation of the indigenous peninsular world in contact with other Mediterranean peoples. He is currently working on the analysis of the construction of history and director of The Julio Caro Baroja Institute of Historiography of the Charles III University of Madrid.

== Publications ==
- De Argantonio a los romanos: la Iberia protohistórica - Madrid: Información e Historia: Temas de Hoy, [1995].
- Cristianismo primitivo y religiones mistéricas - Madrid: Cátedra, [1995].
- La navegación prerromana en la Península Ibérica: colonizadores e indígenas - Madrid: Universidad Complutense, 1981.
- Los pueblos del mar y otros movimientos de pueblos a fines del segundo milenio - Torrejón de Ardoz, Madrid: Akal, D.L. 1989.
- Diccionario de Historia de España y América: Madrid: Espasa, D.L. 2002
- Diccionario de Historia de España: Madrid: Istmo, [2001] (con la colaboración de Ana Isabel Álvarez López)
- Diccionario Espasa mitología universal: Madrid: Espasa, D.L. 2000.
- Entre fenicios y visigodos [2008]

== Scientific Dissemination and Popular Science ==
Alvar participated as advisor on the Prehistory and Early History section in the History of Spain series (Prehistoria e Historia Antigua en la serie Historia de España) produced and broadcast by Spanish TV (Televisión Española) between 2004 and 2005. He participated on the book based on the script of this series as well. He has directed several projects for the publisher Editorial Espasa including dictionaries of Spanish history and is editor of Between Phoenicians and Visigoths, The Ancient history of The Iberian Peninsula (Entre fenicios y visigodos).

== See also ==
- Aion (deity)
- Mithras Liturgy
- Emerita Augusta
- Parabiago plate
- Romanization (cultural)
- Instituto Cervantes
- Ministry of Education (Spain) Departamento de Humanidades: Historia, Geografía y Arte.
- Biblioteca Nacional de España (National Library of Spain)
