= Castellani (goldsmiths) =

Italian family of Goldsmiths

The Castellani were a family of goldsmiths, collectors, antique dealers and potters who created a business "empire" active in Rome during the 18th and 19th centuries.

== History ==
Fortunato Pio Castellani (1794–1865) is regarded as the forefather of the family. In 1814, Fortunato opened his own workshop in Rome. The progenitor specialized in the creation of jewels emulating the ones that then came to light from the necropolis of Etruria, that were found in the excavations of Pompeii and Herculaneum or that could be observed in the Campana collection. Initiating a partnership with Duke Michelangelo Caetani, a lover of fine arts and a designer of jewels himself, allowed Fortunato Castellani to quickly work for the most illustrious aristocratic families, initially Roman and at a later date even European. Fortunato also imported luxurious goldsmith works from the rest of Europe to be resold in Rome.

Fortunato had three sons. His sons Augusto and Alessandro worked with their father and continued their activities as goldsmiths and antiquarian; his third son, Guglielmo, instead devoted himself to the art of ceramics. Fortunato Pio retired in 1850. The Castellani of the second generation devoted themselves only to the trade of jewels of their own production or to the sale of archaeological finds. The creative part was entrusted to Alessandro Castellani and Michelangelo Caetani, while Augusto was mainly interested in the financial aspects of the company. In 1859, the Castellani devoted themselves for five months to the restoration and cataloguing of the Campana Collection; they thus had the opportunity to refine their observations on the technique of granulation and filigree and to finally achieve an acceptable reproduction of them.

During the second half of the 19th century, the Castellani goldsmiths had a leading role in the European market. Alessandro, who had fled to France for political reasons in 1860, opened with great success new locations in Paris and Naples in which antiquities, mainly of Etruscan origin, were traded. Carlo Giuliano, a protégé of Alessandro Castellani, managed Castellani's London branch in the 1860s. His early works prominently featured Castellani-inspired designs and techniques, such as plique-à-jour enamel and granulation. Clients included Napoleon III, the Louvre Museum and the British Museum, directed by Sir Isaac Newton. It has been hypothesized that some Etruscan finds traded by the Castellani were imitations. Recent chemical analyses on some antiquarian finds sold by the Castellani to the Berlin Museum have confirmed that Alessandro Castellani sometimes also sold false finds.

In 1981, Geoffrey Munn, a jewelry historian, published an article in The Connoisseur magazine examining the Castellani family's revival of ancient goldsmithing techniques. The article highlighted their use of granulation and mosaic work, inspired by archaeological discoveries and antique collections.

When Alessandro died in 1883, his brother Augusto transformed the shop into a private museum. The trading activity continued with the nephews Alfredo and Torquato, sons of Augusto and Alessandro respectively; the first was a goldsmith, the second a ceramist. Their deaths, which occurred in the 1930s, coincided with the end of the family's trading activity.

== Family members ==
- Fortunato Pio Castellani (1794–1865) - the progenitor, goldsmith, antiquarian
- Alessandro Castellani (1823–1883) - son of Fortunato, patriot in favour of Mazzini, goldsmith, antiquarian
- Augusto Castellani (1829–1914) - son of Fortunato, goldsmith, antiquarian, collector
- Guglielmo Castellani (1836–1896) - son of Fortunato, ceramist
- Torquato Castellani (1846–1931) - son of Alessandro, ceramist
- Olga Castellani (1879–1965) - daughter of Torquato, ceramist
- Pio Fabri (1847–1927) - son-in-law of Augustus, ceramist
- Alfredo Castellani (1856–1930) - son of Augustus, goldsmith and restorer

== Castellani jewellery collection ==
The Castellani have preserved and donated to the Italian State the jewels they created during their centenary activity that remained in their possession. These jewels are now exhibited in the National Museum of Villa Giulia. Augustus, who had donated a large collection of rare pieces to the Capitoline Museums and the Artistic-Industrial Museum of Rome, left his collection of Greek, Italiot and Etruscan vases, bronzes, ivories, jewels and coins to his son Alfredo on his death. Alfredo, the last male descendant of the Castellani, donated almost all of the collection to the Italian State with only two exceptions: a gospel blanket in gold, sapphires, pearls and ivory, and a votive crown in gold, pearls and rubies left, by testamentary will, to St. Peter's Basilica in the Vatican City, where they are exhibited at the Basilica's Treasure Museum.

== Gallery ==
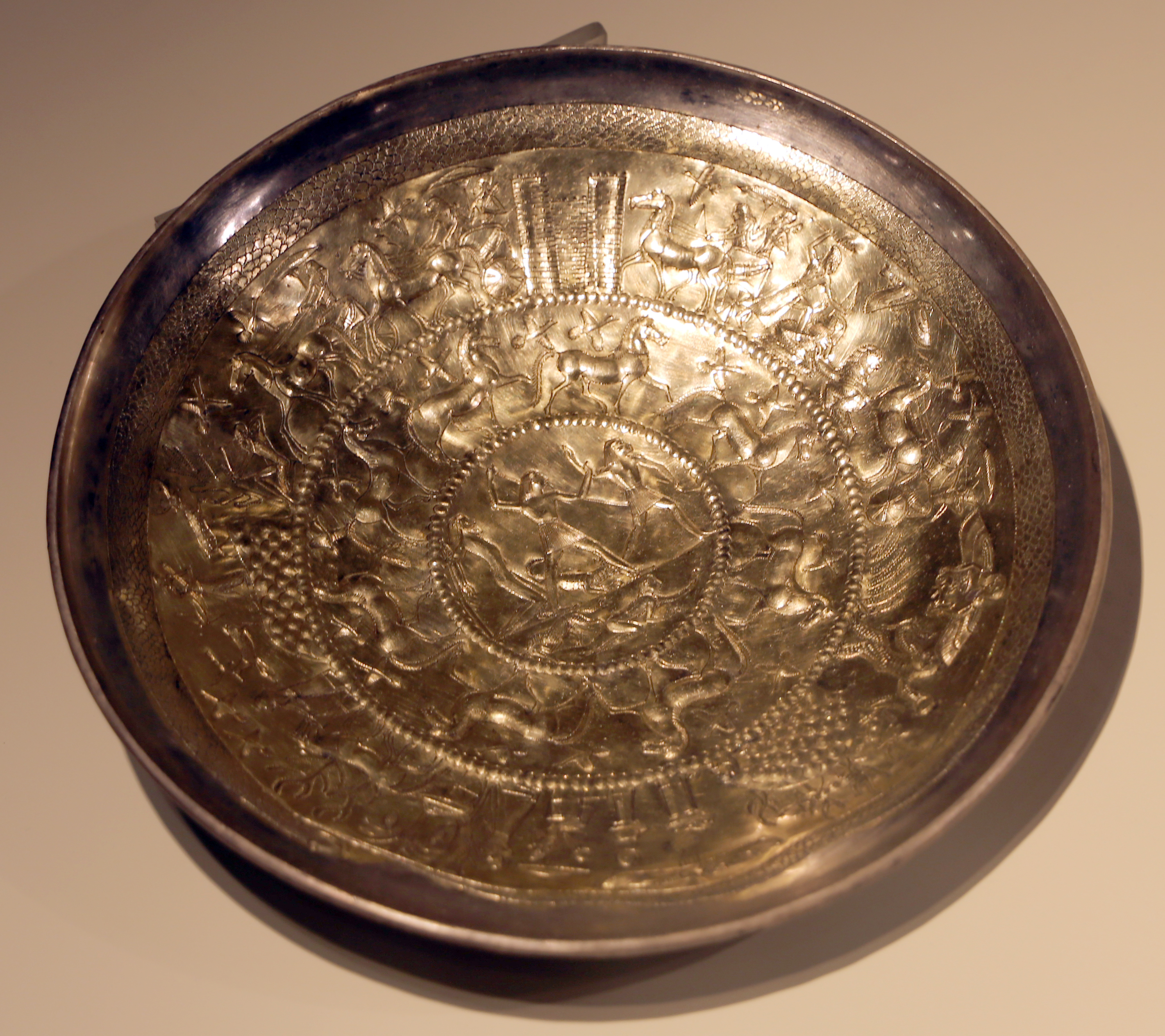
Phoenician craftsmen, patera in silver and gold with the king's hunting day, c. 675-650 BC, from Bernardini's tomb in the necr. of the colombella in palestrina

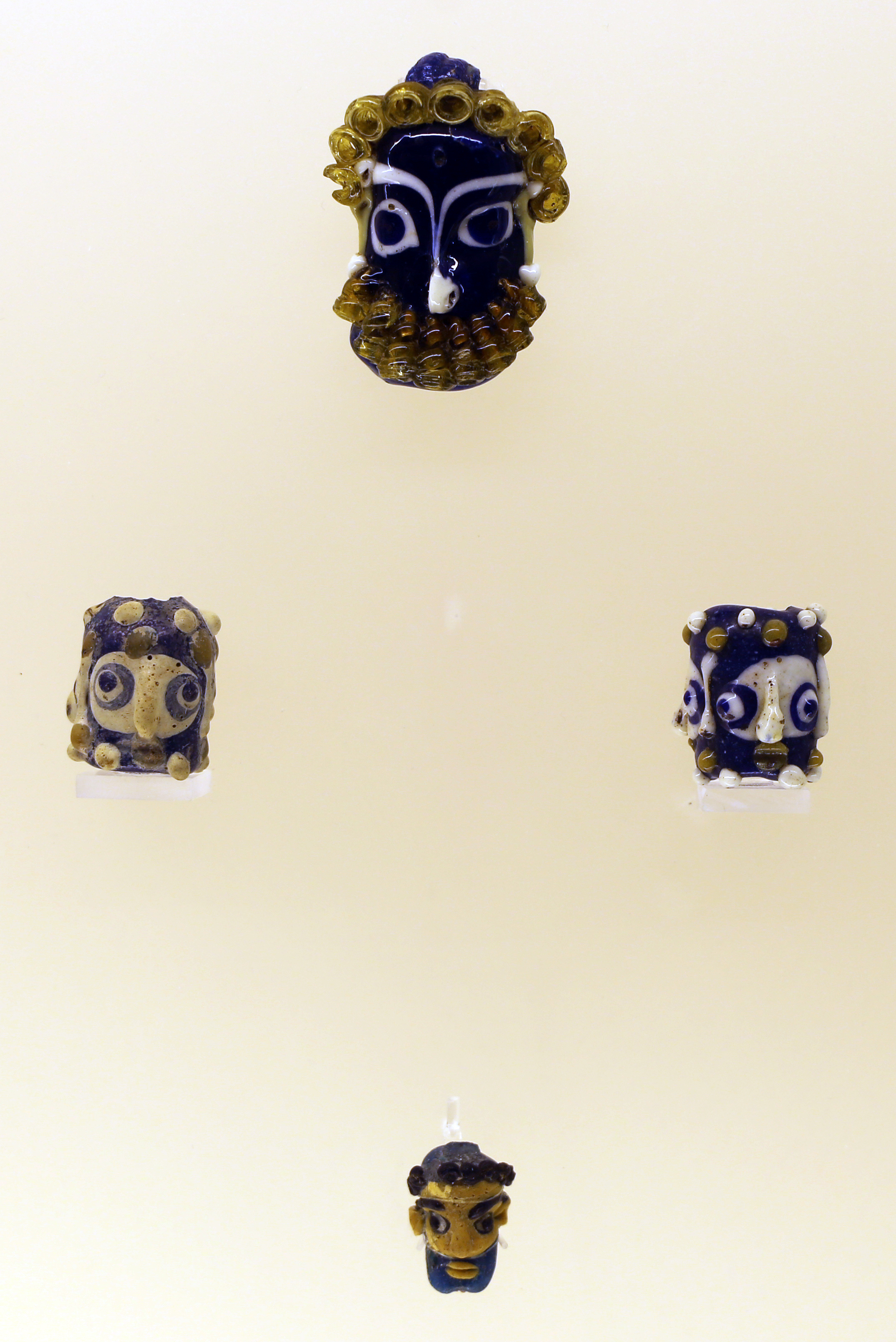
Carthage, corsair-headed pendants in glass paste, 510-250 BC ca.

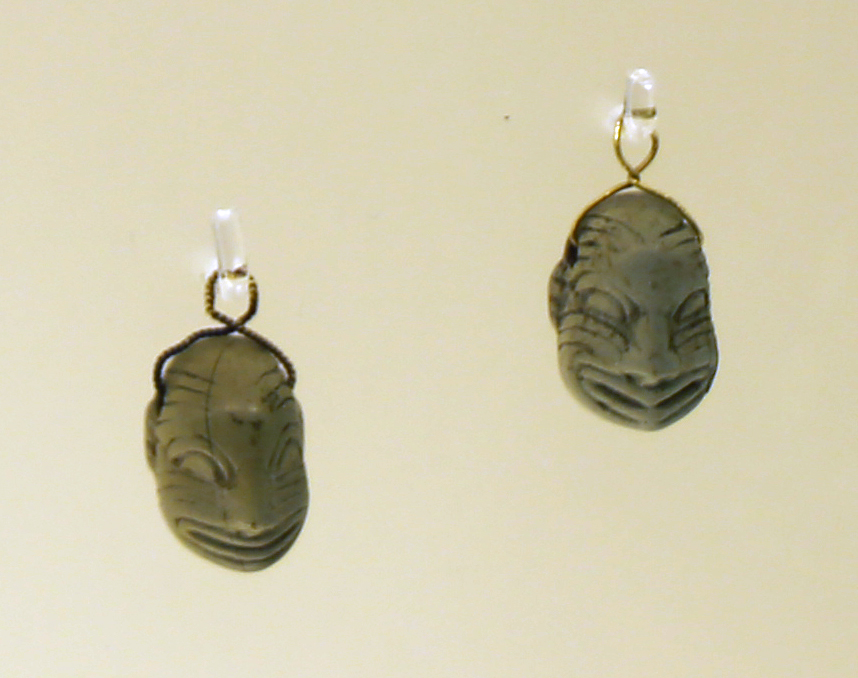
Carthage, faience corsair head pendants, c. 510-250 BC

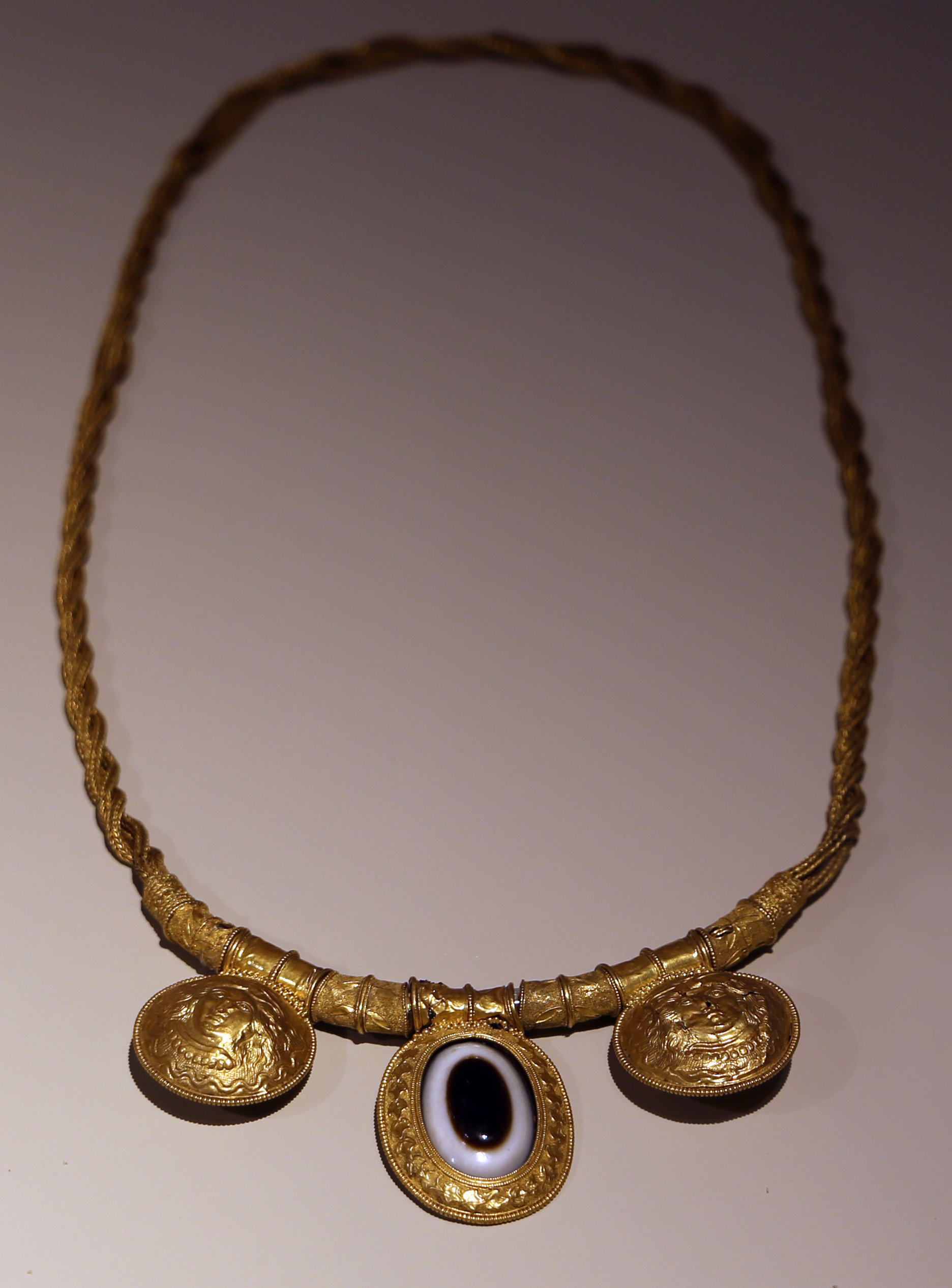
Gold necklace with bulle, 310-290 BC, from the tomb of gold in the necr. of the fishpond in todi

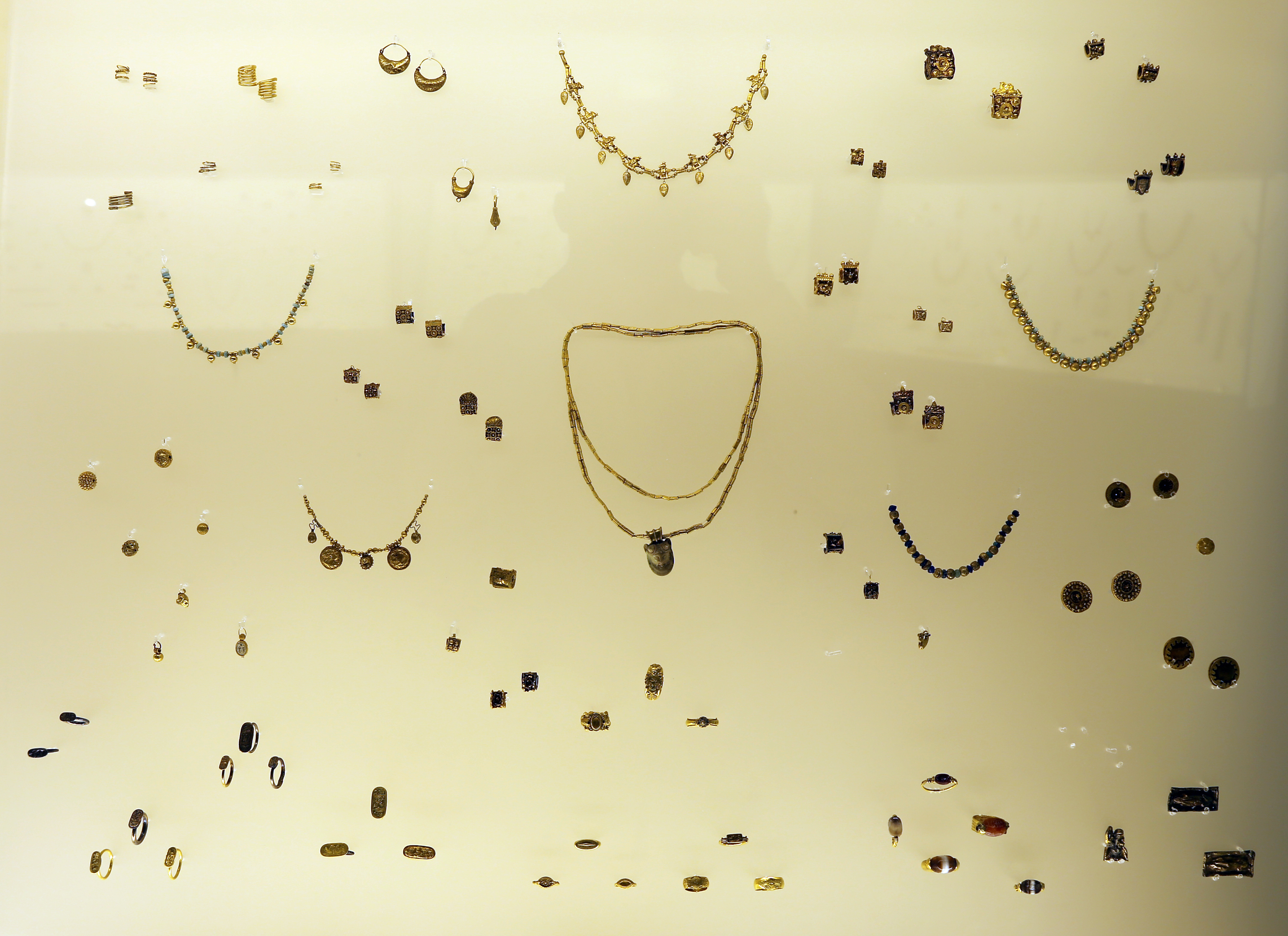
Etruria, goldsmiths from the Archaic period, 6th century BC, 01

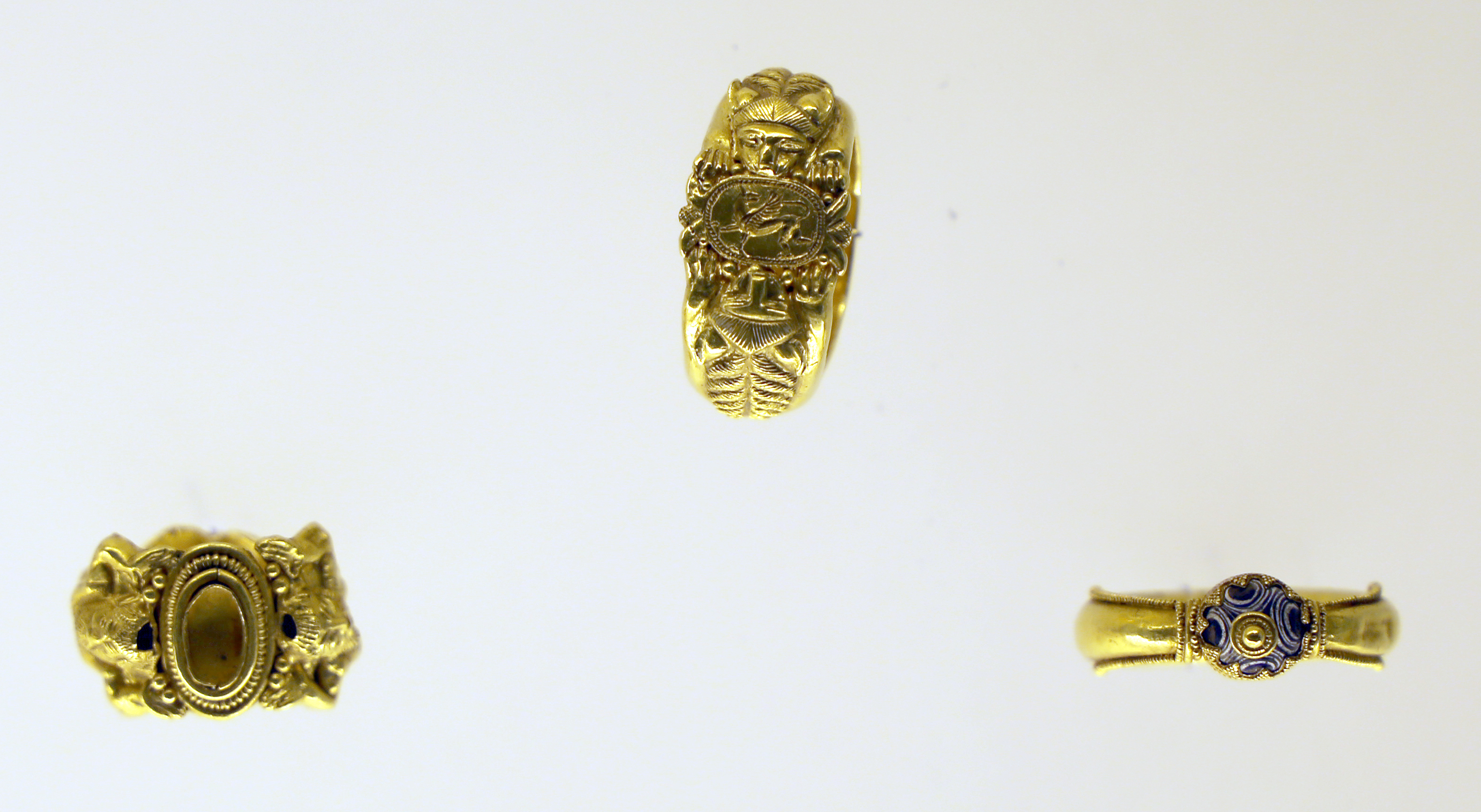
Etruria, goldsmiths from the Archaic period, 6th century BC, rings 01

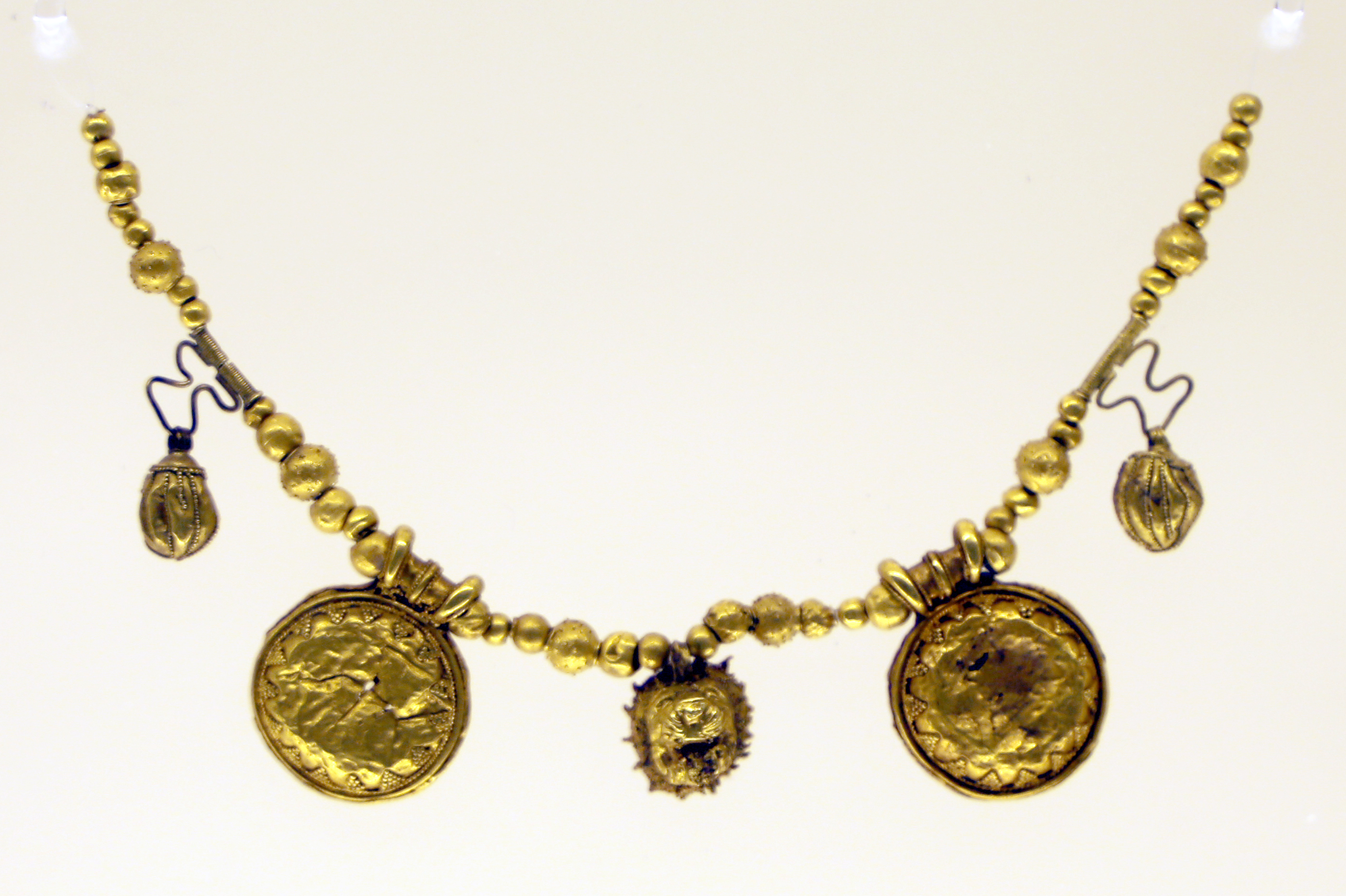
Etruria, goldsmiths from the archaic period, 6th century BC, necklace with bulla pendants and more

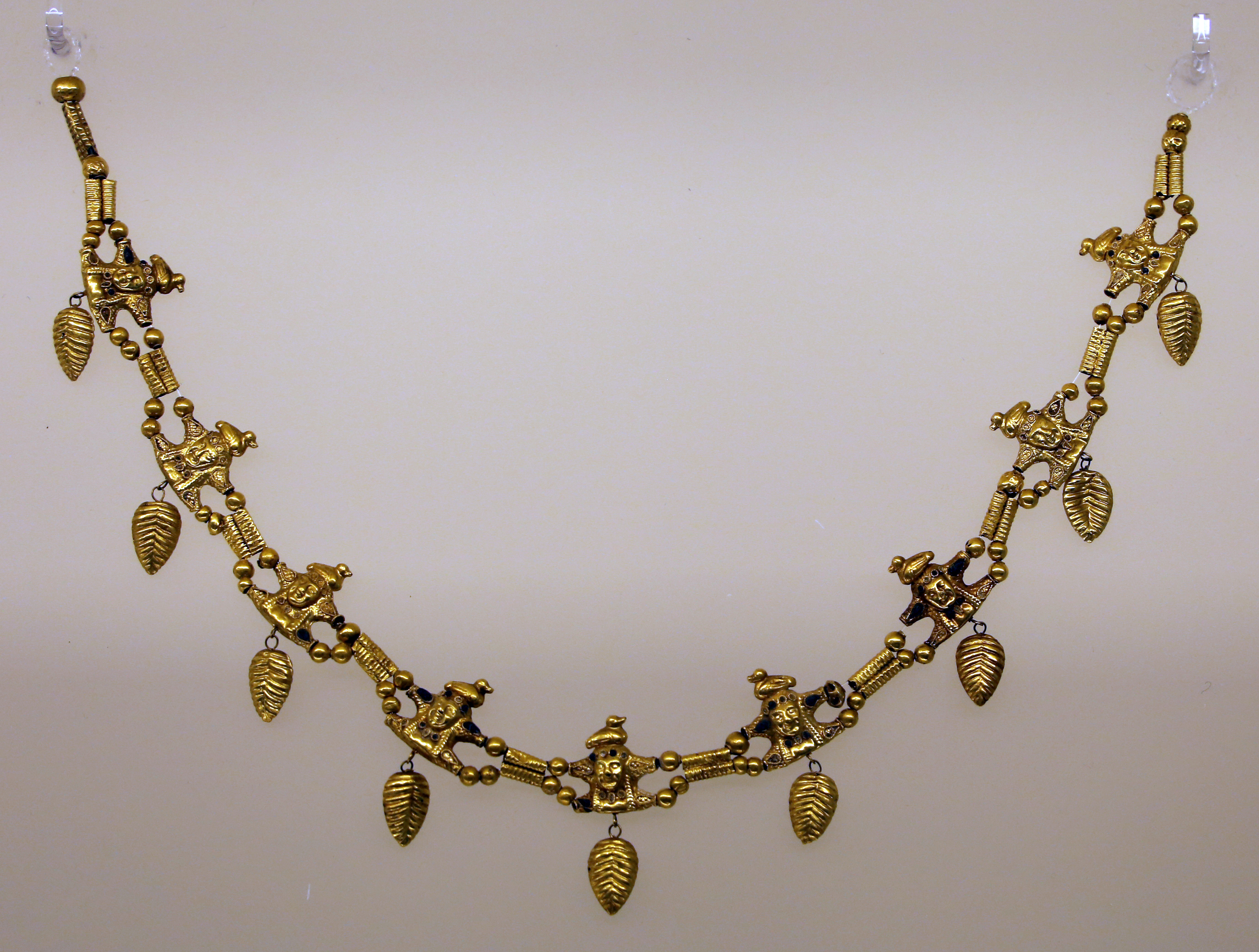
Etruria, goldsmiths from the Archaic period, 6th century BC, necklace with pine cone pendants

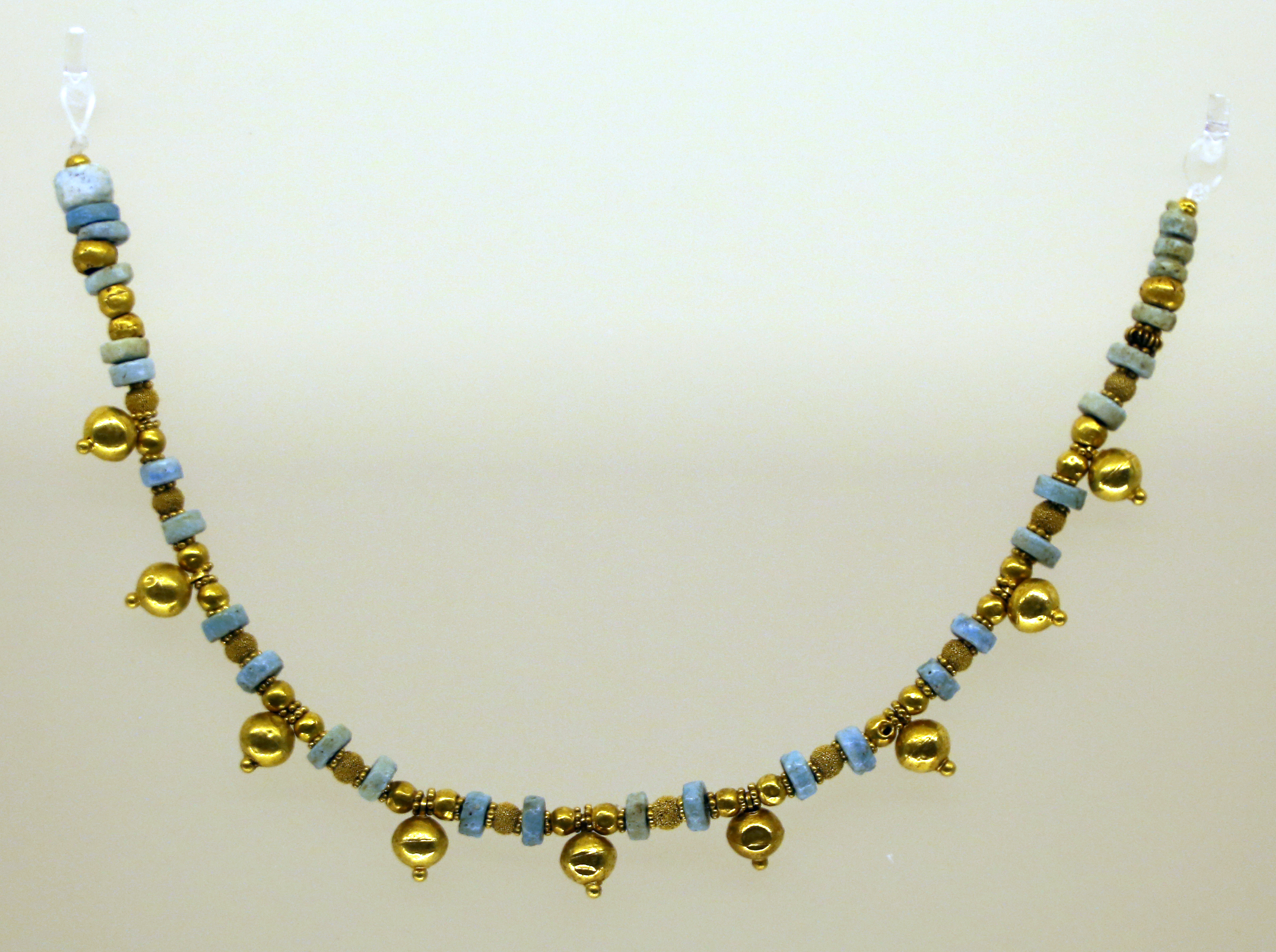
Etruria, goldsmiths from the archaic period, 6th century BC, gold and faience necklace

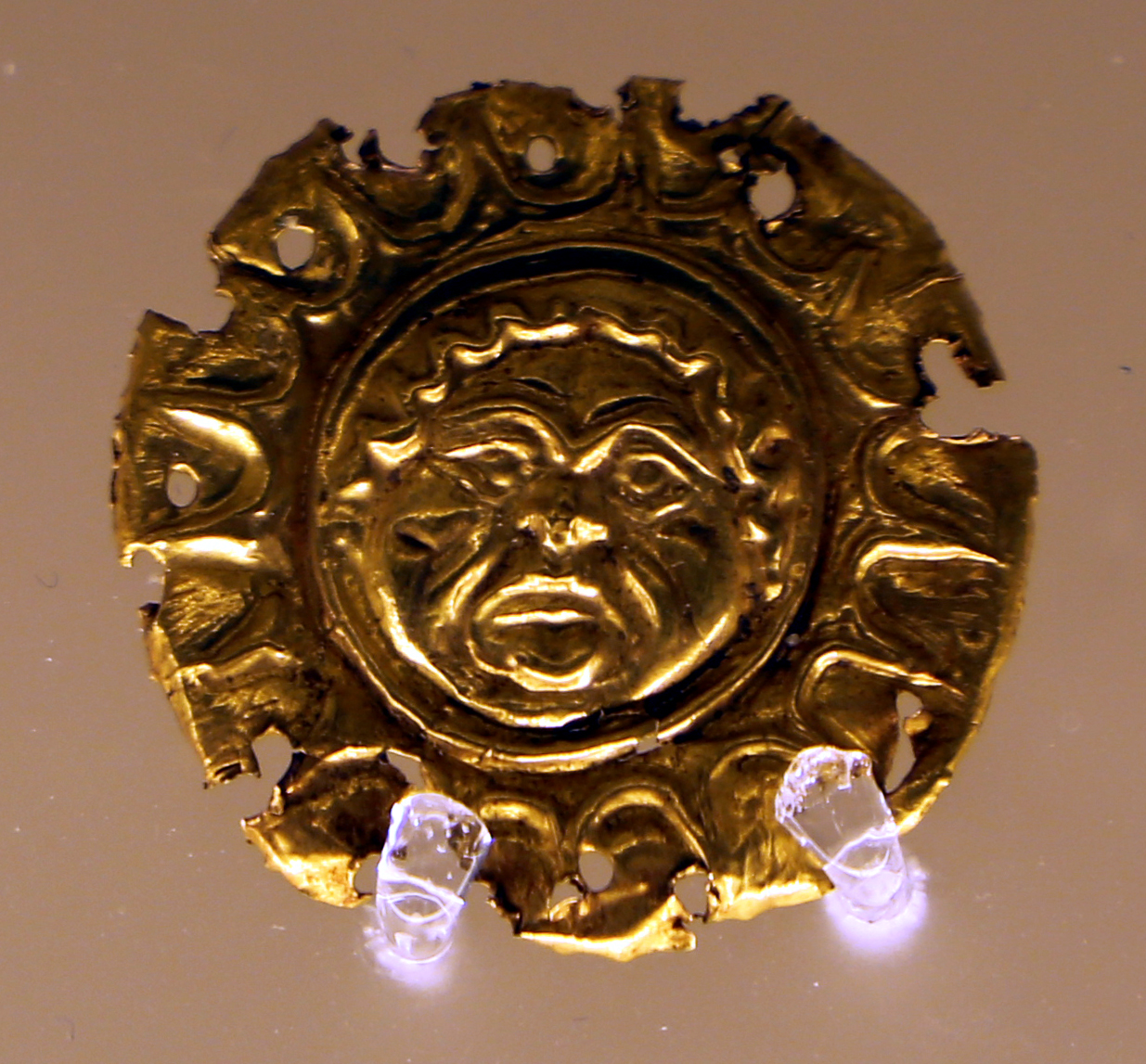
Etruria, goldsmiths from the Archaic period, 6th century BC, disc fibula with gorgoneion

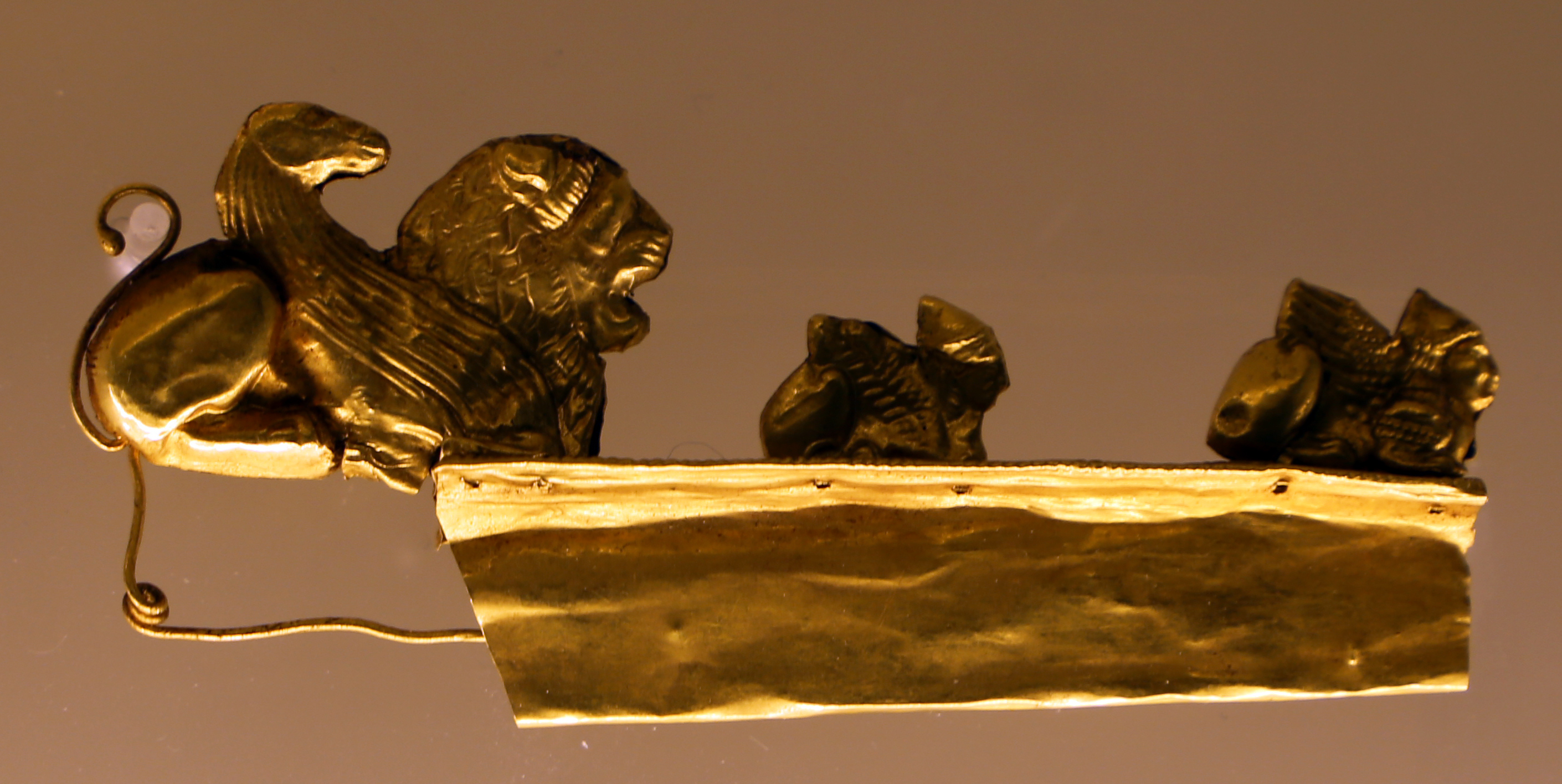
Etruria, goldsmiths from the Archaic period, 6th century BC, stirrup fibula with leonine protomes 02

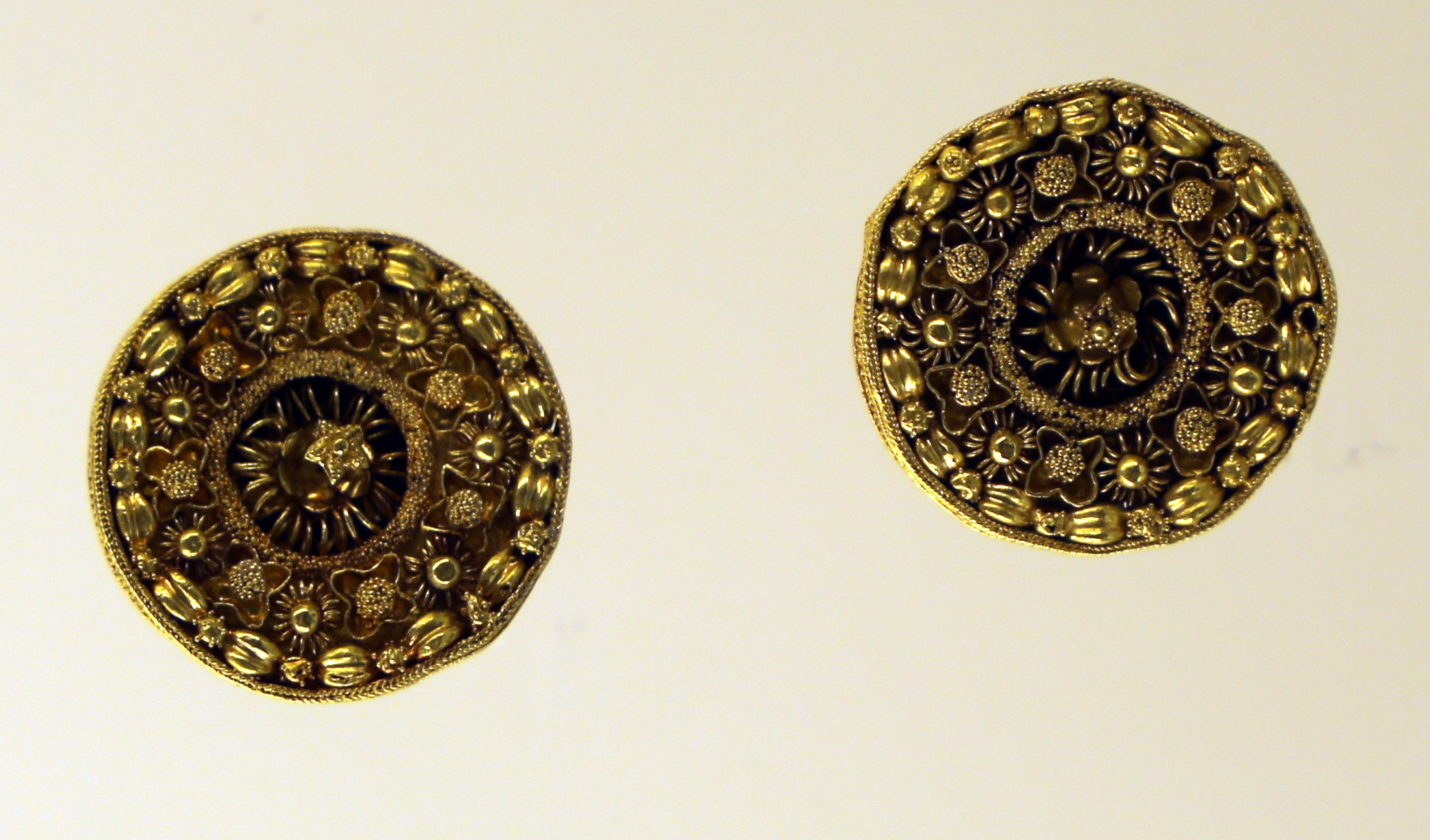
Etruria, goldsmiths from the Archaic period, 6th century BC, disc fibulae with granulation decoration

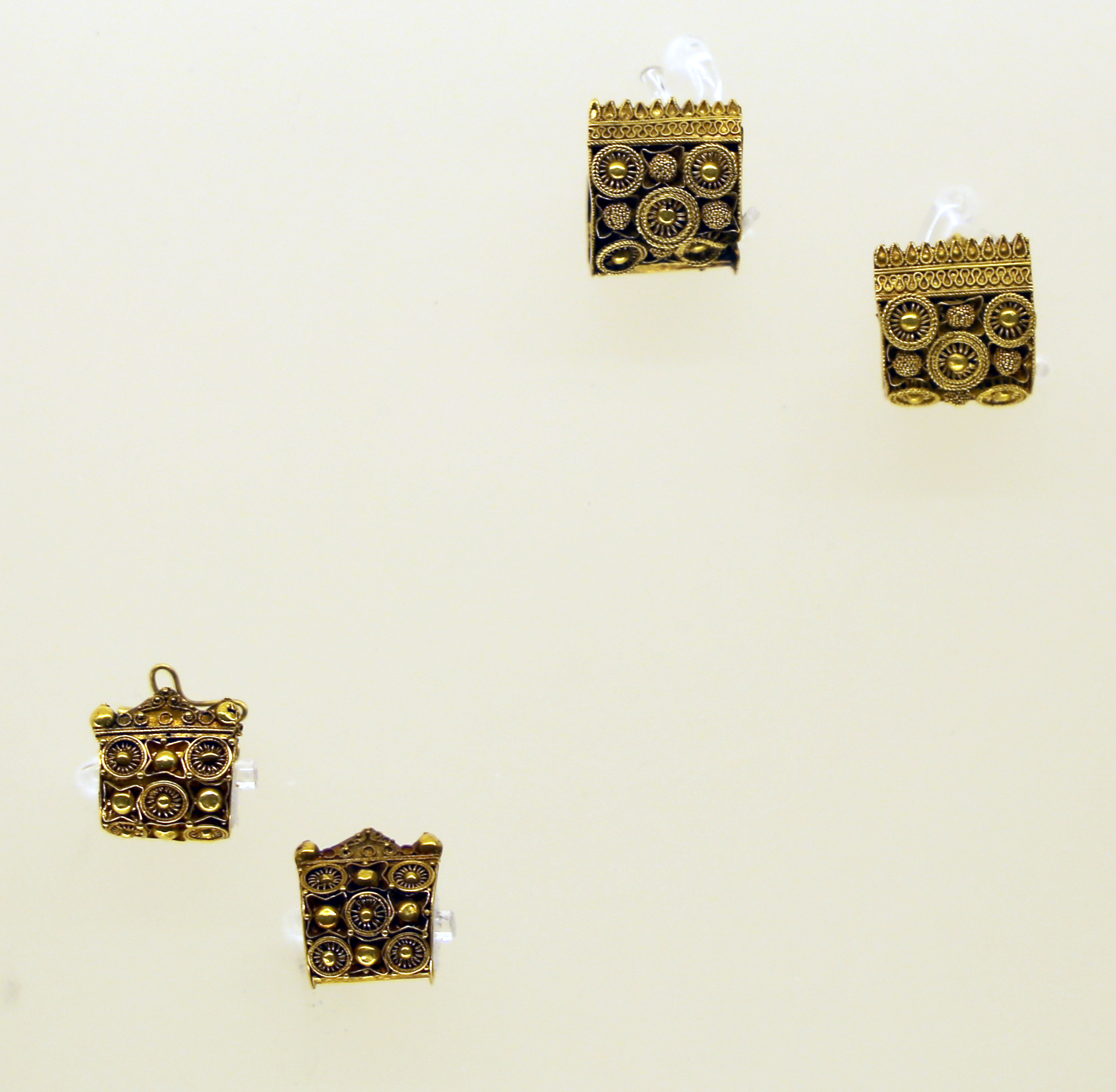
Etruria, goldsmiths from the archaic period, 6th century BC, box earrings 01

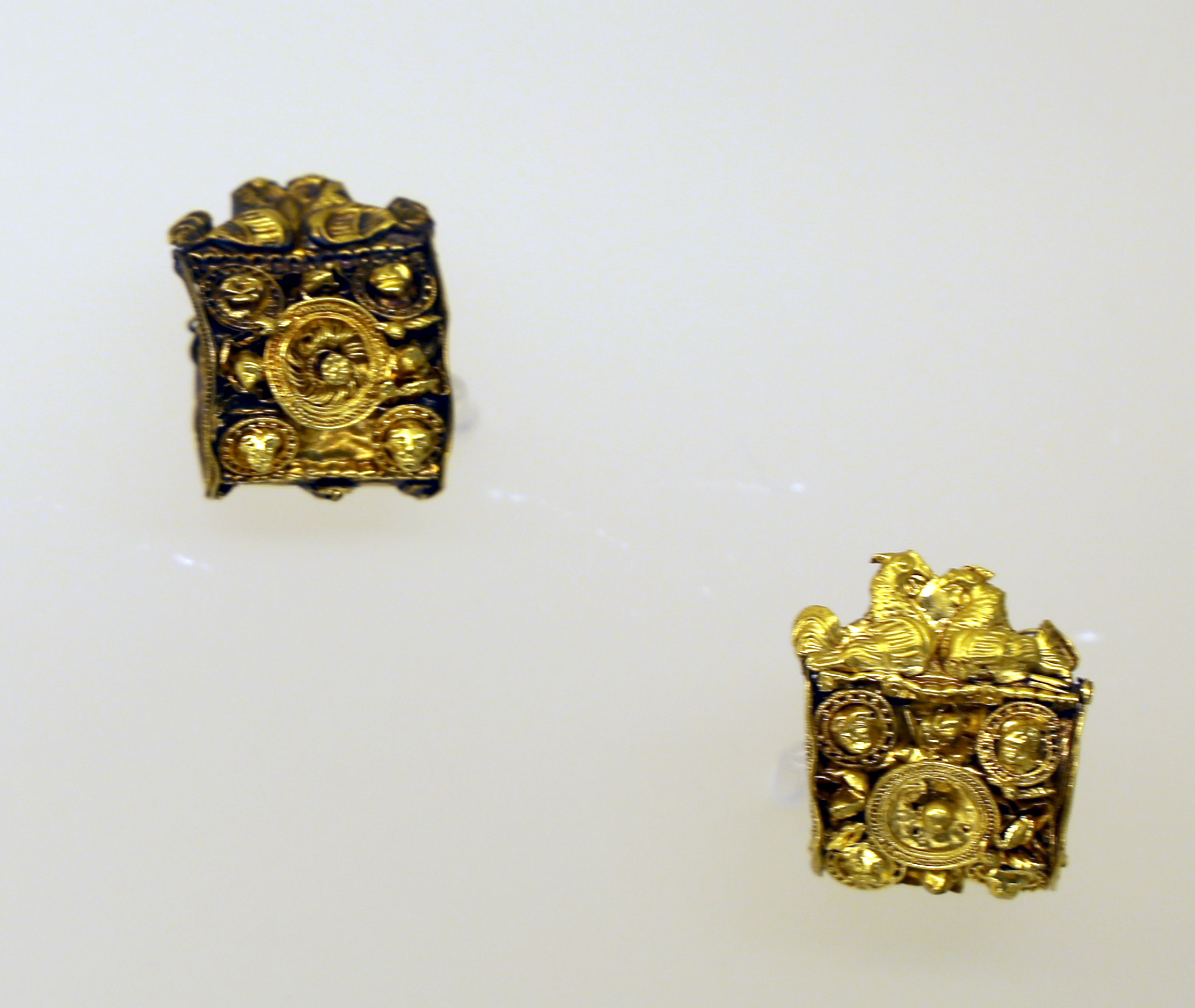
Etruria, goldsmiths from the archaic period, 6th century BC, box earrings 02

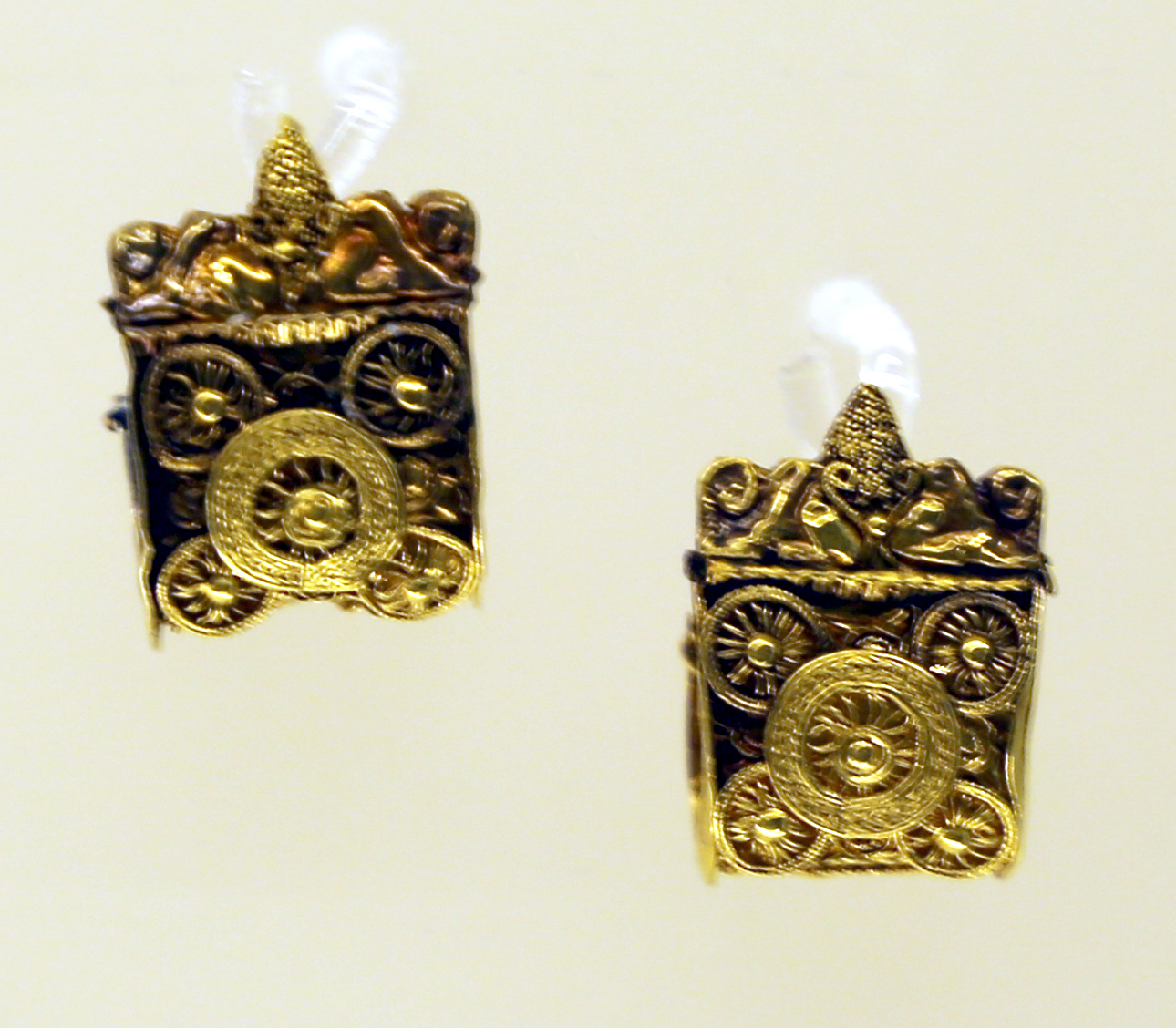
Etruria, goldsmiths from the archaic period, 6th century BC, box earrings 03

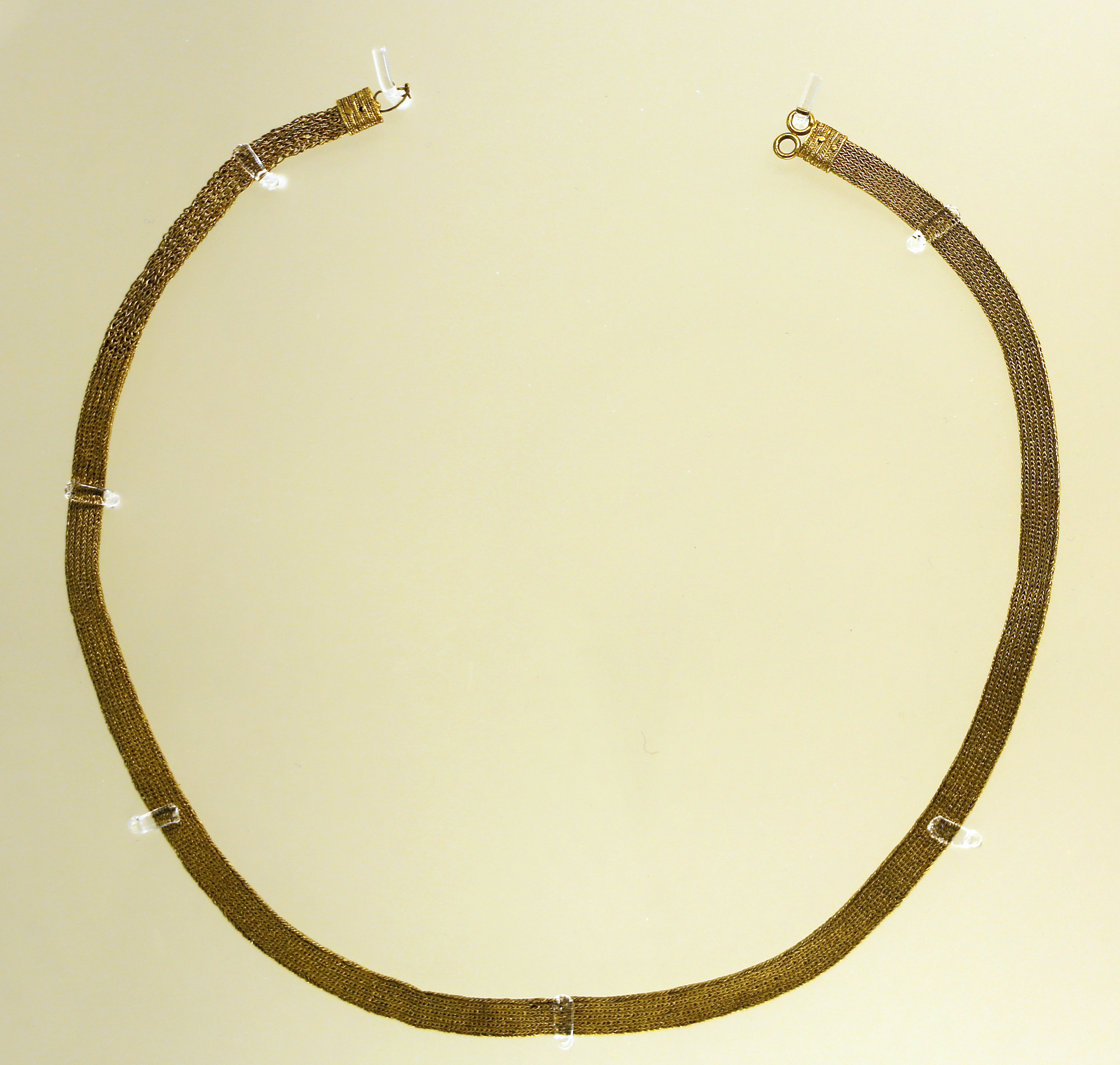
Etruria, goldsmiths of the classical and late classical period, 4th-2nd century BC, knitted necklace

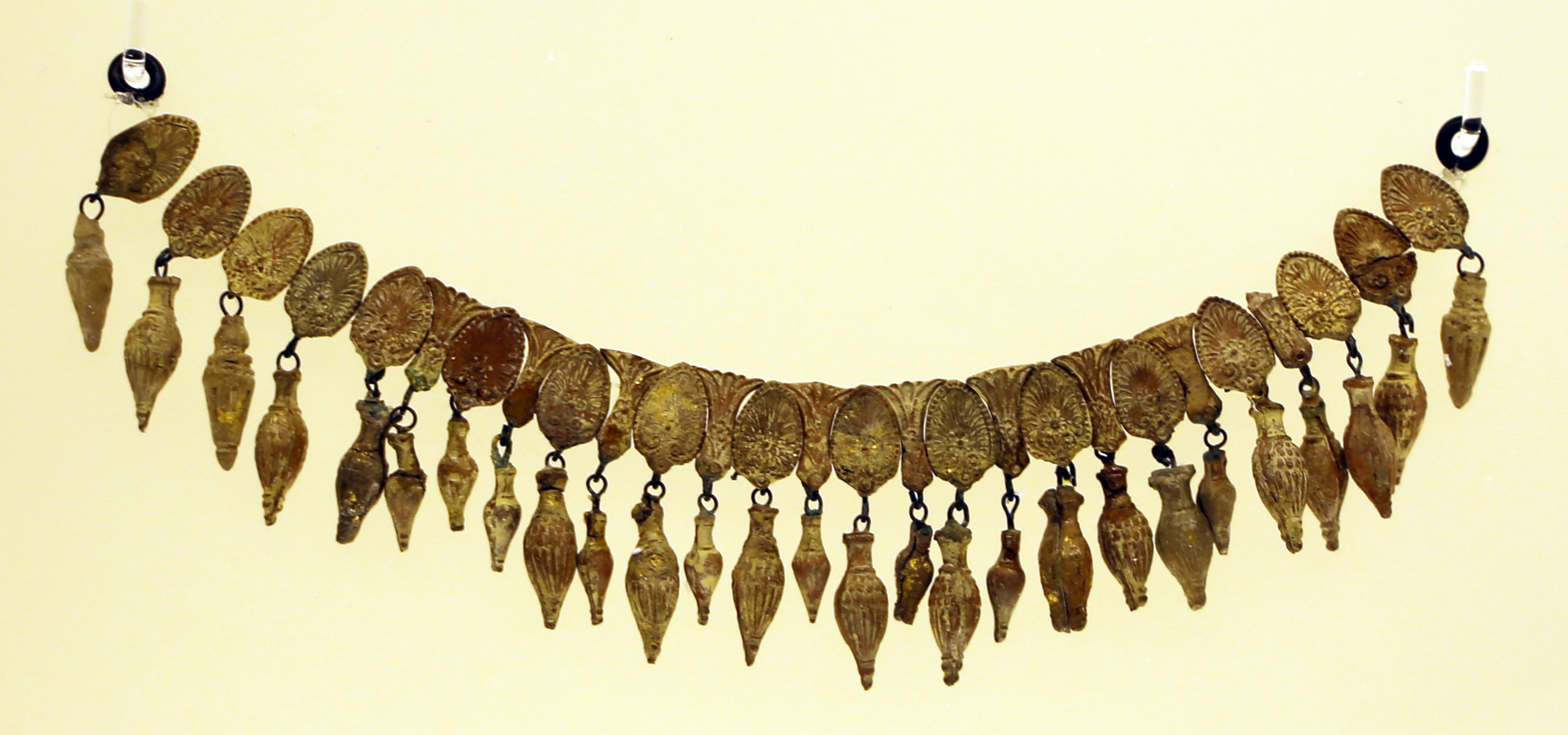
Etruria, classical and late classical goldsmiths, 4th-2nd century BC, palmette necklace with amphora pendants, from cerveteri (gilded terracotta)

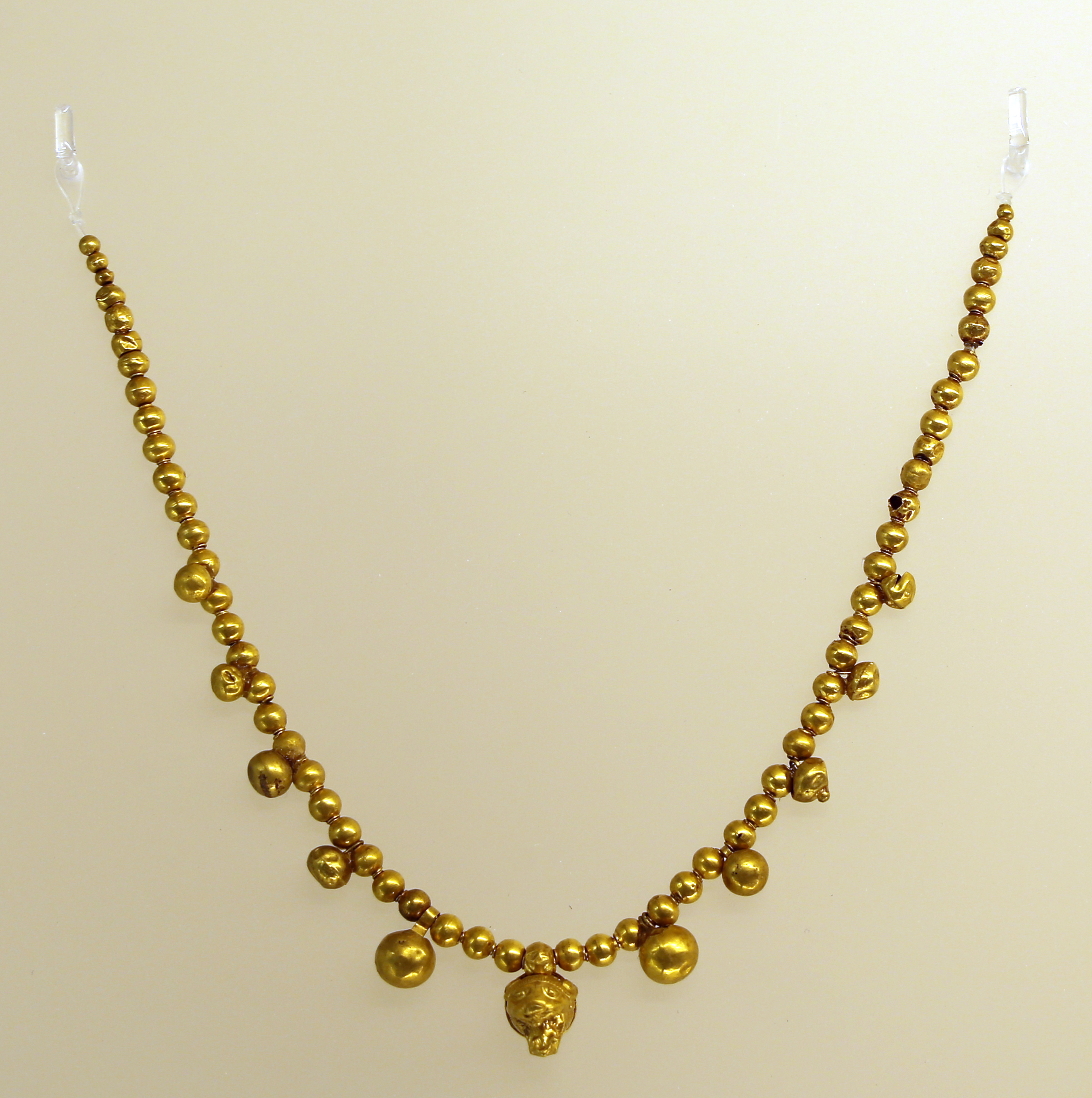
Etruria, goldsmiths of the classical and late classical period, 4th-2nd century BC, necklace with small spheres

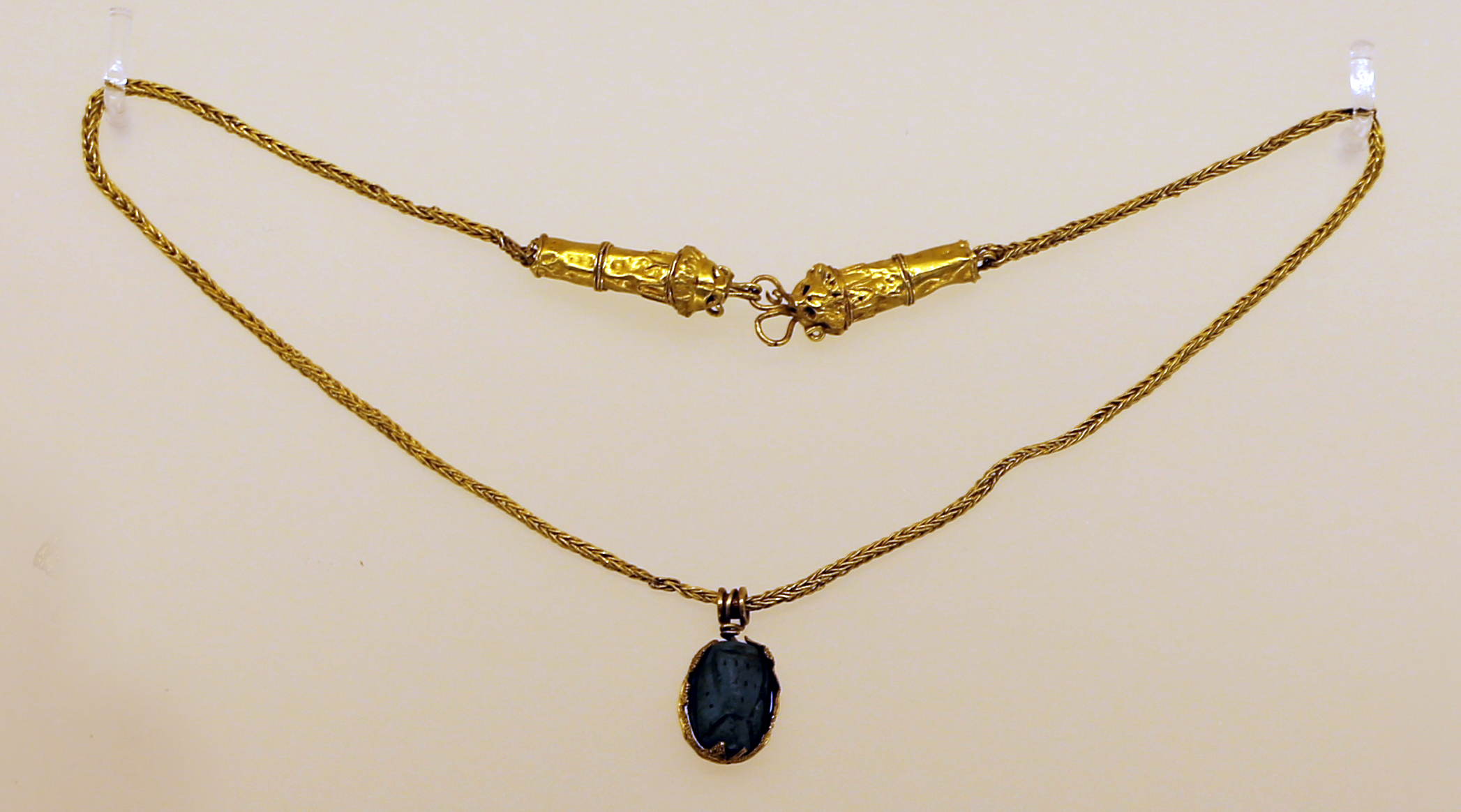
Etruria, goldsmiths of the classical and late classical period, 4th-2nd century BC, necklace with clasp with protomes

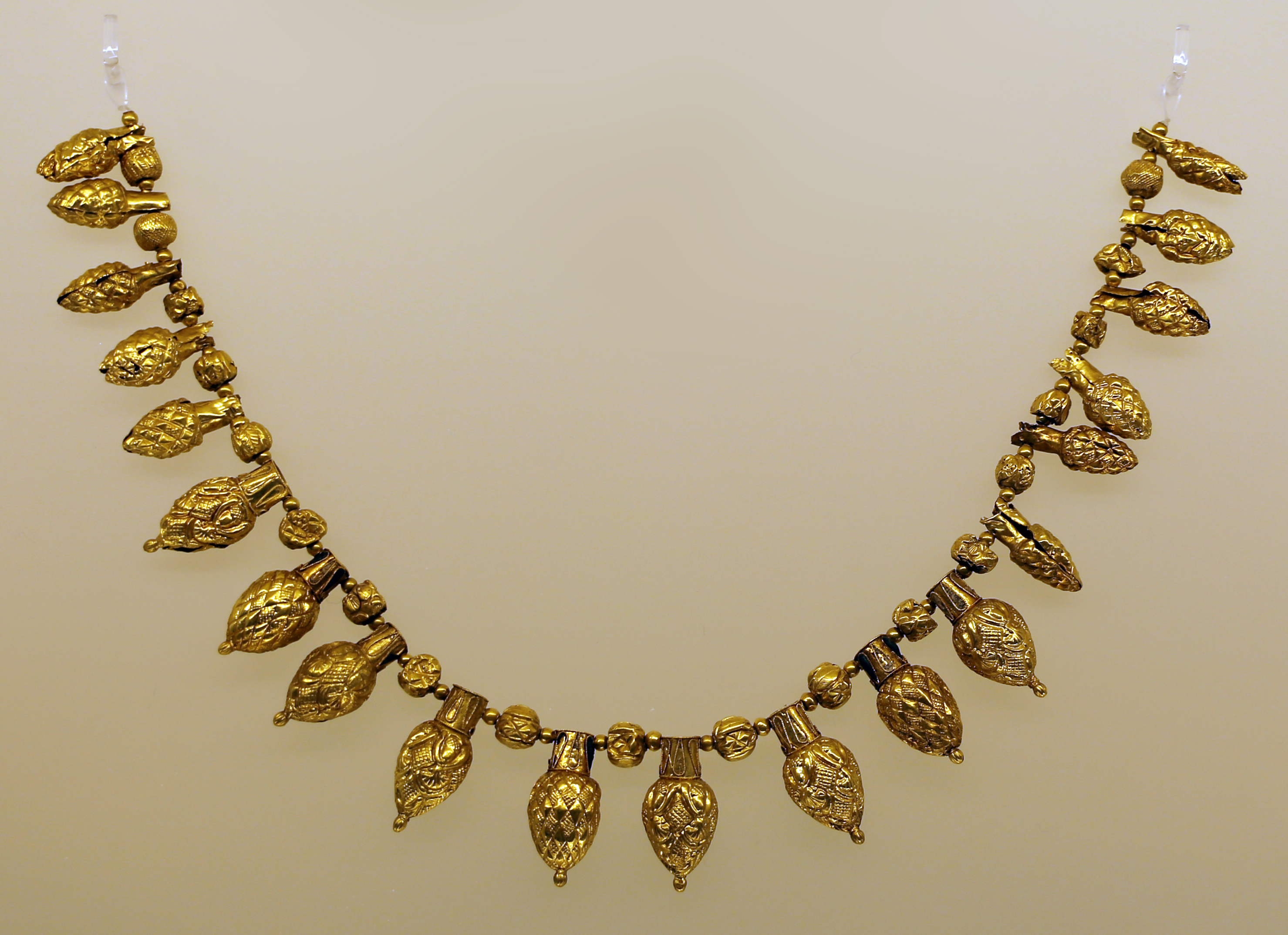
Etruria, classical and late classical goldsmiths, 4th-2nd century BC, necklace with acorn pendant clasp

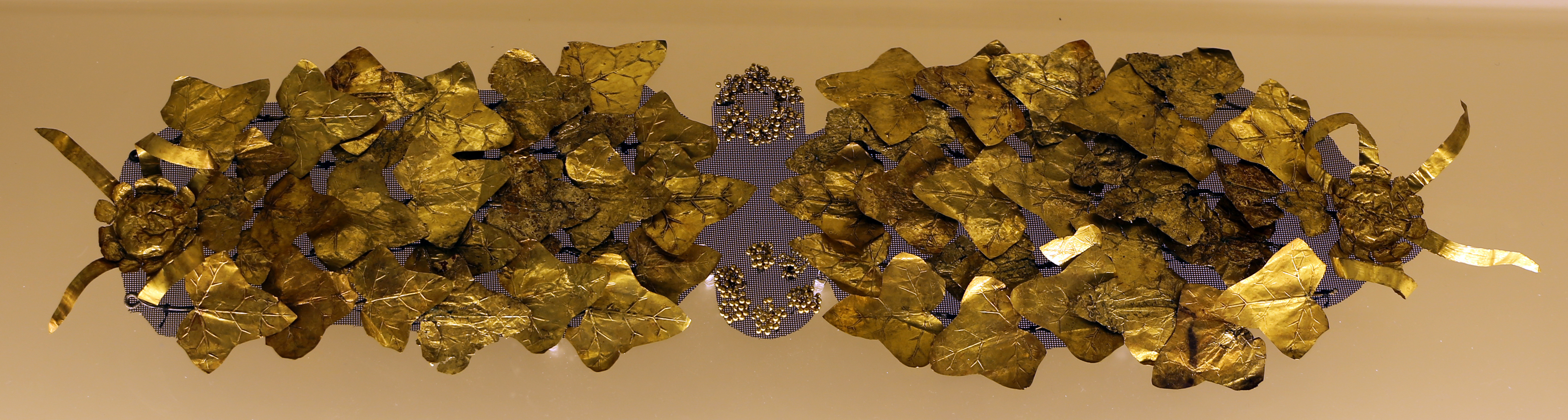
Etruria, classical and late classical goldsmiths, 4th-2nd century BC, ivy-leaf crown

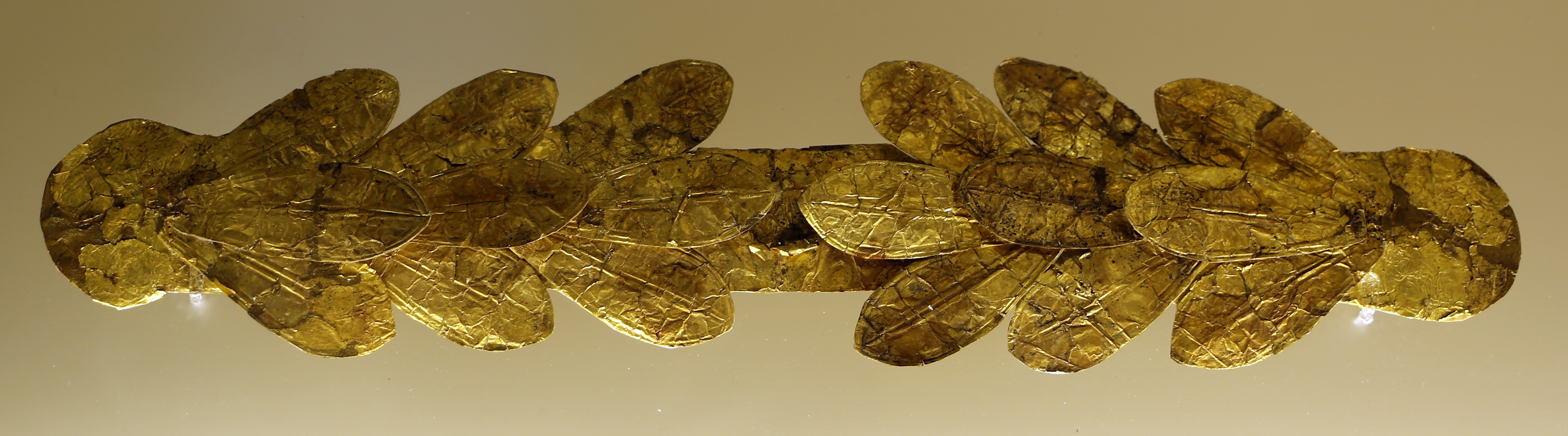
Etruria, goldsmiths of the classical and late classical period, 4th-2nd century BC, crown with lanceolate leaves

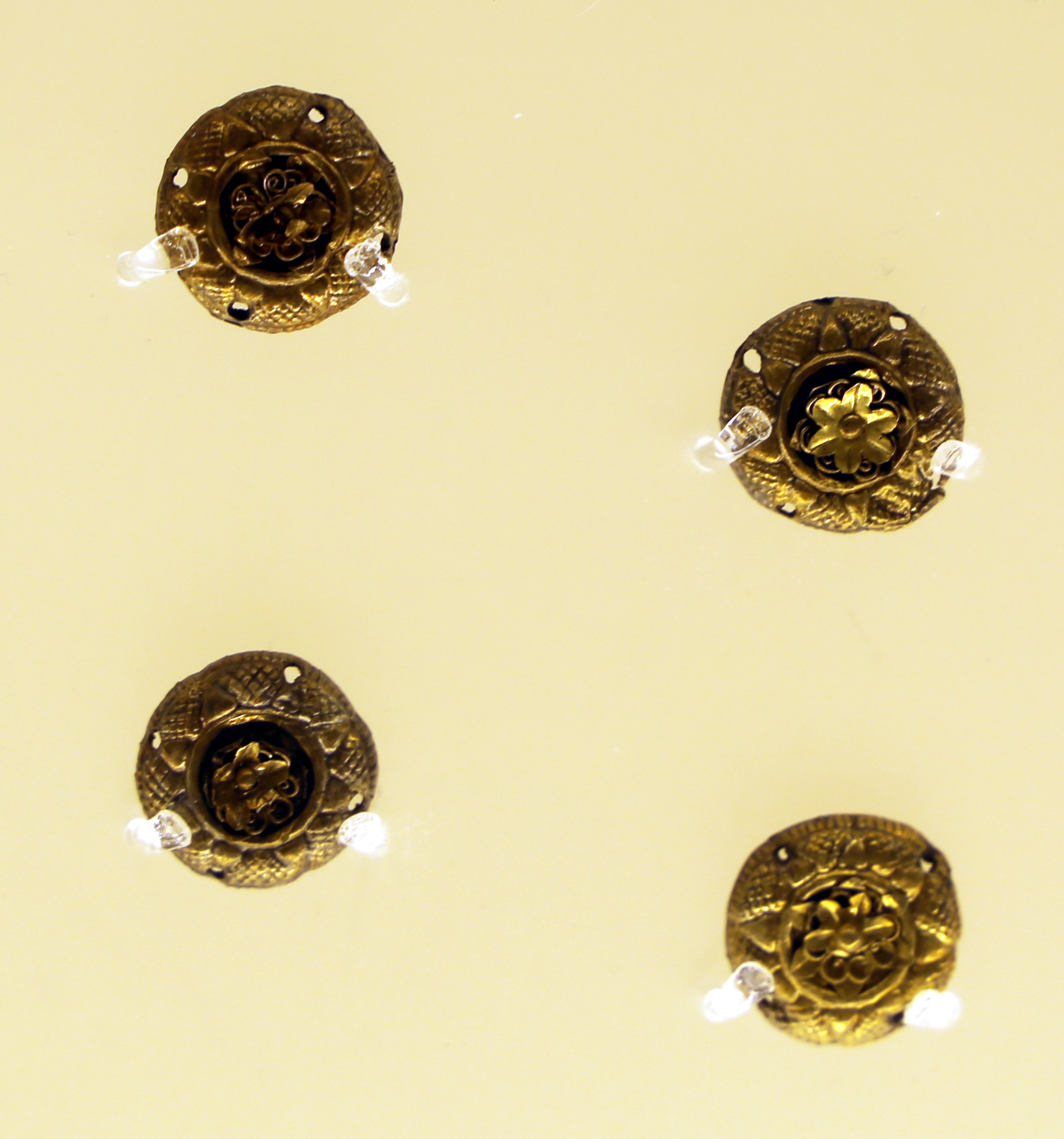
Etruria, goldsmiths of the classical and late classical period, 4th-2nd century BC, circular rosette decorations

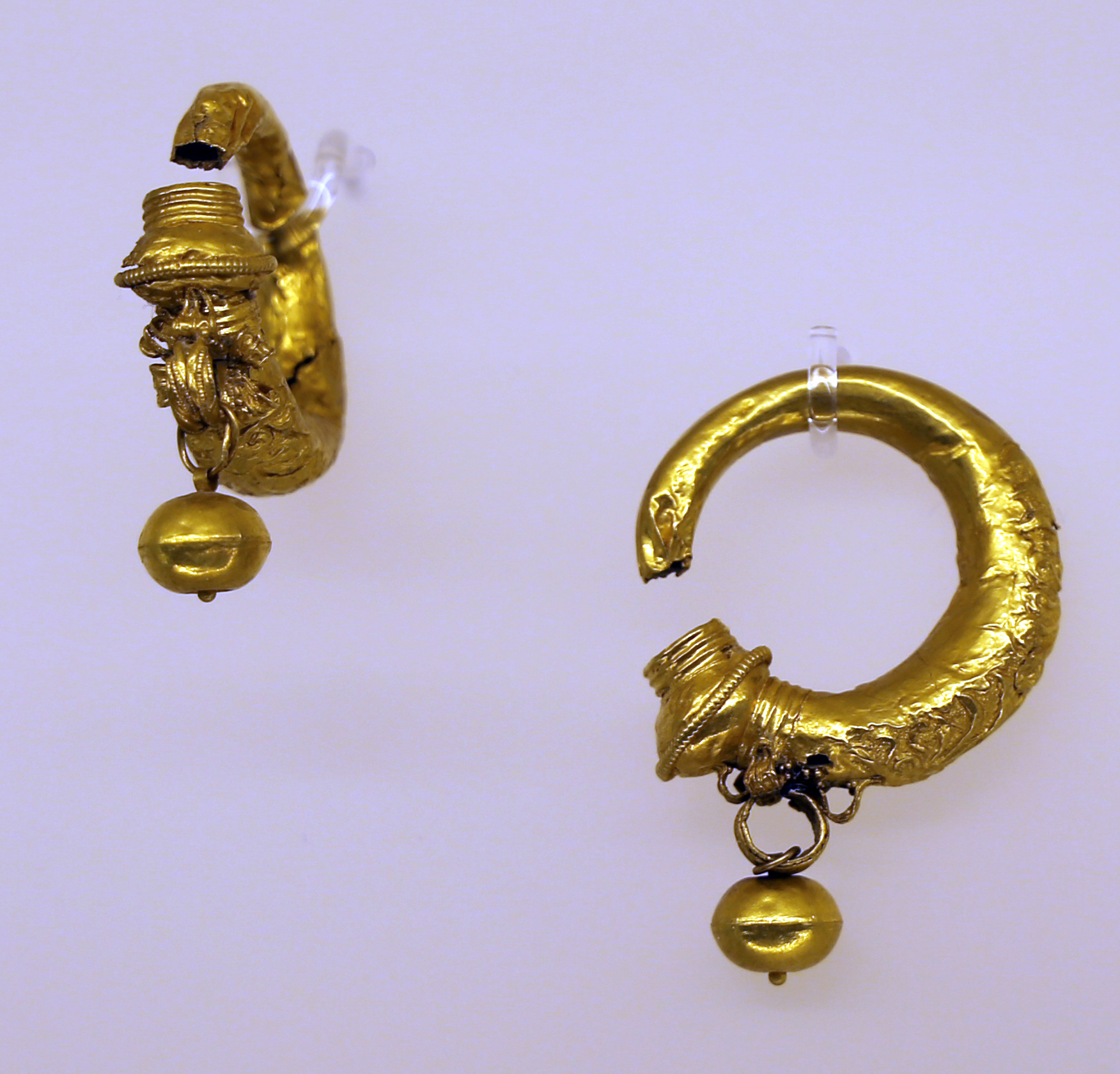
Etruria, oreficerie del periodo classico e tardo classico, IV-II secolo ac., orecchini a cornucopia, da ruvo di puglia

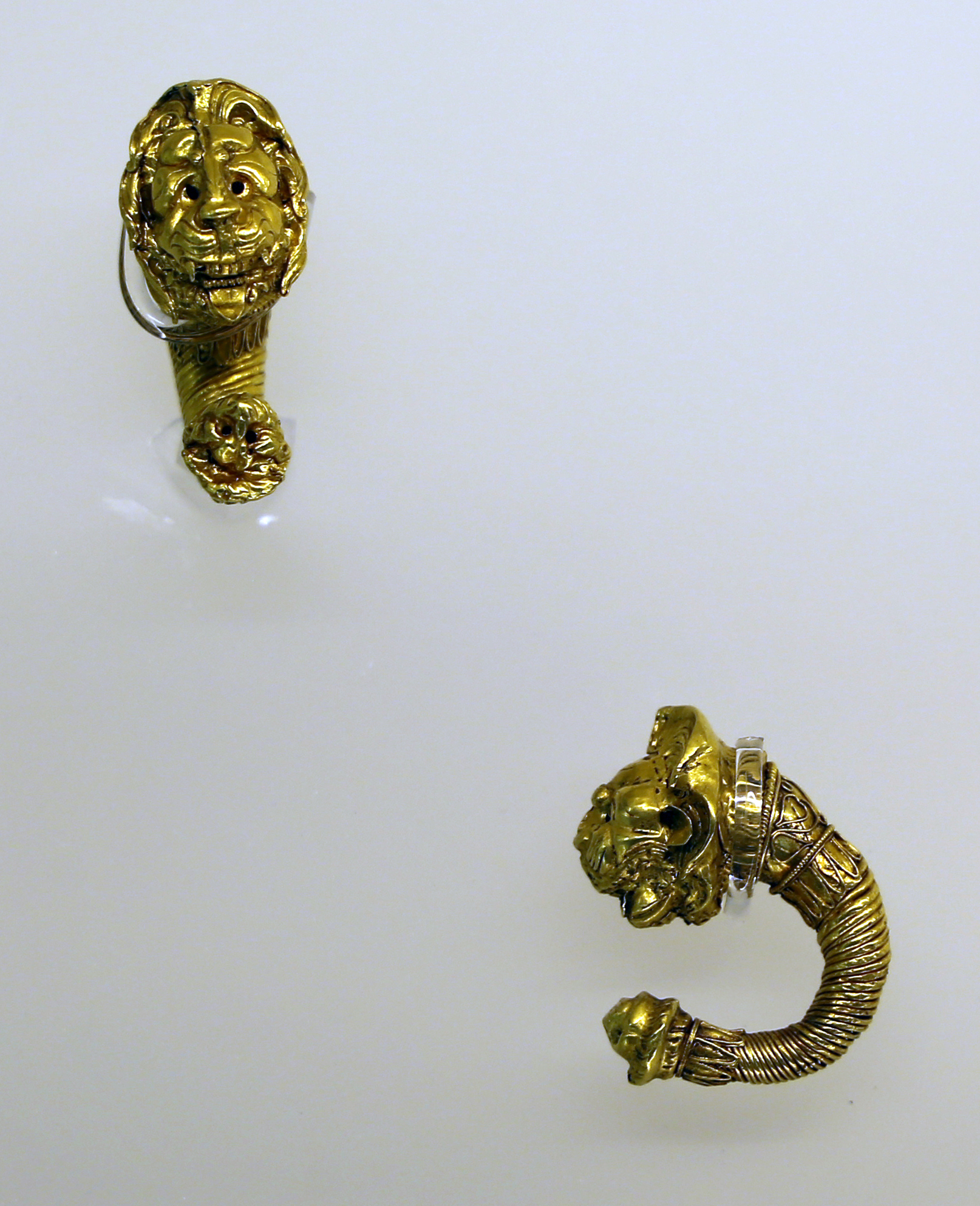
Etruria, goldsmiths of the classical and late classical period, 4th-2nd century BC, earrings with leonin protomes from cerveteri

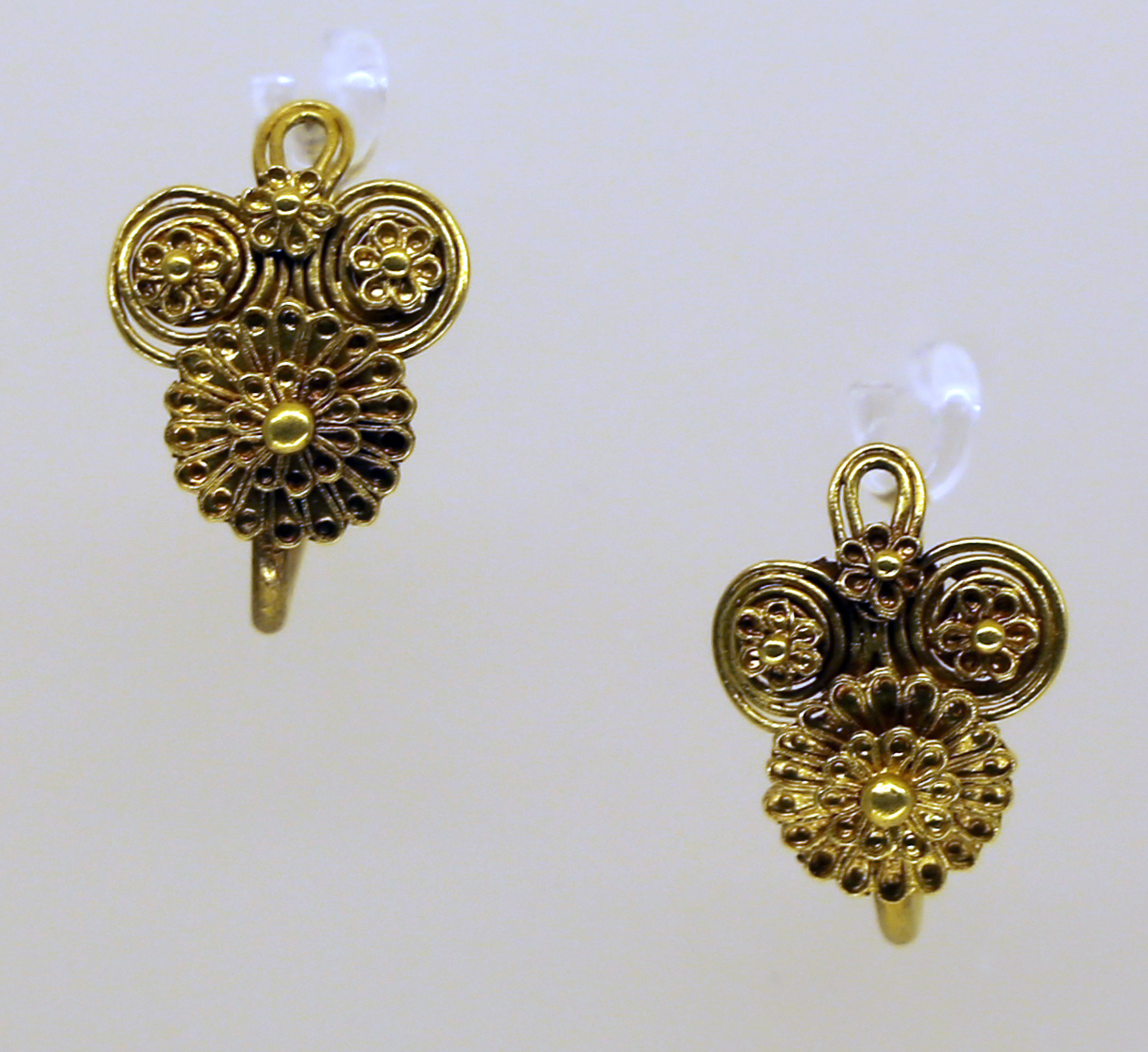
Etruria, goldsmiths of the classical and late classical period, 4th-2nd century BC, pendants

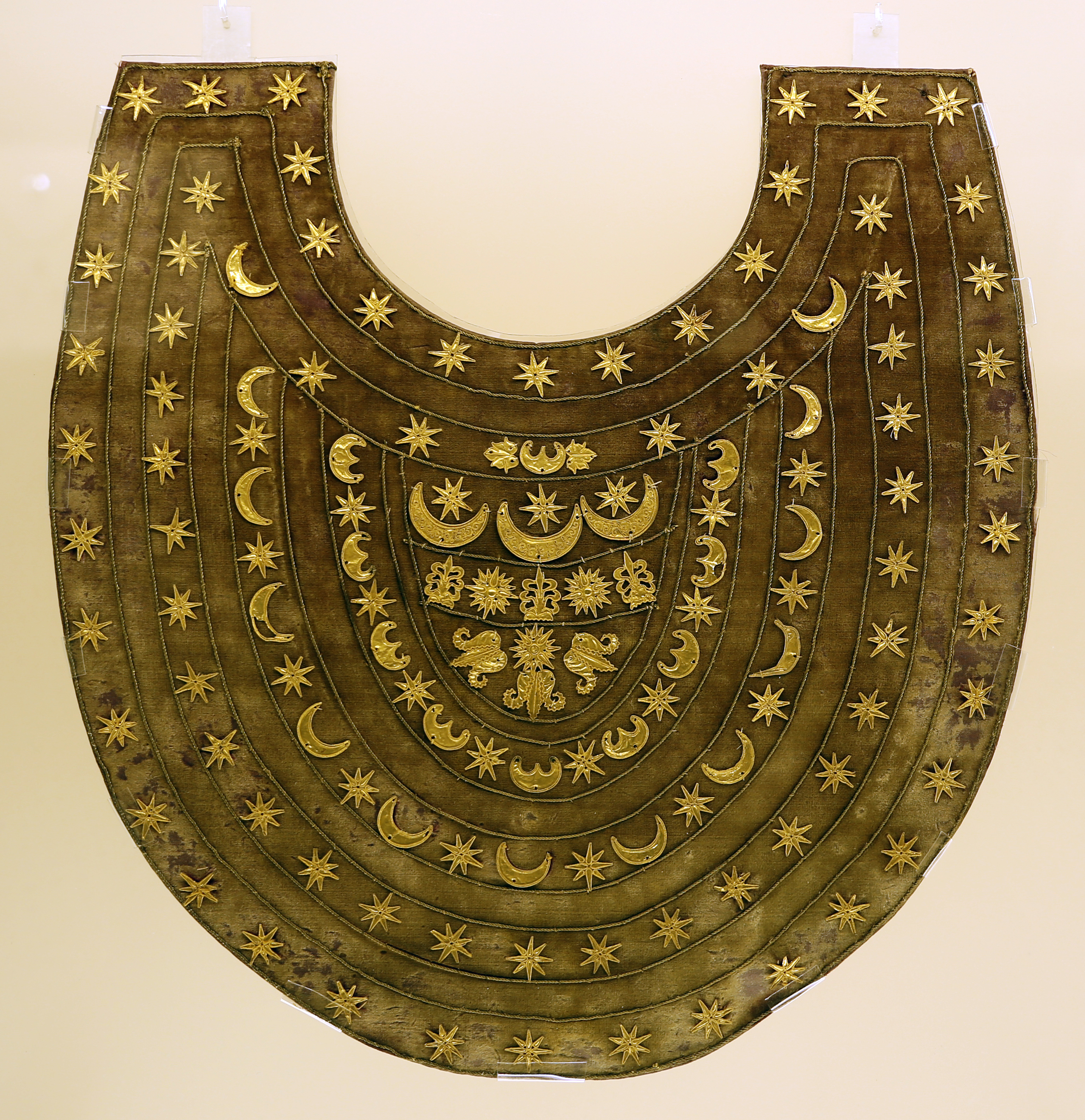
Etruria, goldsmiths of the classical and late classical period, 4th-2nd century BC, breastplate with star and crescent-shaped bracts rebuilt by the castellans (surroundings of Bolsena)

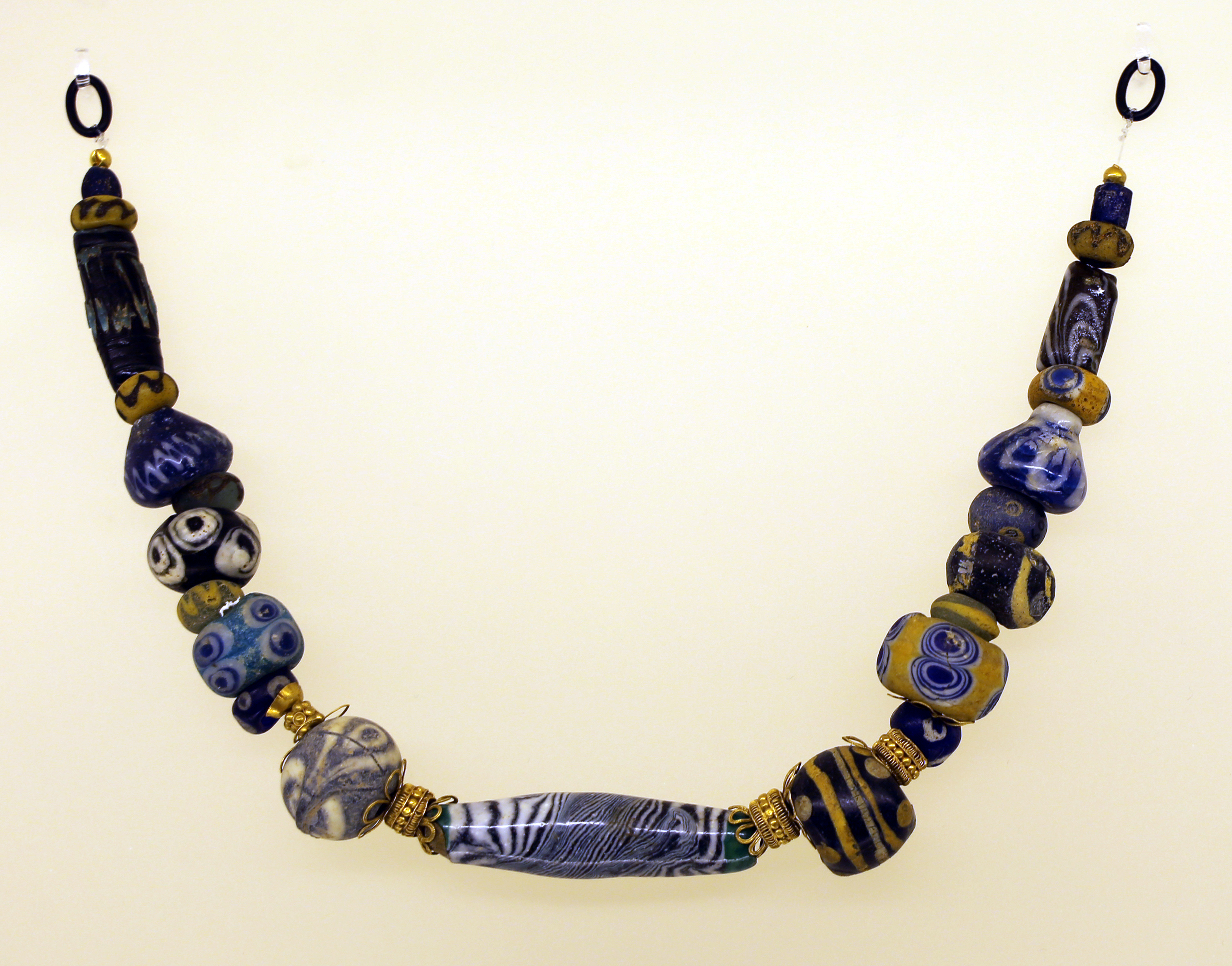
Etruria, goldsmiths from the Hellenistic period, c. 310-100 BC, necklace with vague glass pastes millefiori 01

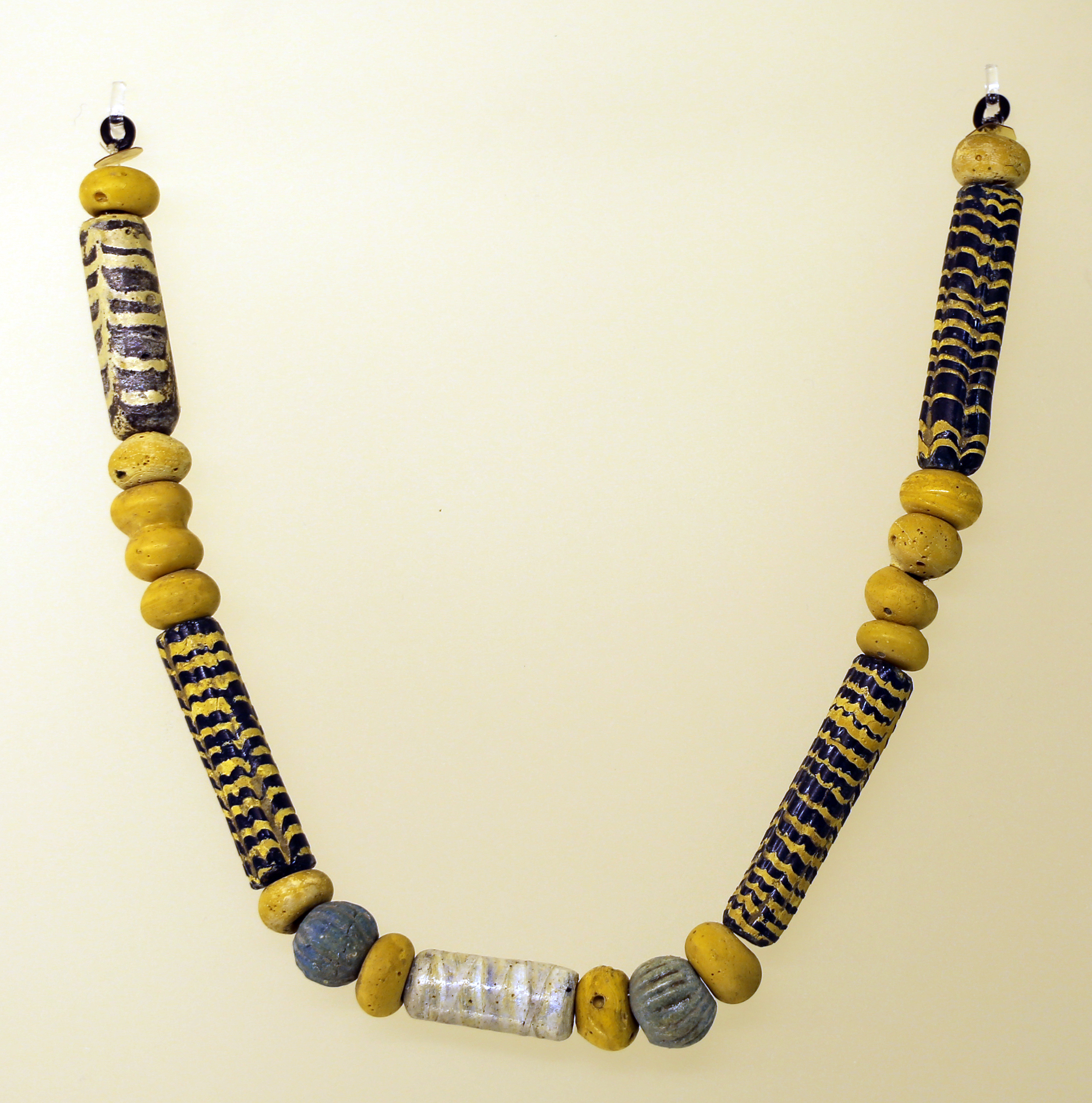
Etruria, goldsmiths from the Hellenistic period, c. 310-100 BC, necklace with vague glass pastes millefiori 03

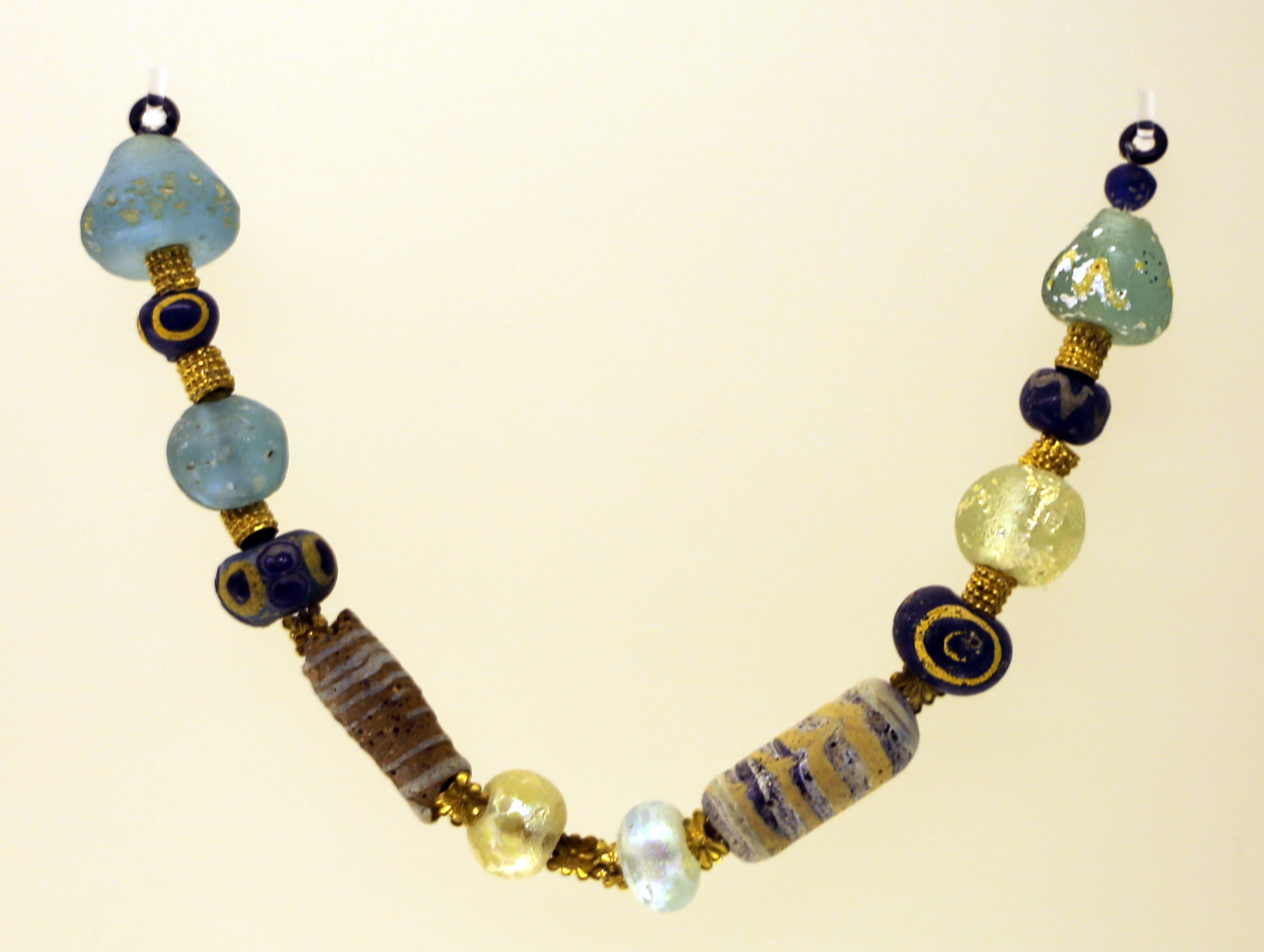
Etruria, goldsmiths from the Hellenistic period, c. 310-100 BC, necklace with vague glass pastes millefiori 04

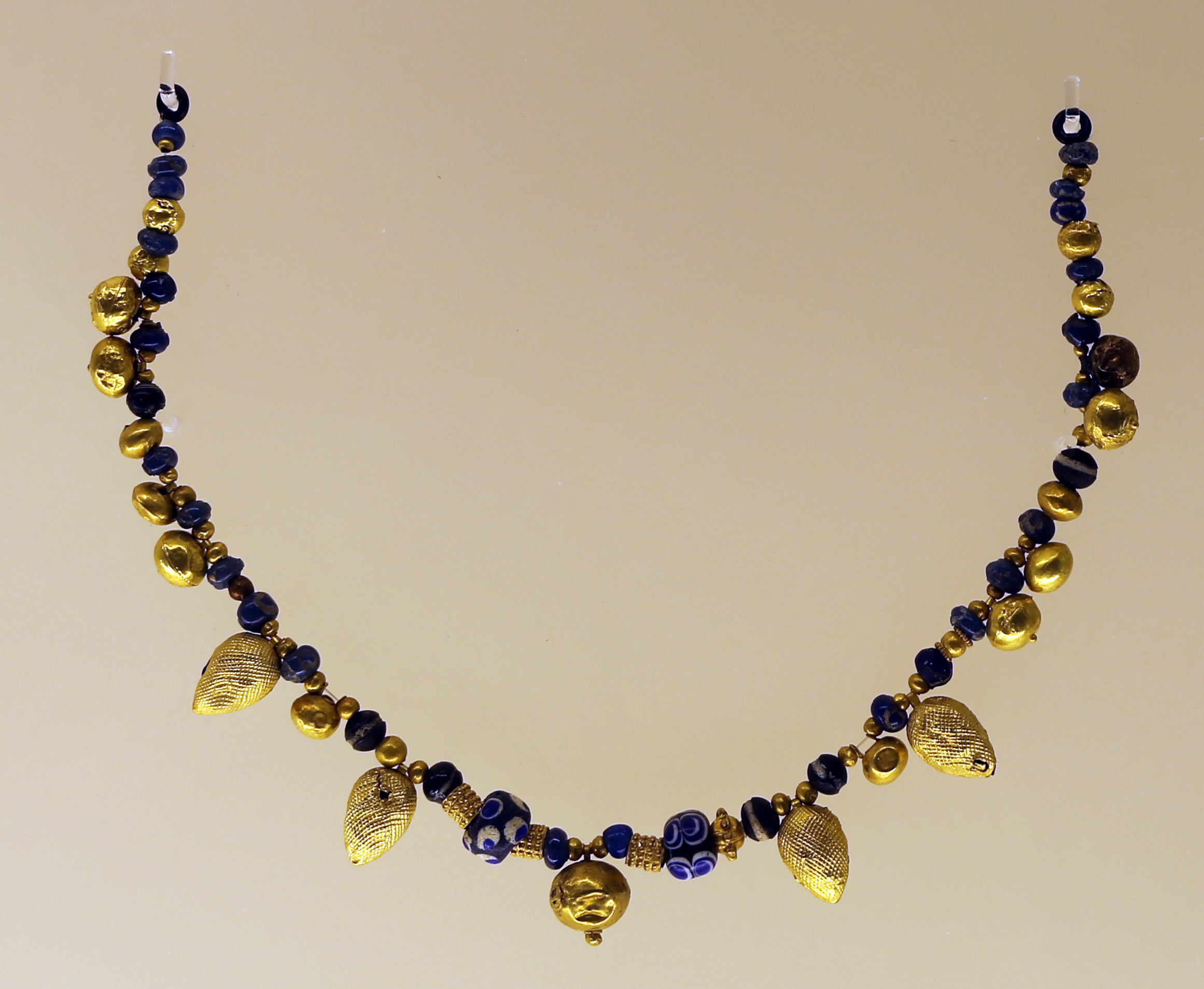
Etruria, goldsmiths from the Hellenistic period, c. 310-100 BC, necklace with vague glass pastes millefiori 05

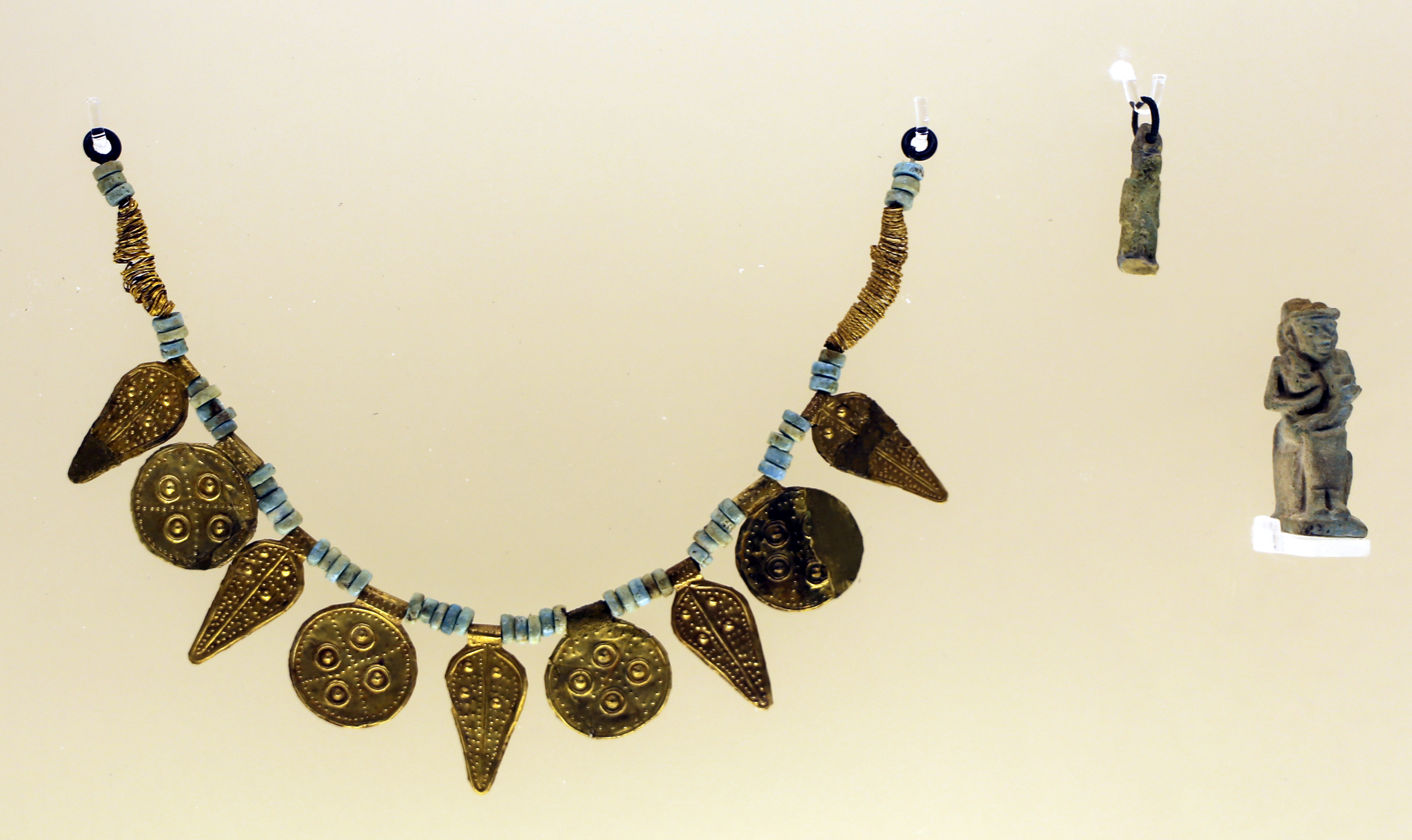
Etruria, goldsmiths from the orientalizing period, 7th century BC, necklace with faience rings and gold pendants

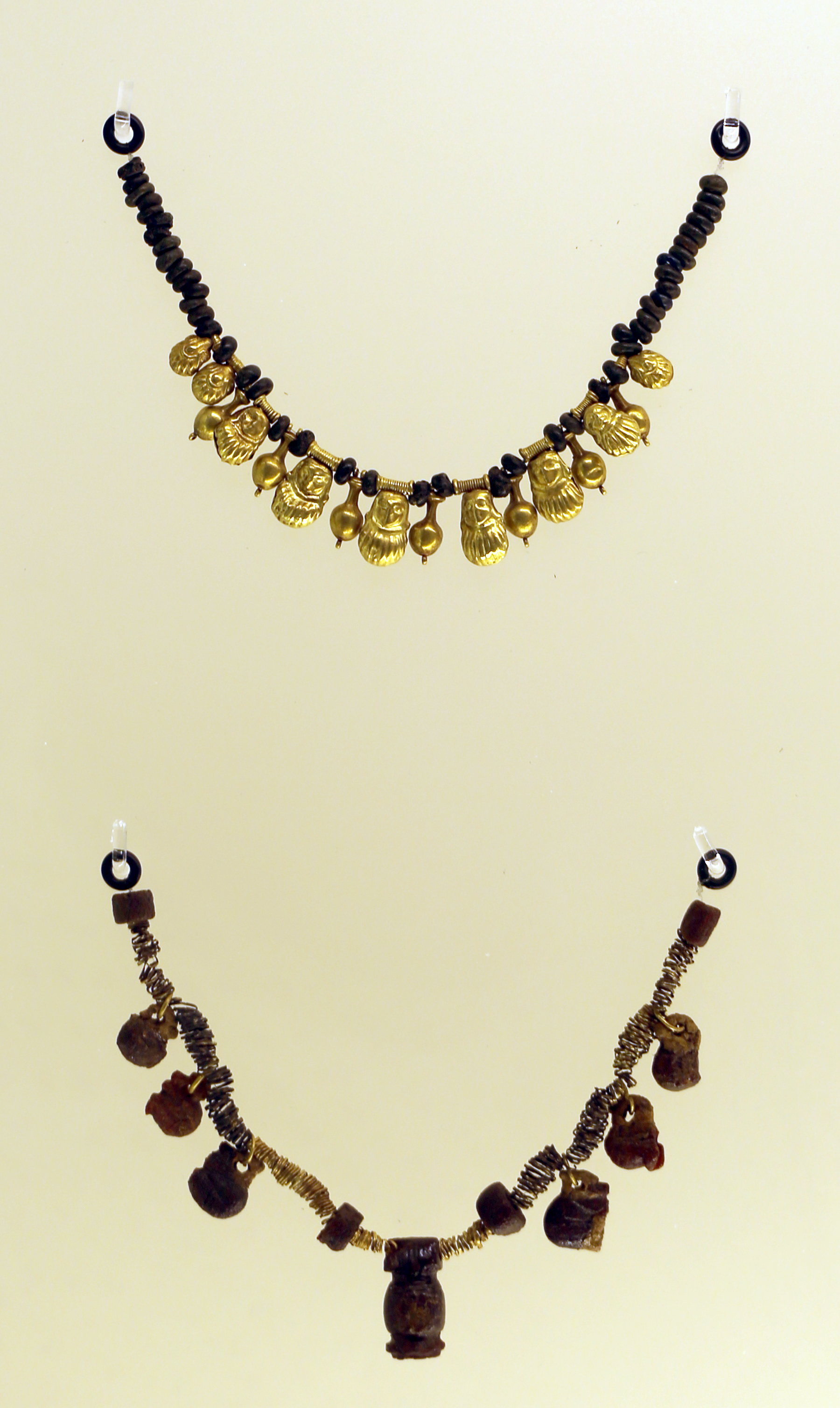
Etruria, goldsmiths from the orientalizing period, 7th century BC, necklaces with pendants

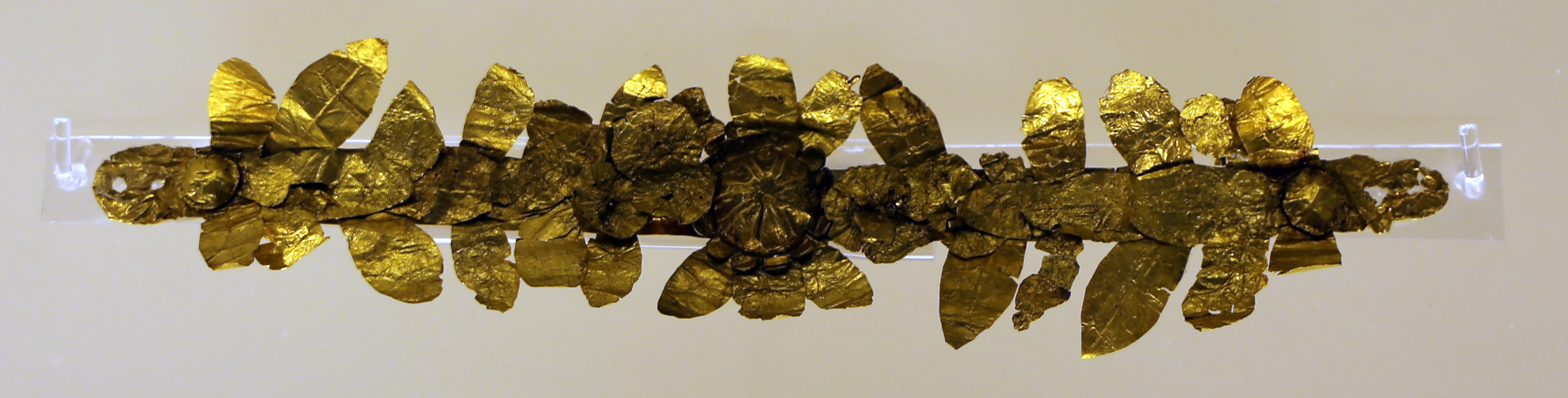
Etruria, goldsmiths from the Hellenistic period, c. 310-100 BC, funeral wreath

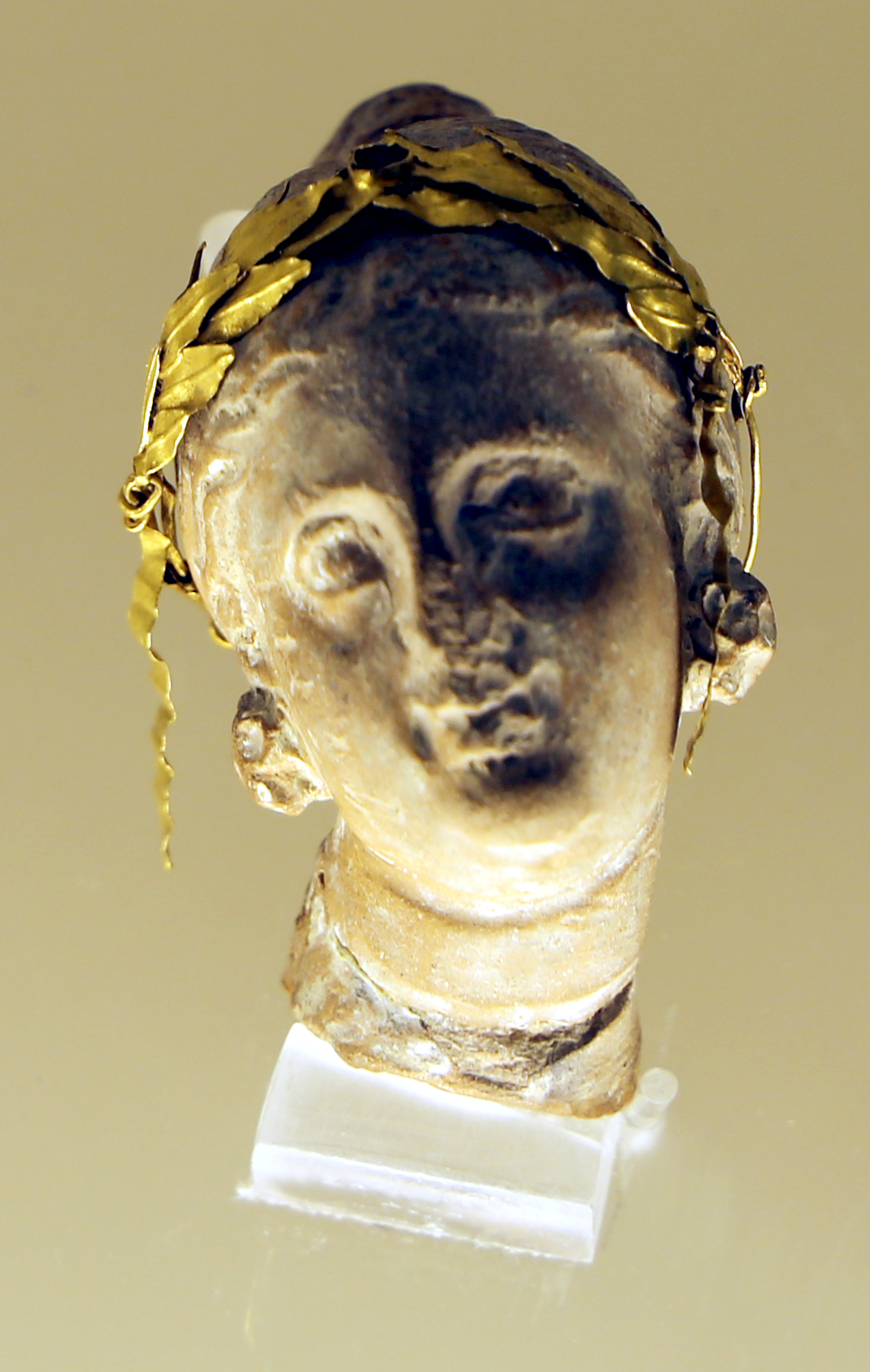
Etruria, Hellenistic period goldsmiths, c. 310-100 BC, head with laurel wreath diadem

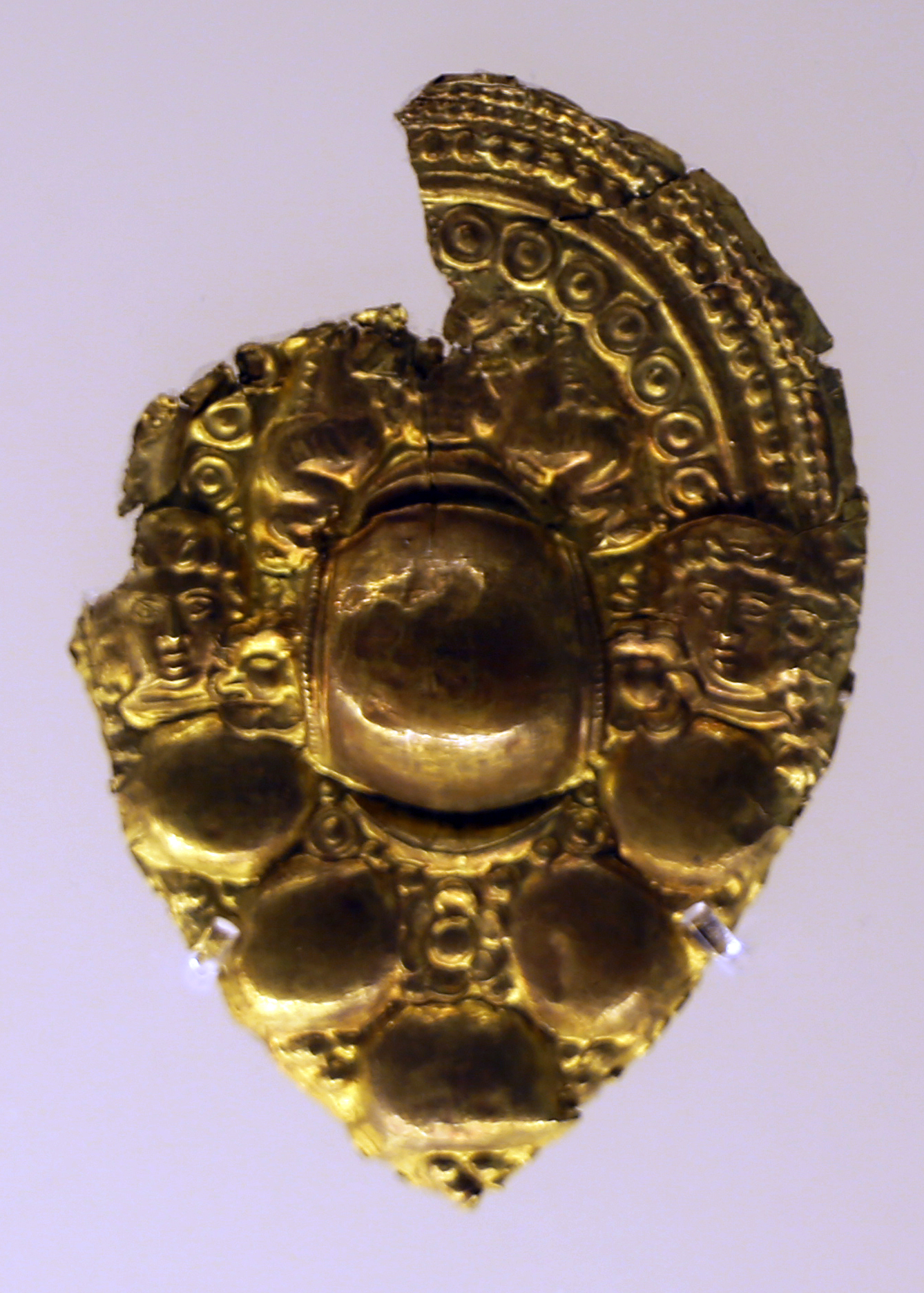
Etruria, goldsmiths from the Hellenistic period, c. 310-100 BC, oval shield earrings with a cluster hanging in rows of globes 01

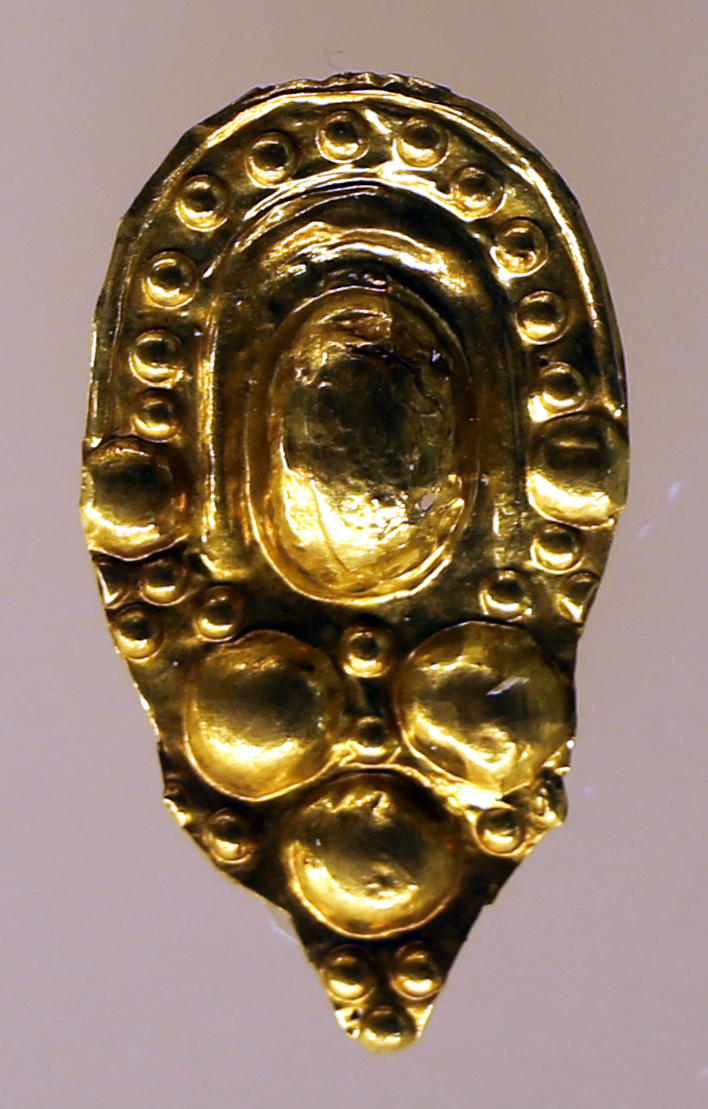
Etruria, goldsmiths from the Hellenistic period, c. 310-100 BC, oval shield earrings with a cluster hanging in rows of globes 02

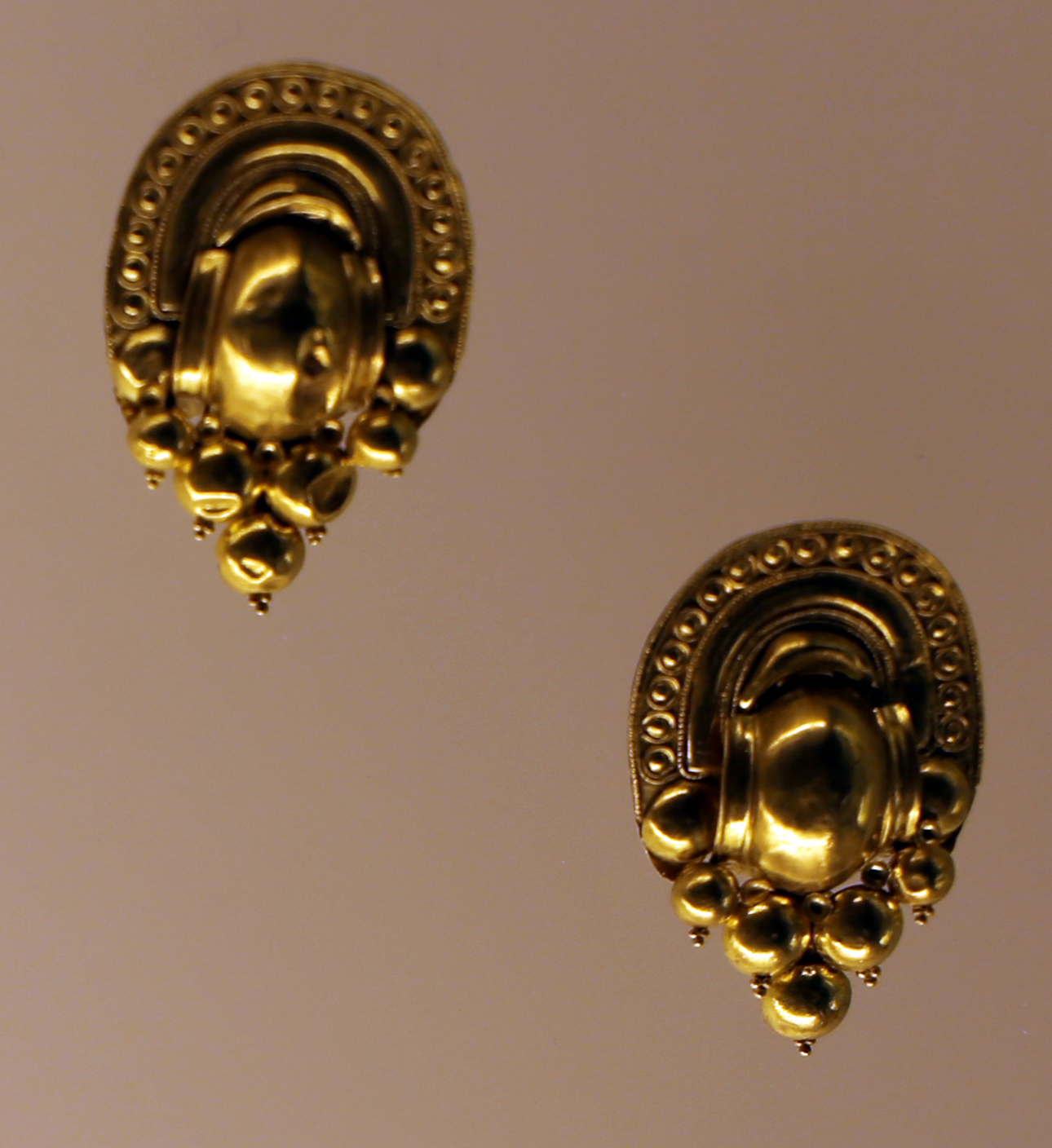
Etruria, goldsmiths from the Hellenistic period, c. 310-100 BC, oval shield earrings with a cluster hanging in rows of globes 03

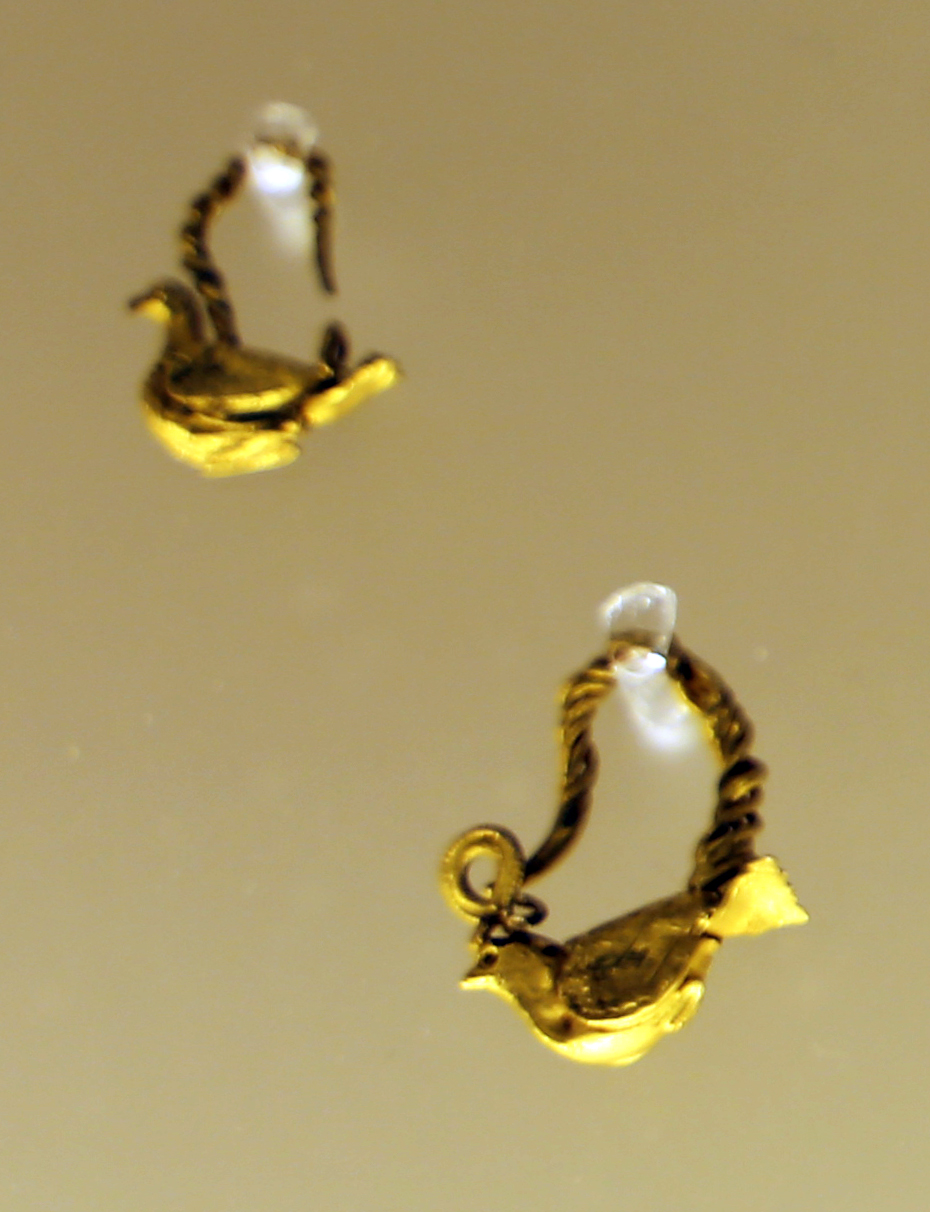
Etruria, goldsmiths from the Hellenistic period, c. 310-100 BC, earrings with doves

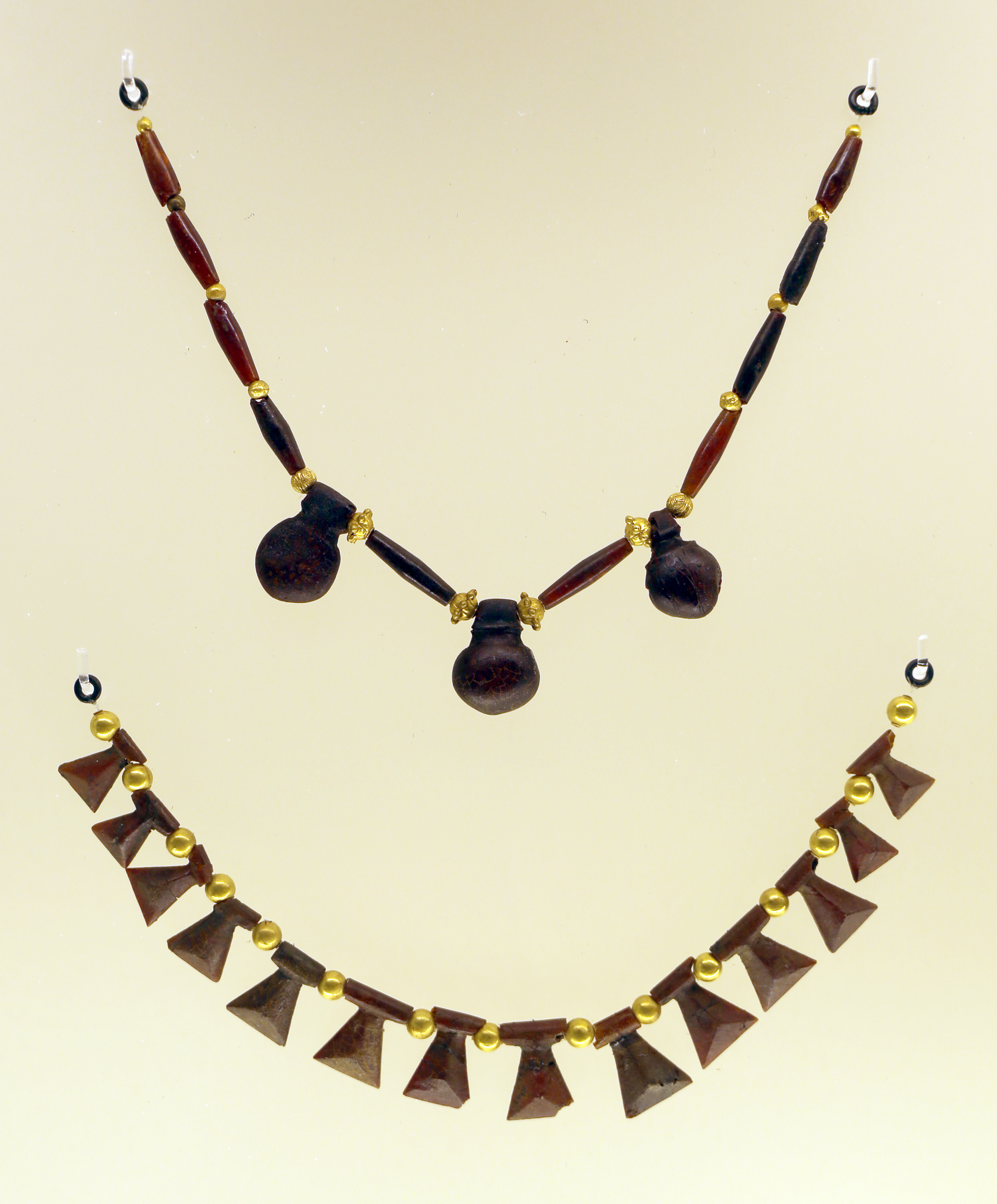
Etruria, goldsmiths from the orientalizing period, 7th century BC, gold and amber necklaces, from cerveteri

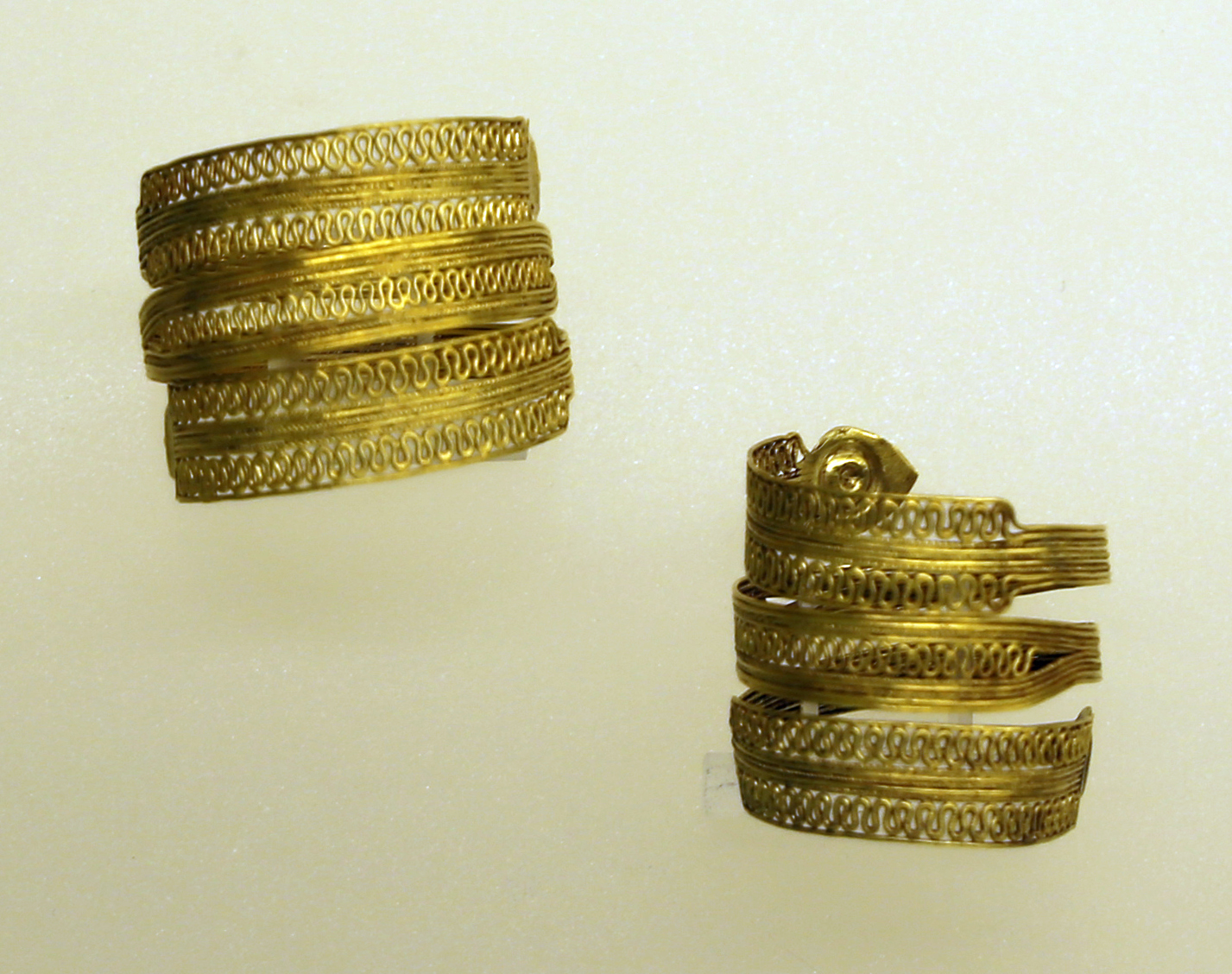
Etruria, goldsmiths of the orientalizing period, 7th century BC, spiral braid holder 01

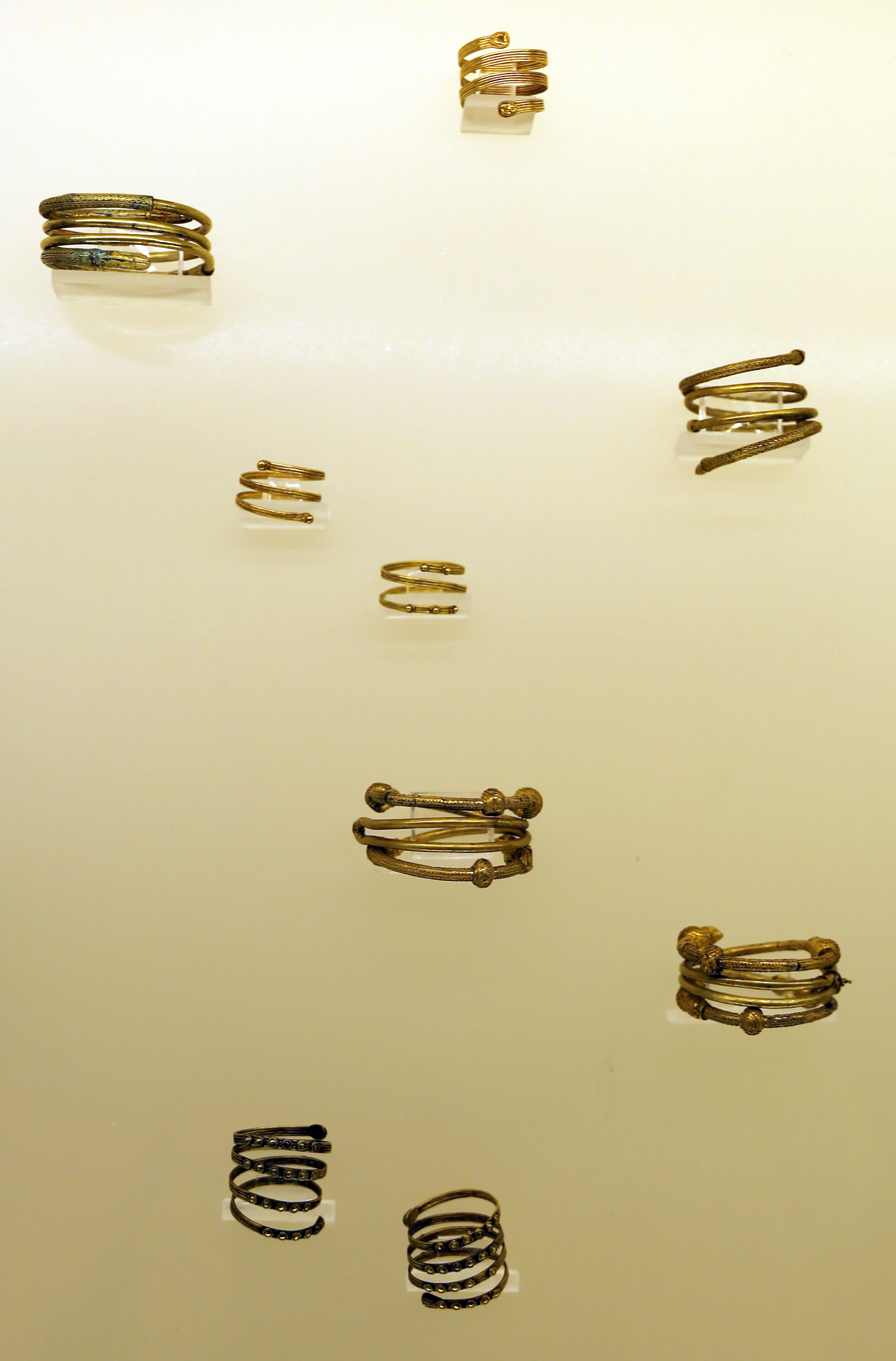
Etruria, goldsmiths of the orientalizing period, 7th century BC, spiral braid holder 02

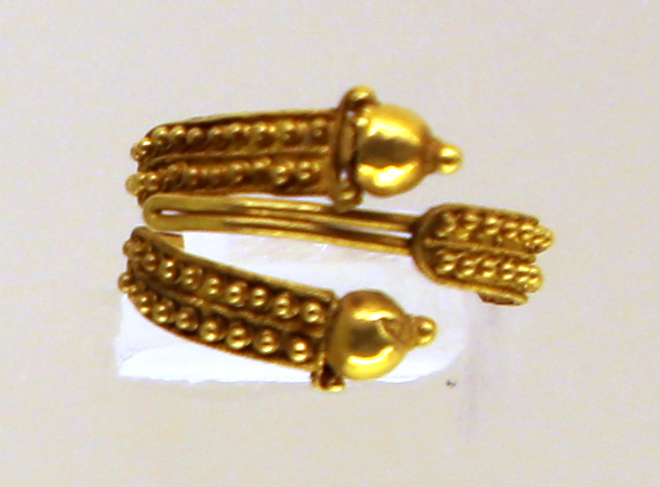
Etruria, goldsmiths from the orientalizing period, 7th century BC, braid holder with granulation decoration

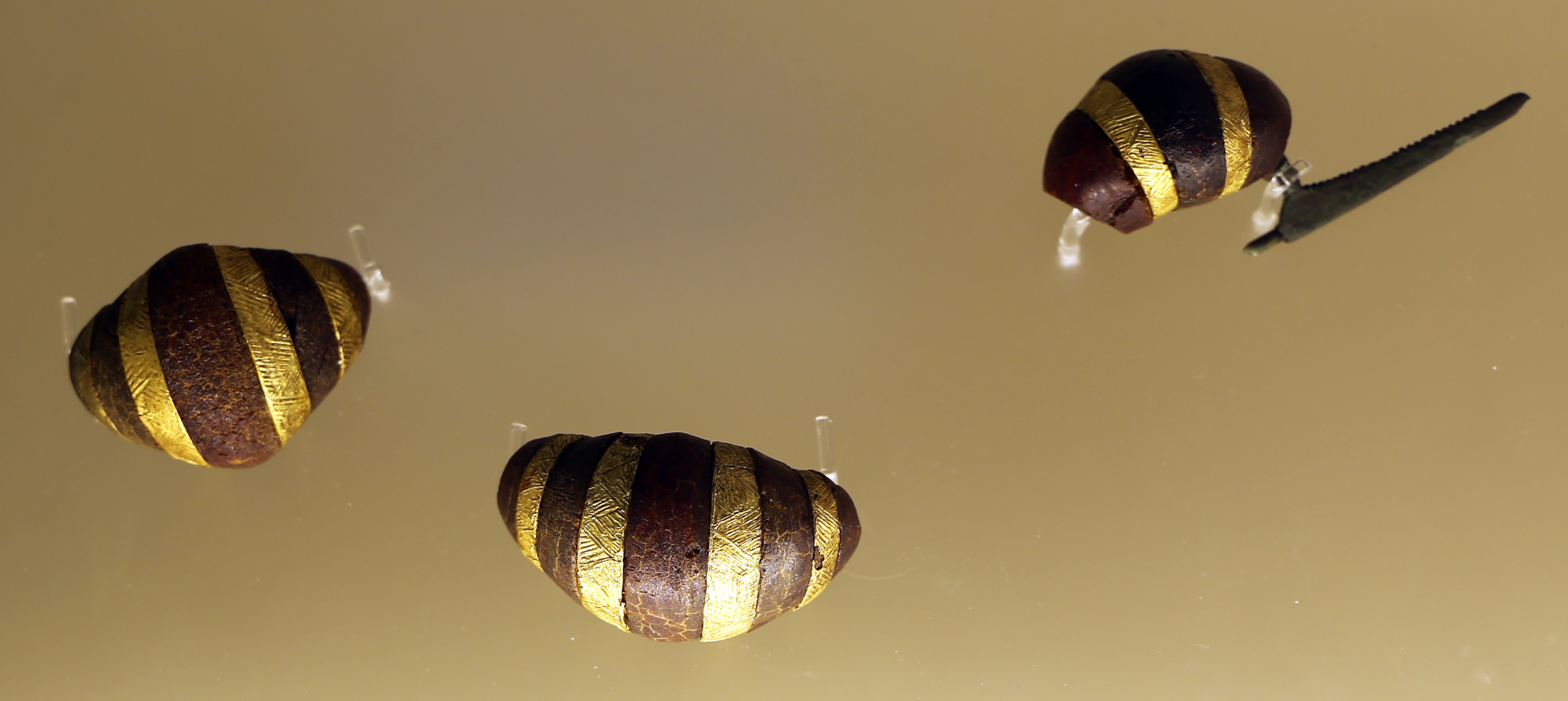
Etruria, goldsmiths from the orientalizing period, 7th century BC, amber fibulae with gold leaf 01

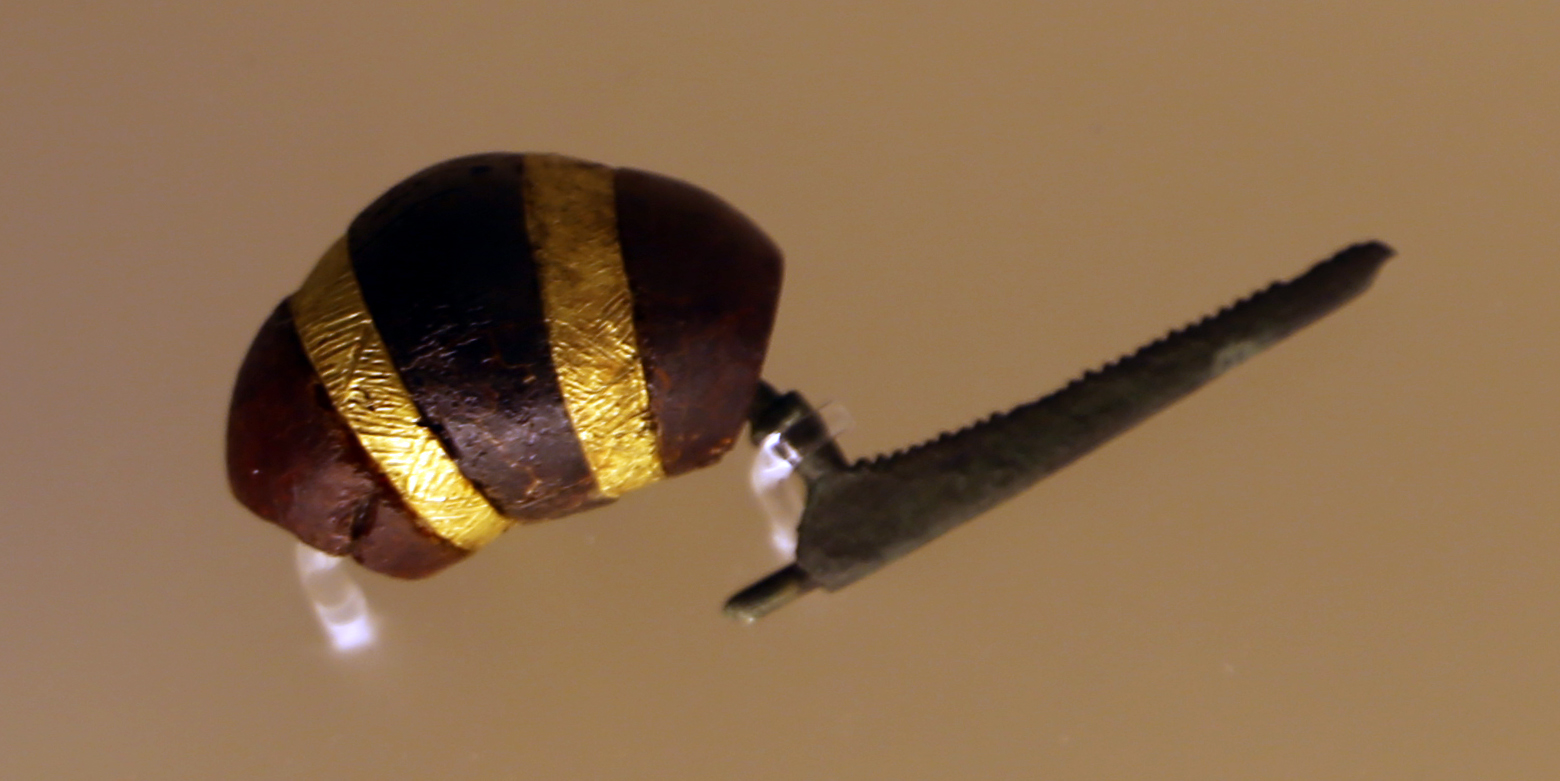
Etruria, goldsmiths from the orientalizing period, 7th century BC, amber fibulae with gold leaf 02

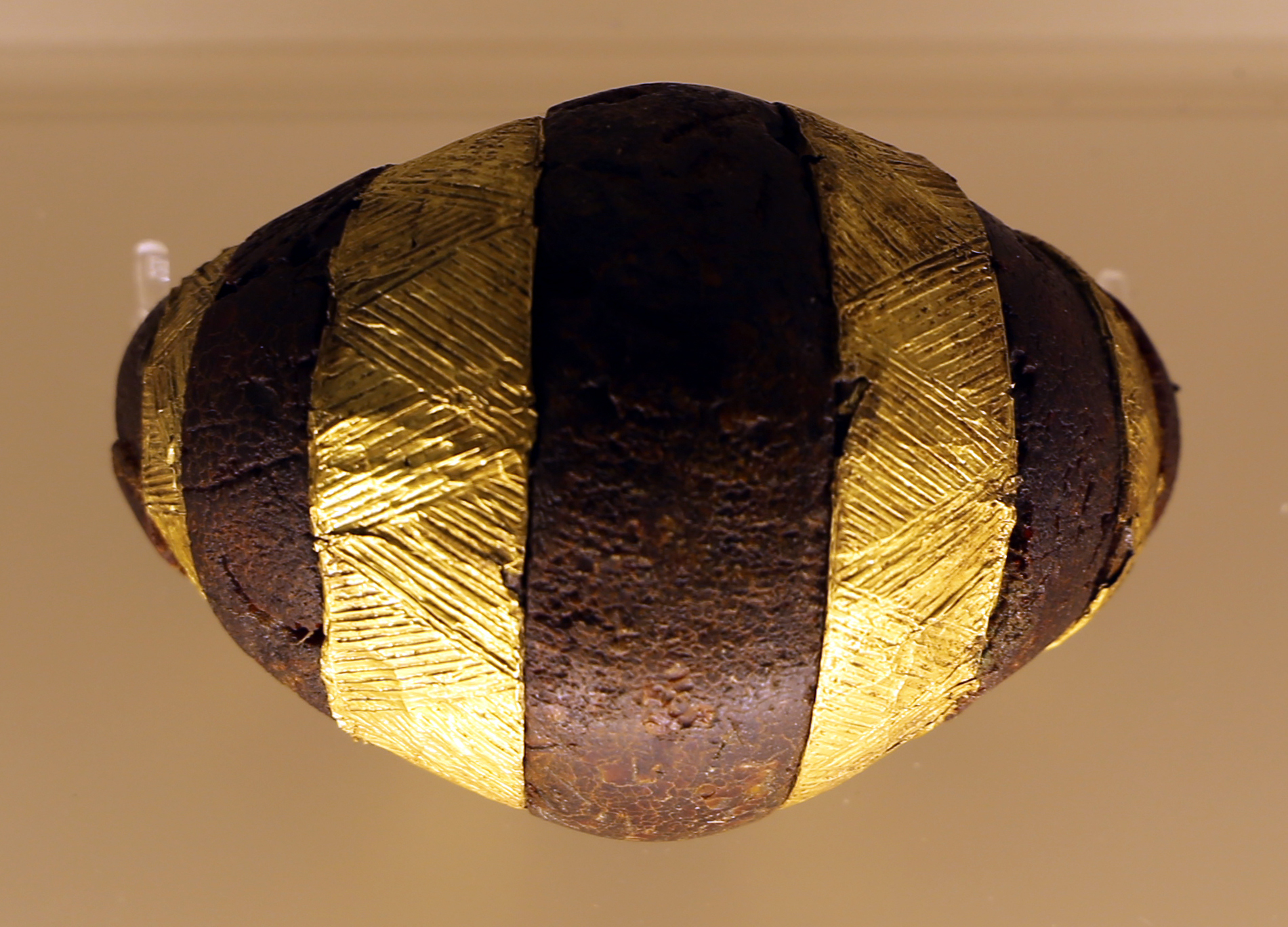
Etruria, goldsmiths from the orientalizing period, 7th century BC, amber fibulae with gold leaf 03

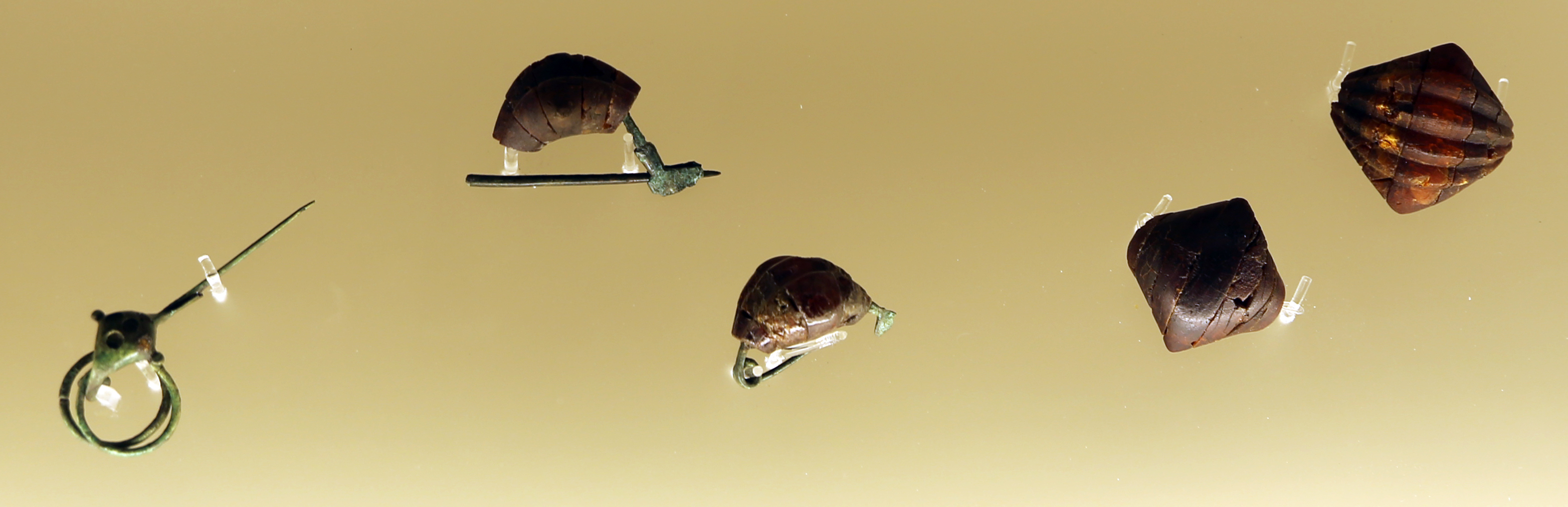
Etruria, goldsmiths from the orientalizing period, 7th century BC, amber and metal fibulae

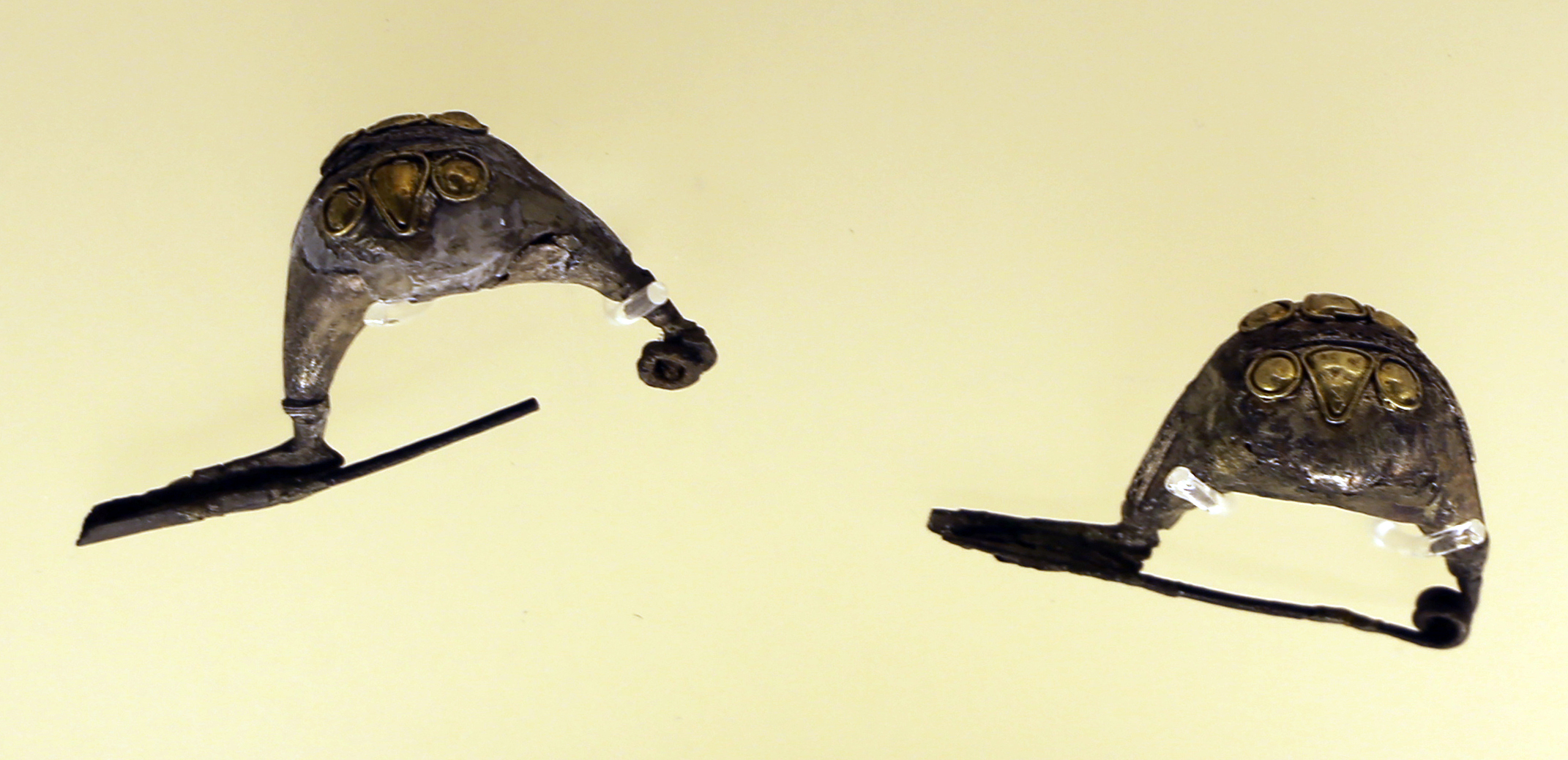
Etruria, goldsmiths from the orientalizing period, 7th century BC, silver and gold fibulae

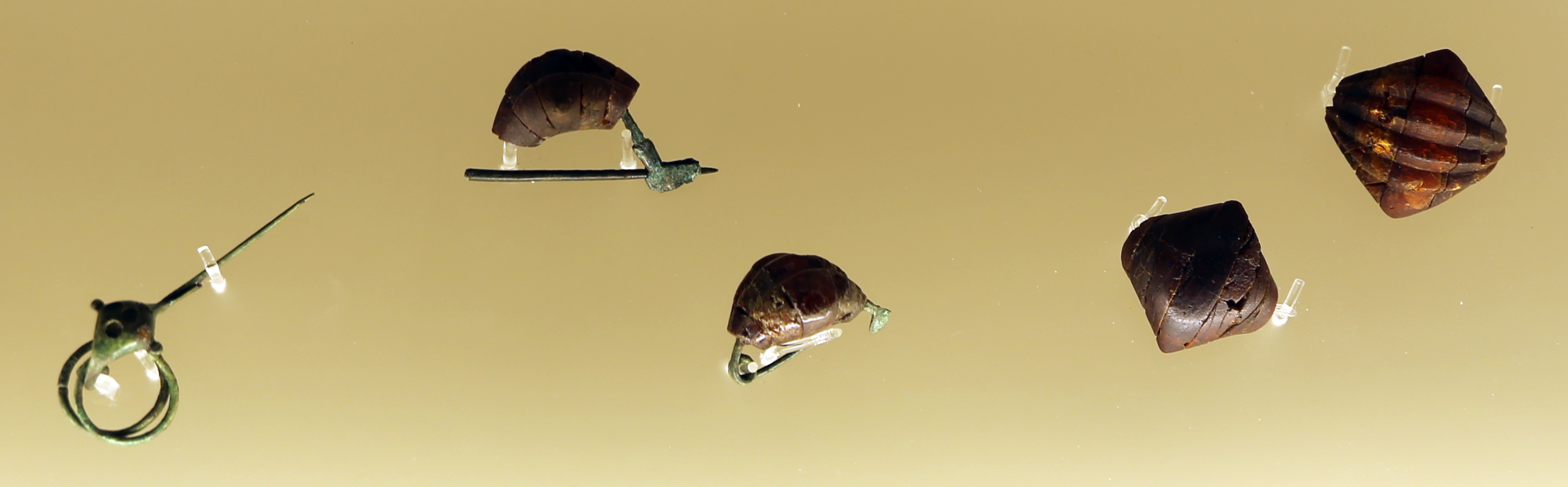
Etruria, goldsmiths from the orientalizing period, 7th century BC, gold and amber fibulae

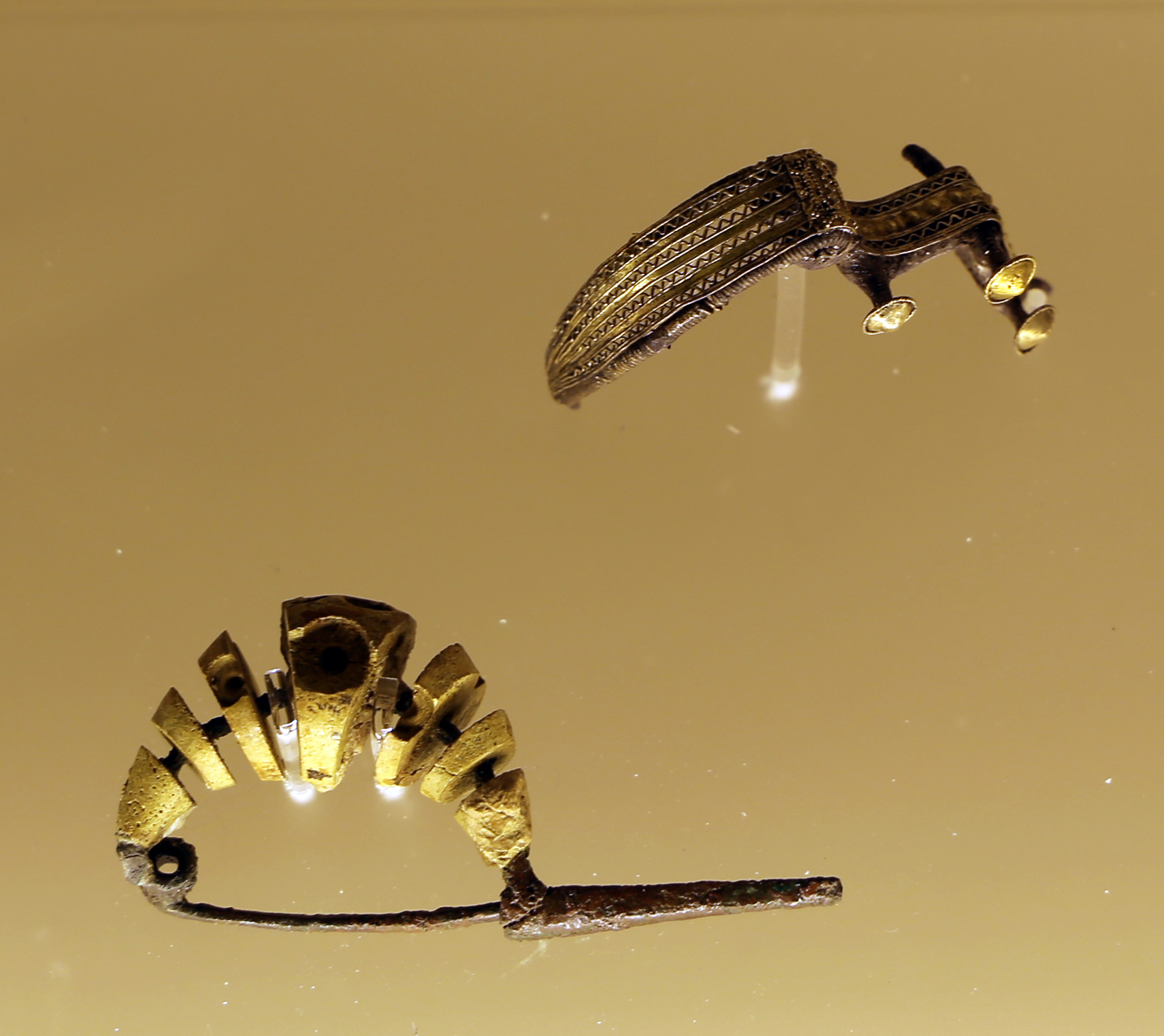
Etruria, goldsmiths from the orientalizing period, 7th century BC, gold fibulae

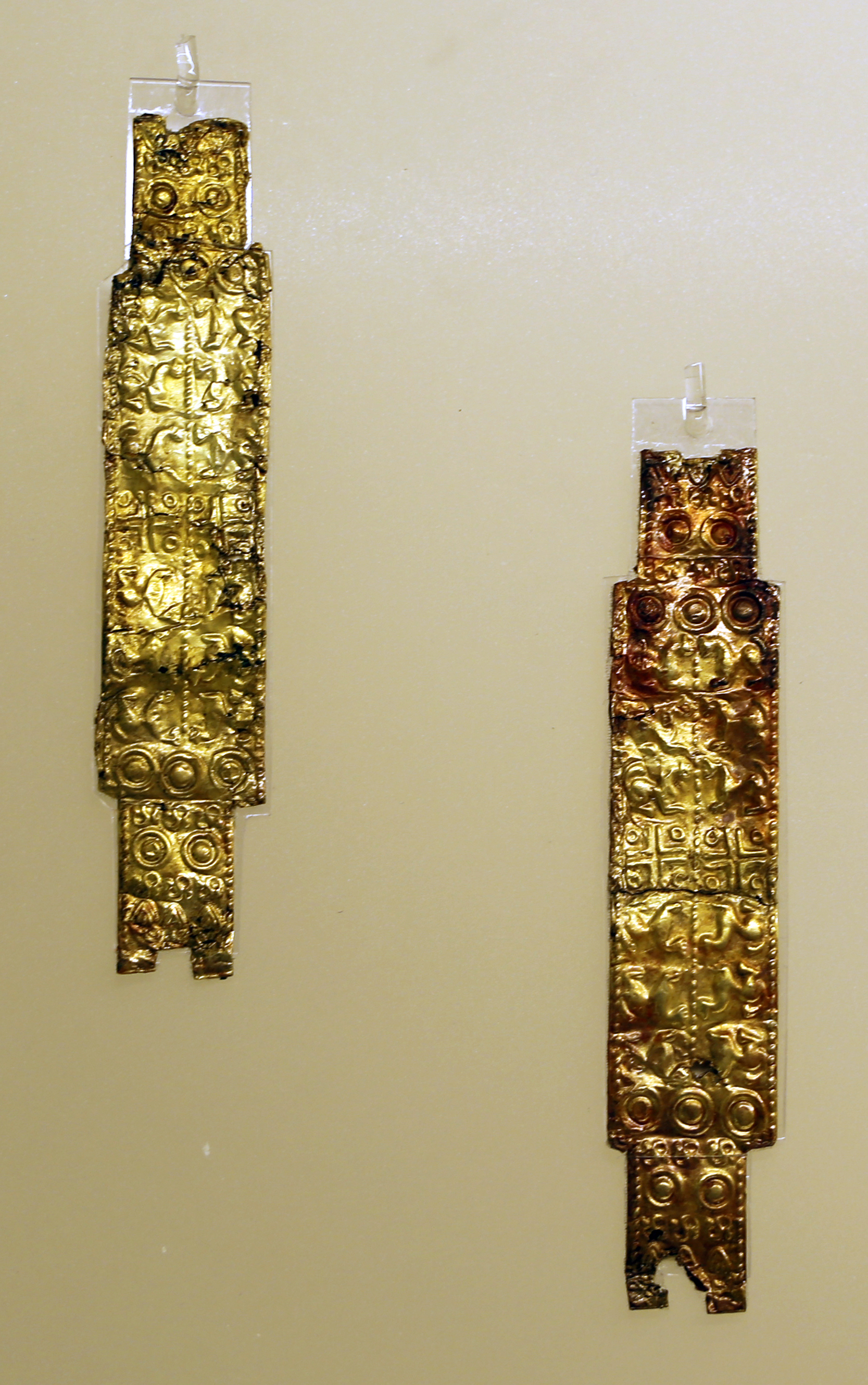
Etruria, goldsmiths from the orientalizing period, 7th century BC, lamellae

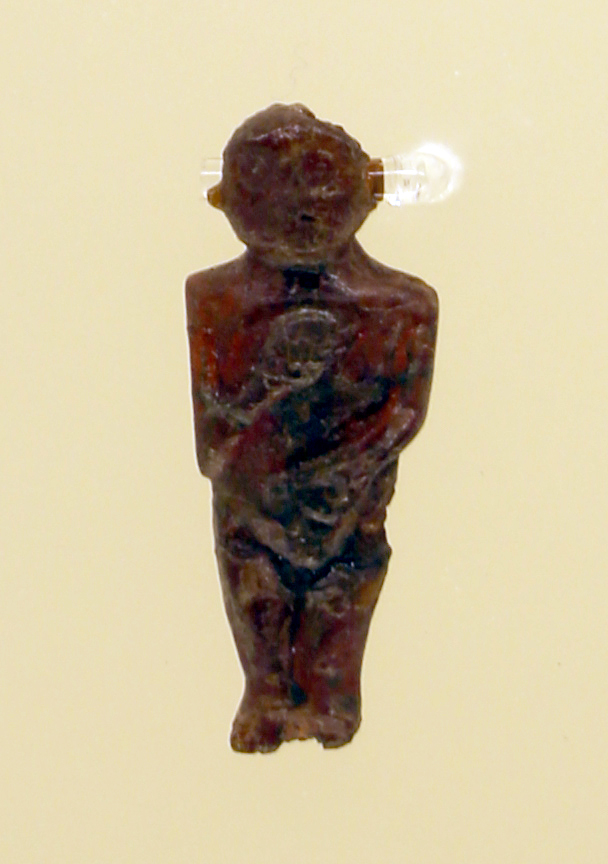
Etruria, goldsmiths from the orientalizing period, 7th century BC, amber pendants with a female figure, from the galeassi tomb in palestrina

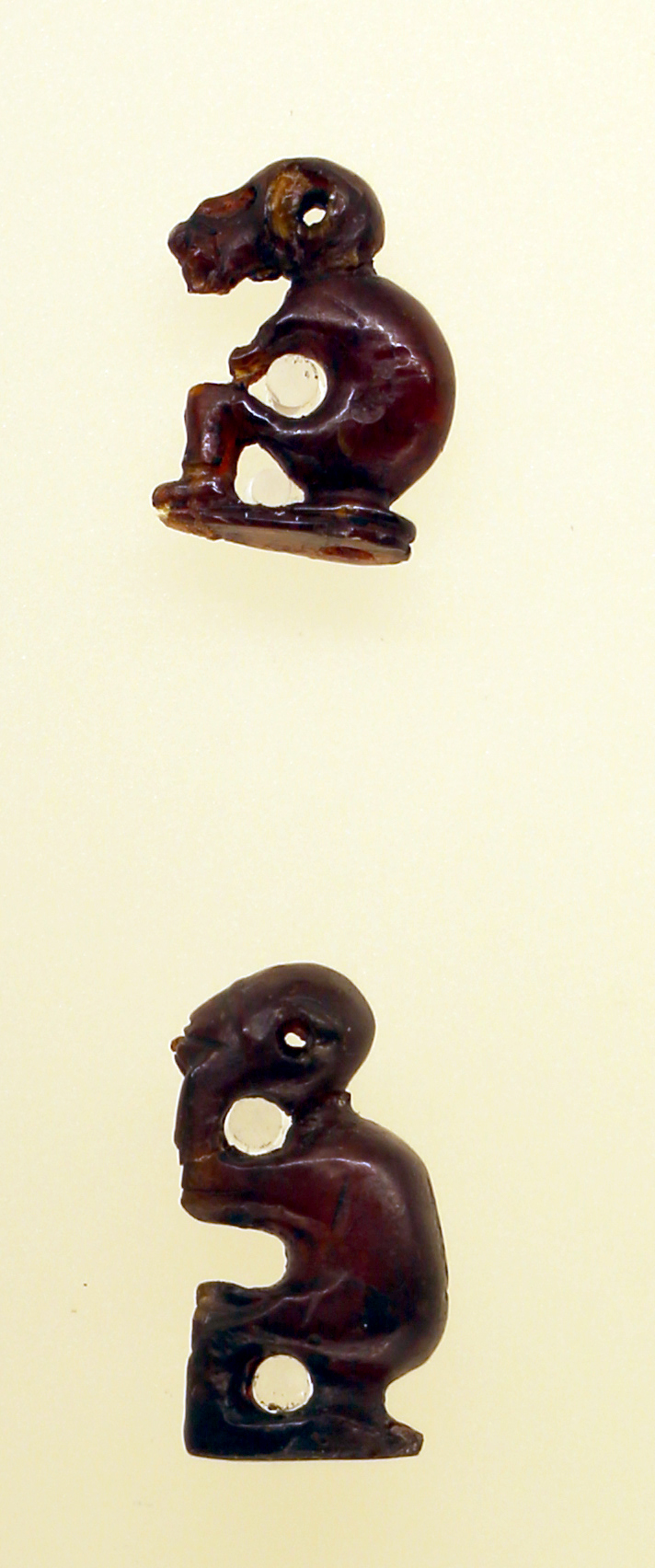
Etruria, goldsmiths from the orientalizing period, 7th century BC, amber pendants with crouching monkeys, from the galeassi tomb in palestrina

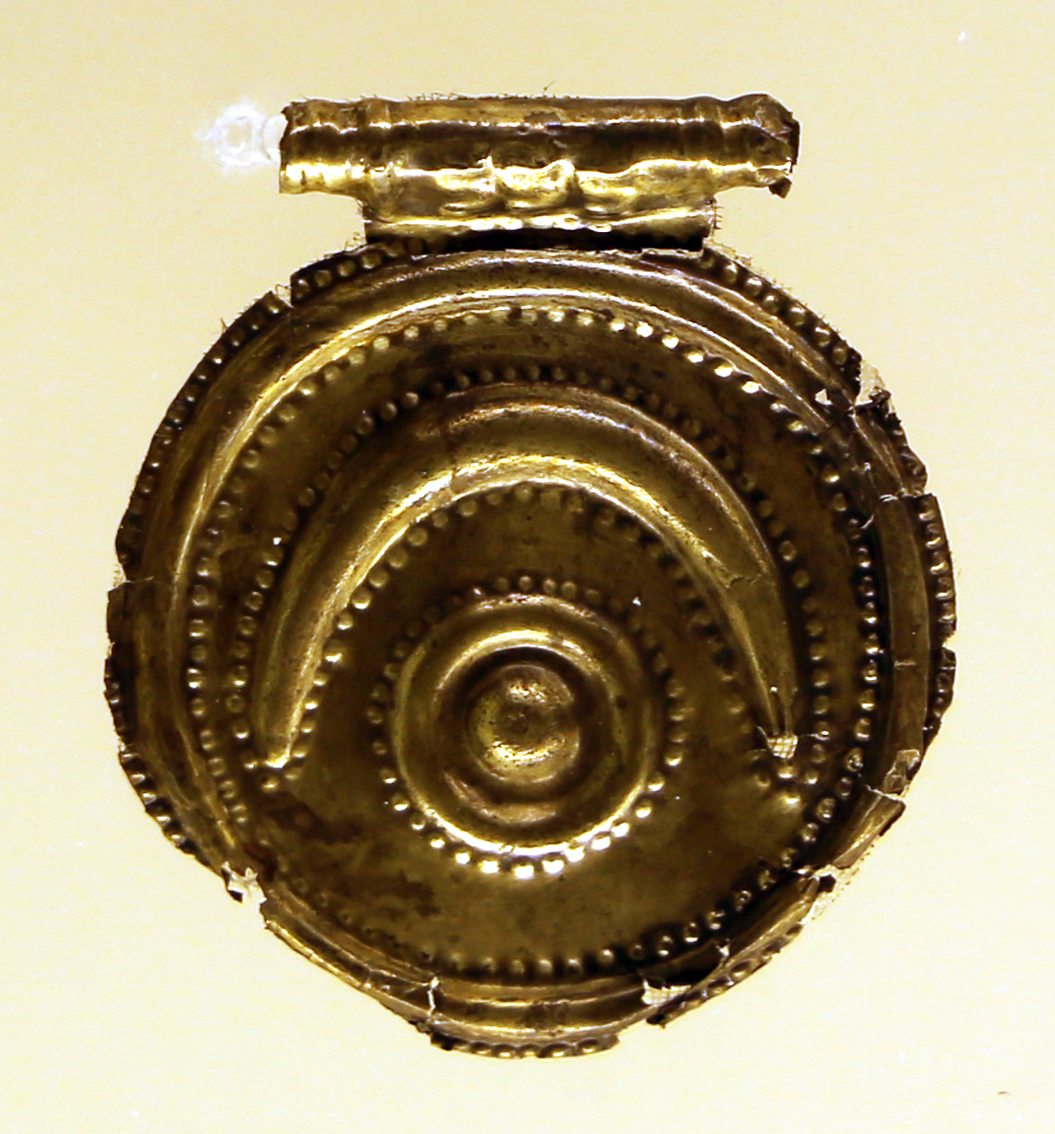
Etruria, goldsmiths from the orientalizing period, 7th century BC, bulla pendant

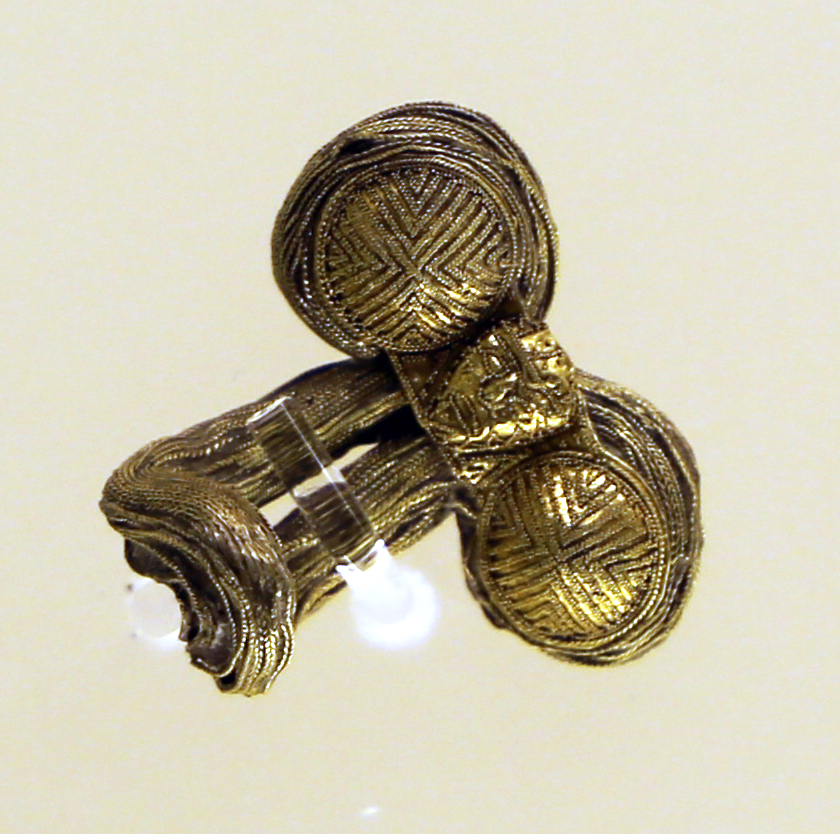
Etruria, goldsmiths from the orientalizing period, 7th century BC, pendant

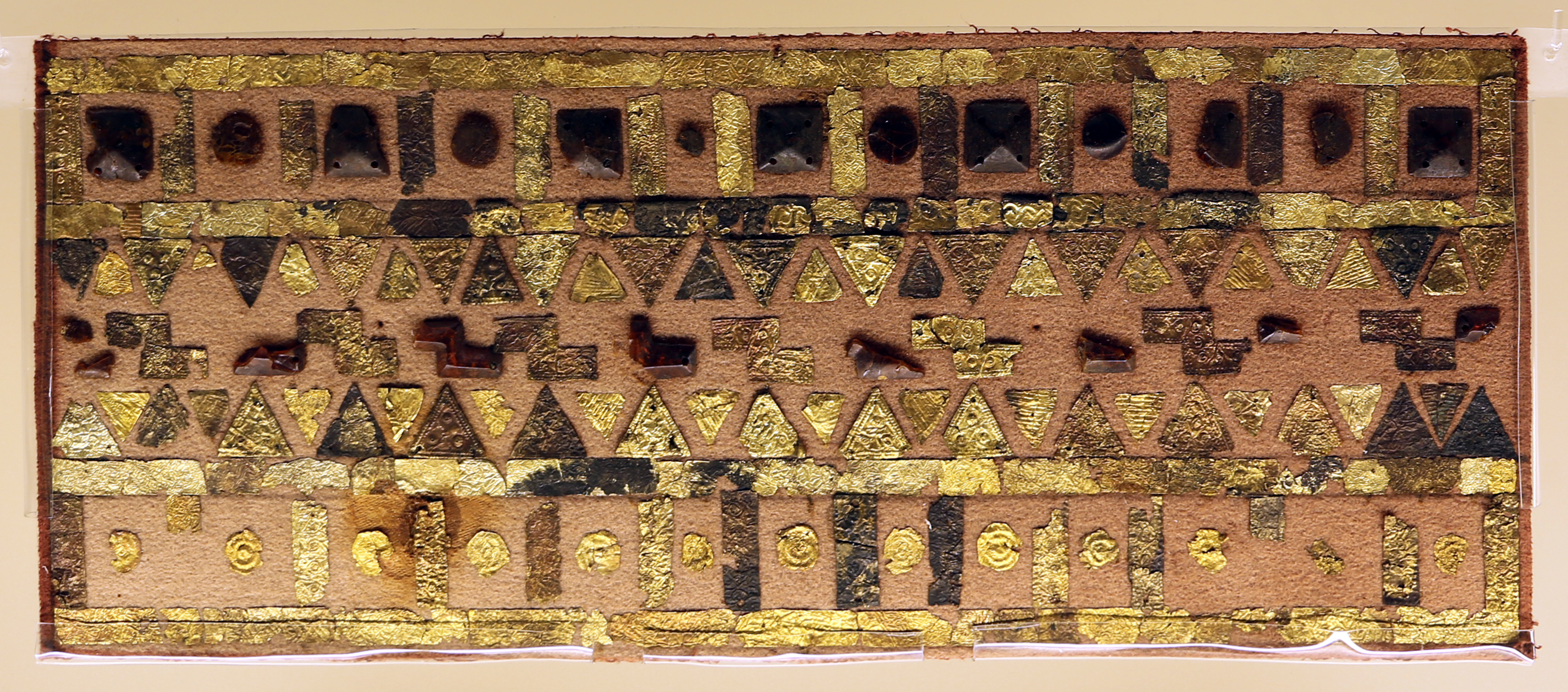
Etruria, goldsmiths from the orientalizing period, 7th century BC, breastplate from the Galeassi tomb in Palestrina, re-worked by the Castellani 02

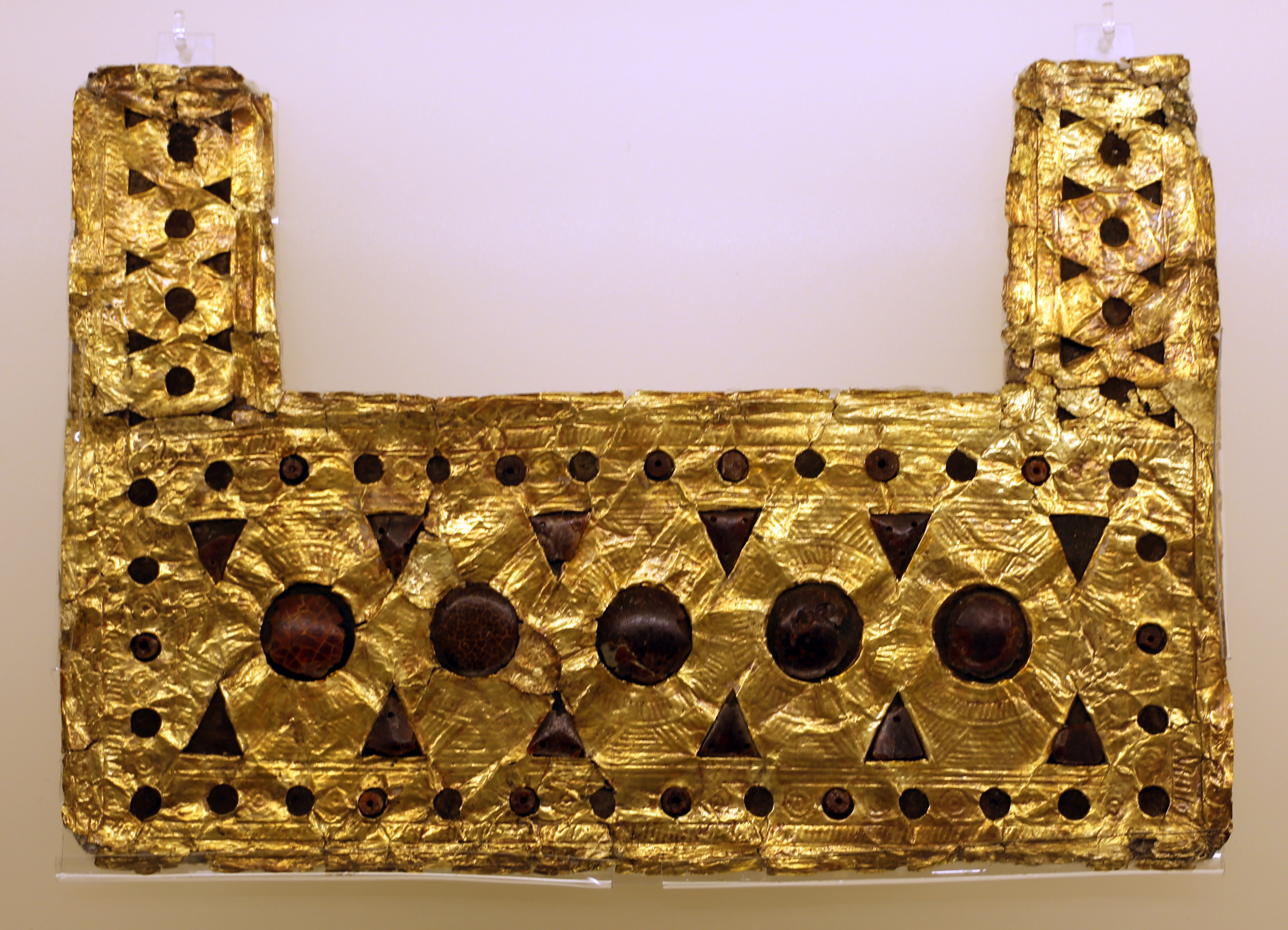
Etruria, goldsmiths from the orientalizing period, 7th century BC, breastplate from the Galeassi tomb in Palestrina, re-worked by the Castellani 022

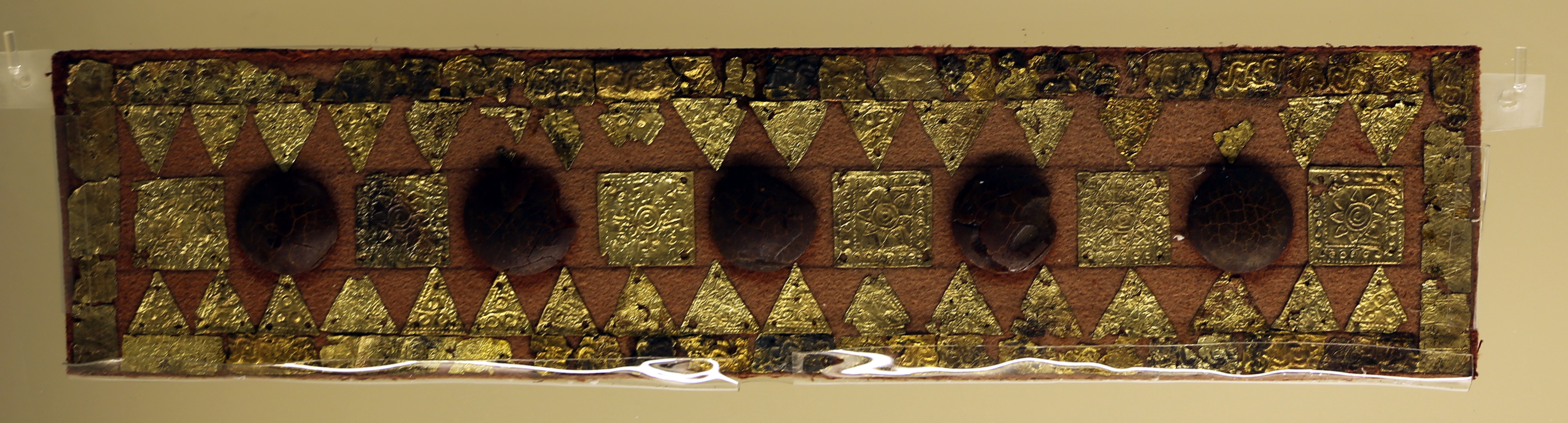
Etruria, goldsmiths from the orientalizing period, 7th century BC, breastplate from the Galeassi tomb in Palestrina, re-worked by the Castellani 023

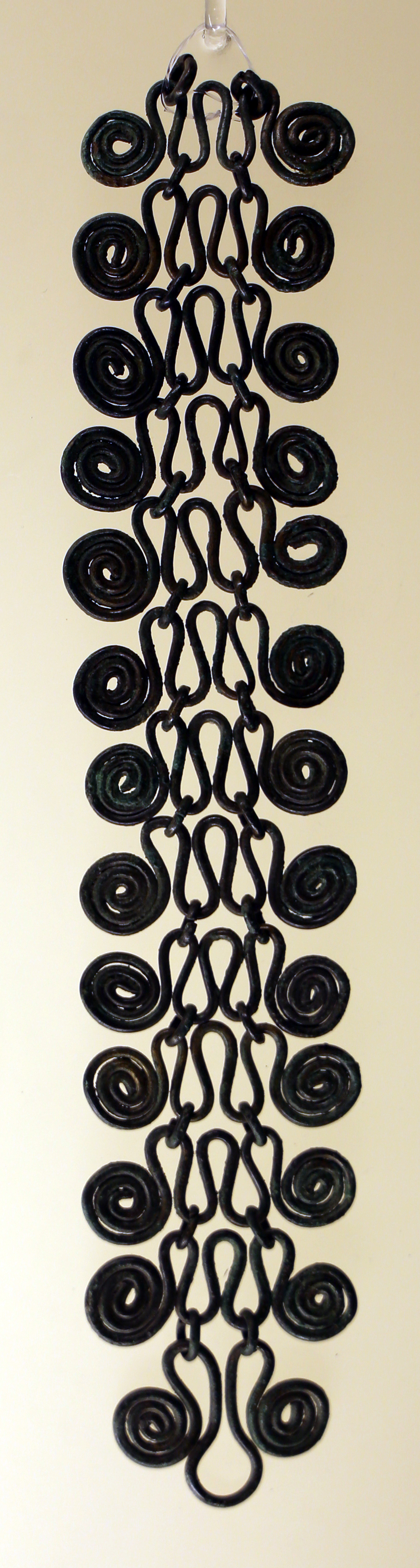
Iron Age, Piceni, Mid-Adriatic and Southern Italian jewellery, c. 800-690 BC, chain with spirals

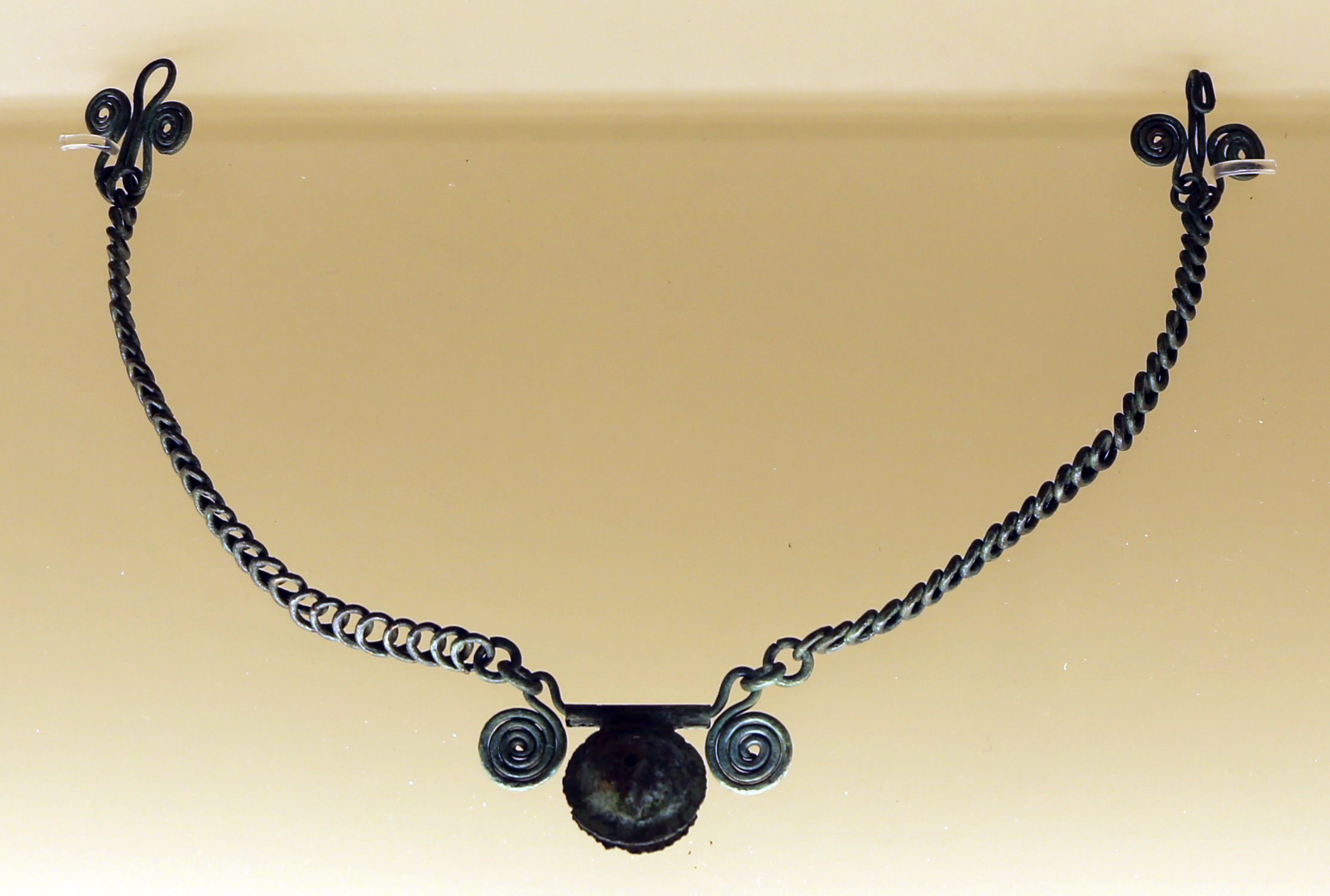
Iron Age, Piceni, Mid-Adriatic and Southern Italian jewellery, c. 800-690 BC, necklace 06

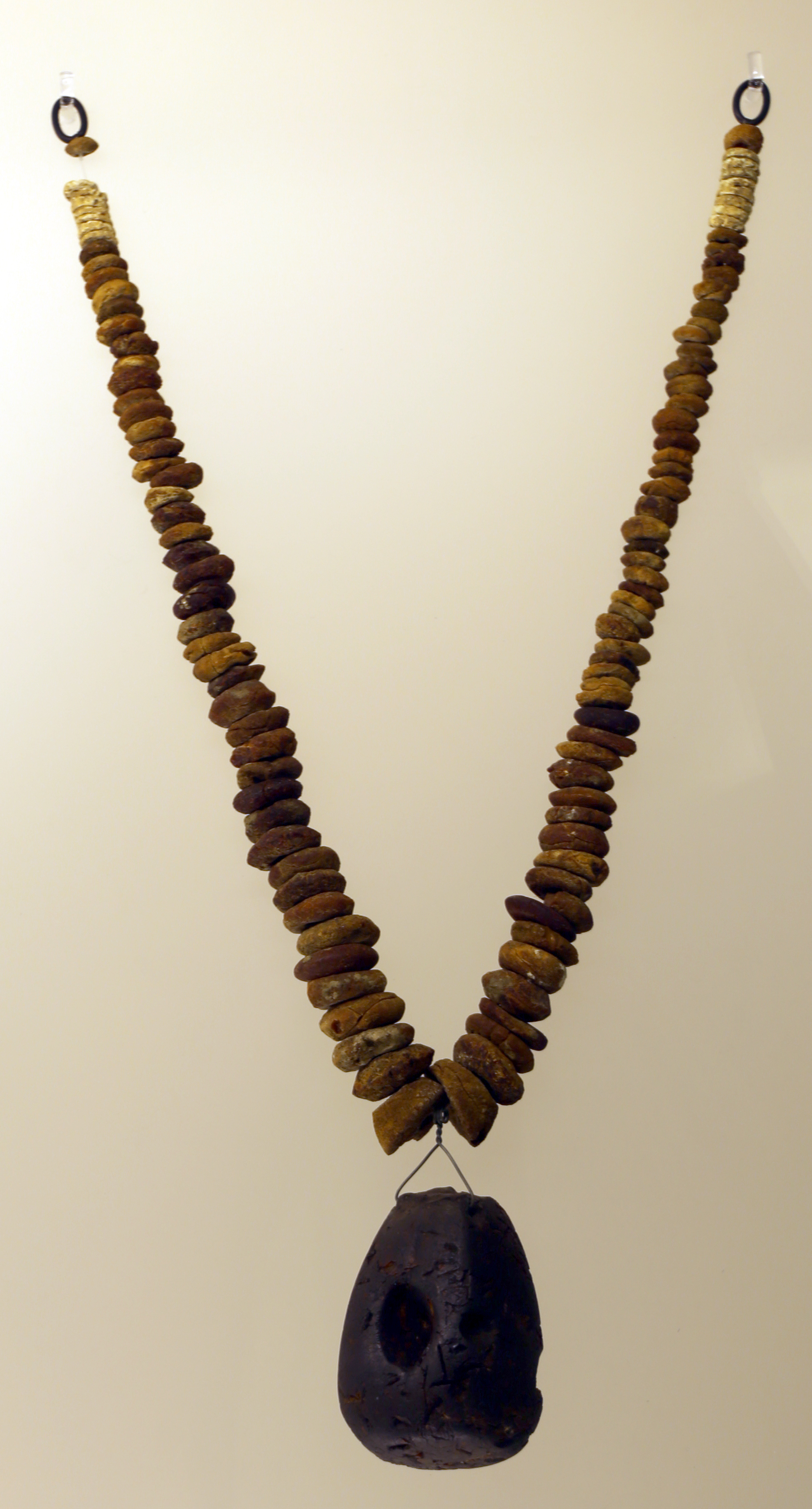
Iron Age, Piceno, mid-Adriatic and southern Italian jewellery, c. 800-690 BC, necklace with rings and large amber pendant

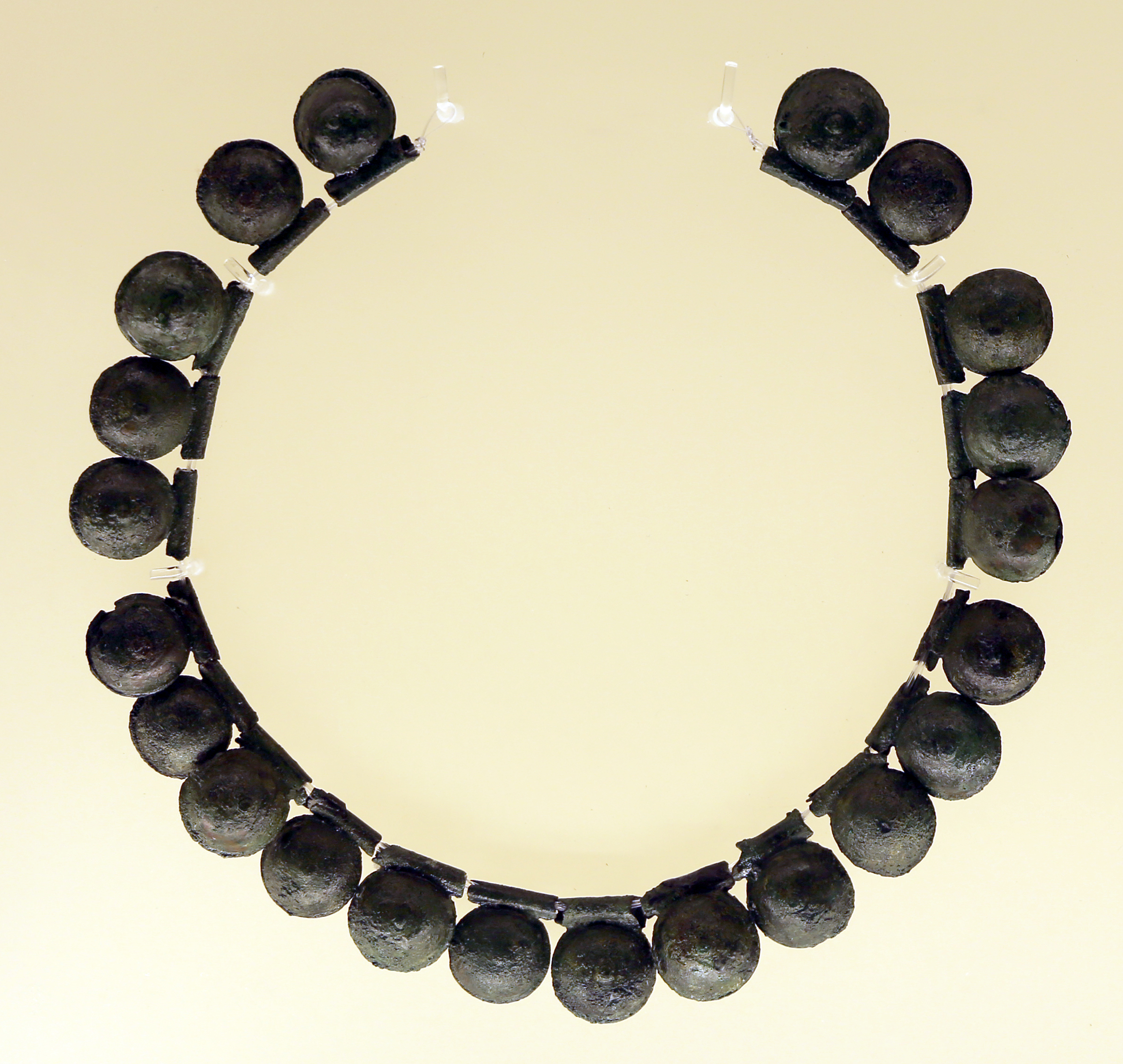
Iron Age, Piceni, Mid-Adriatic and Southern Italian jewellery, c. 800-690 BC, necklace with bulle

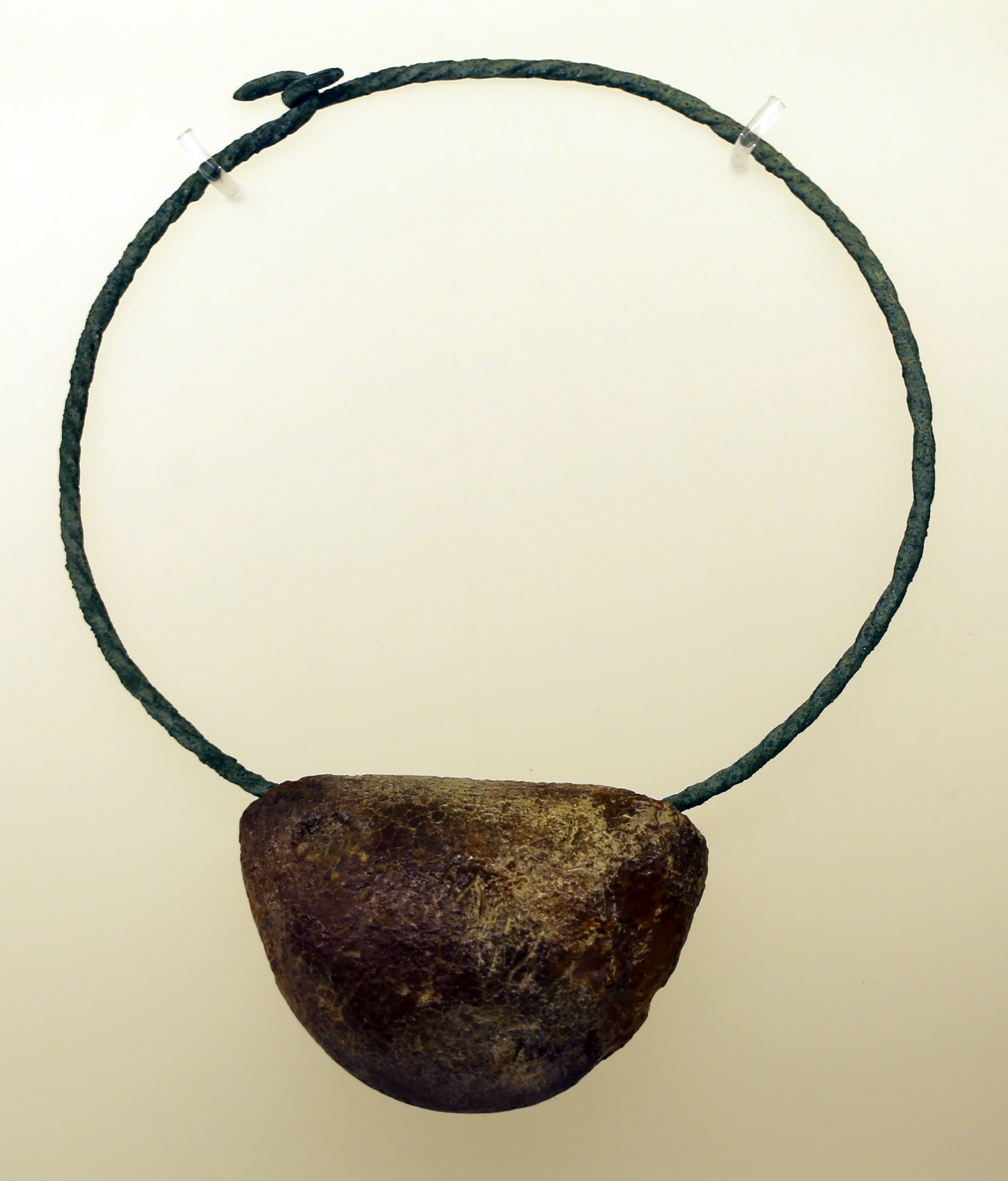
Iron Age, Piceno, mid-adriatic and southern Italian jewelry, c. 800-690 BC, necklace with large amber vague

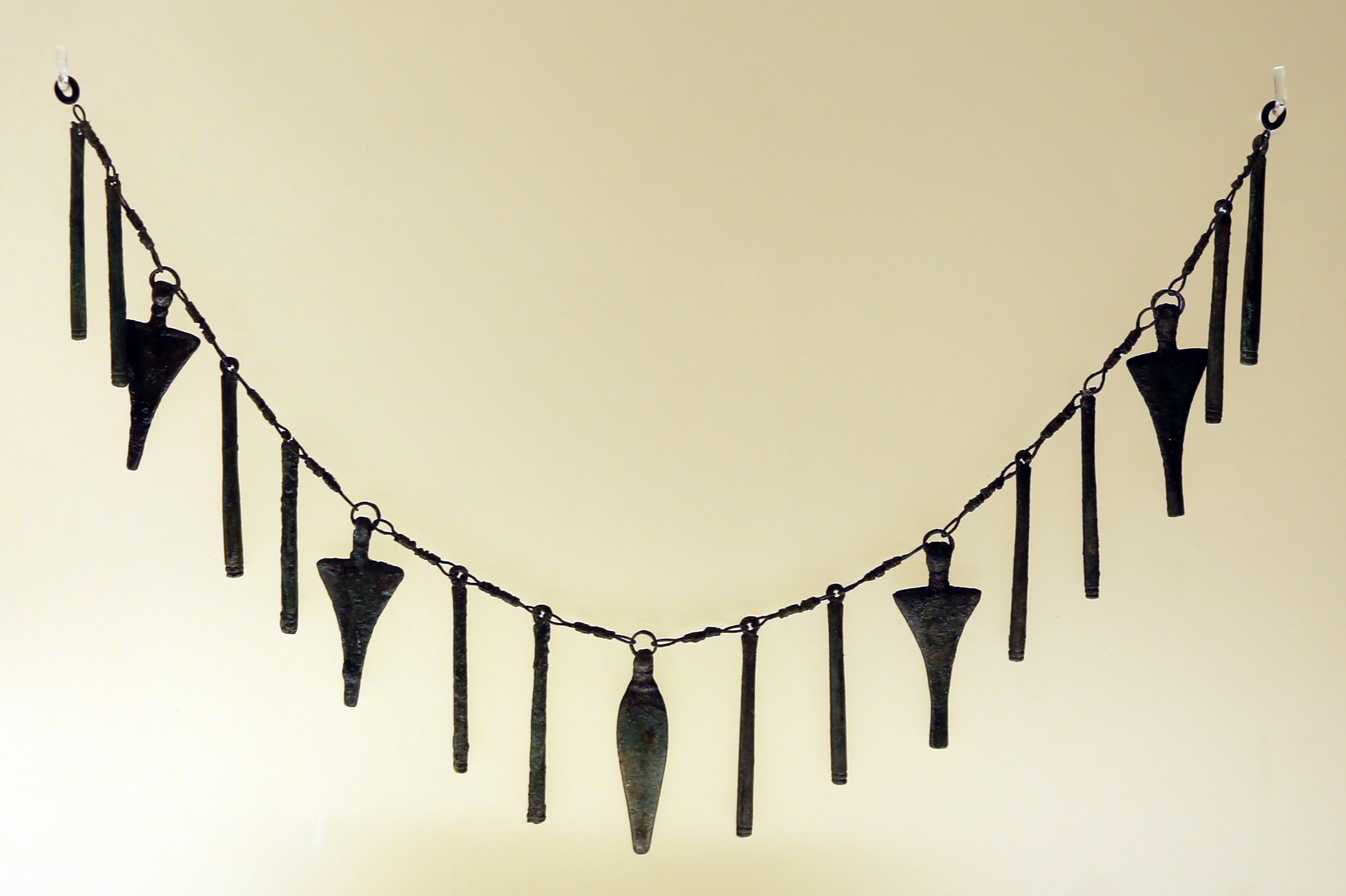
Iron Age, piceni, mid-adriatic and southern Italy jewelry, c.800-690 bc, necklace with arrowhead pendants, from norcia

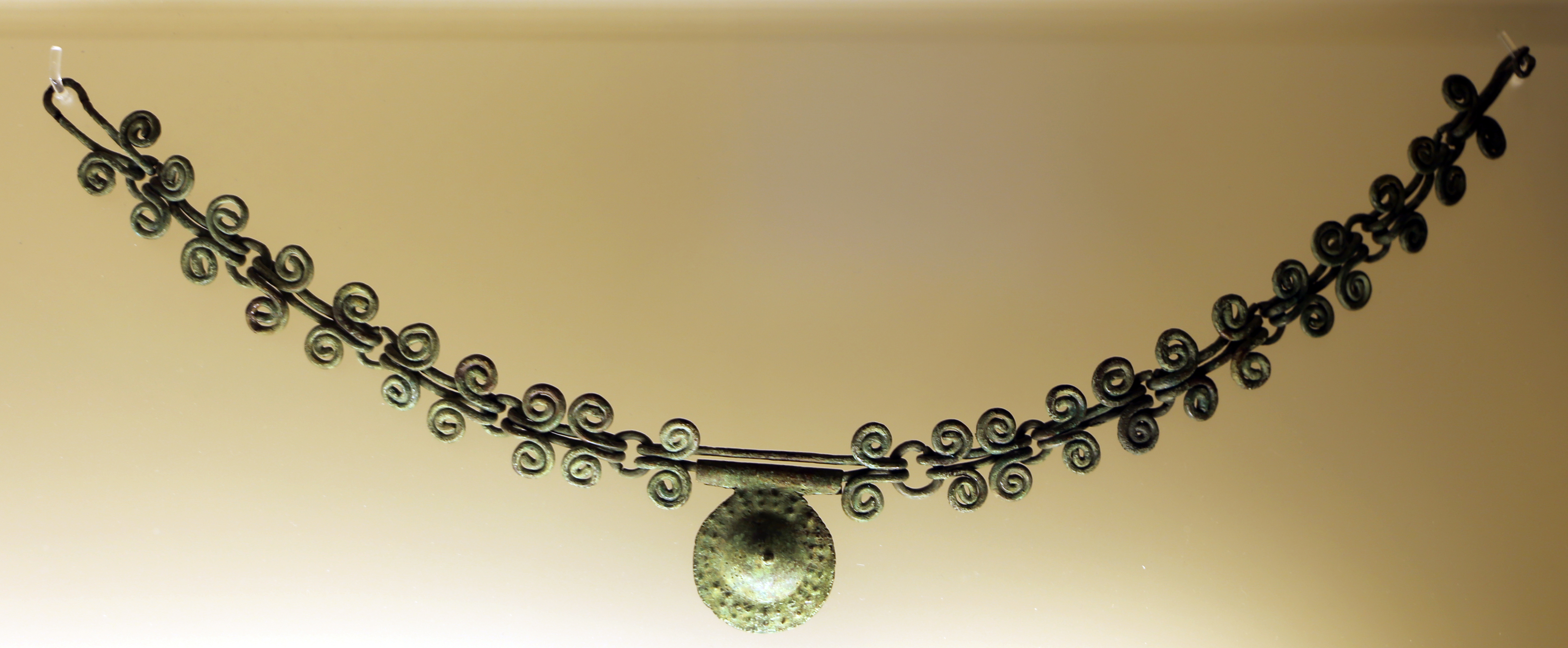
Iron Age, Piceno, mid-adriatic and southern Italy jewellery, c. 800-690 BC, necklace with spirals

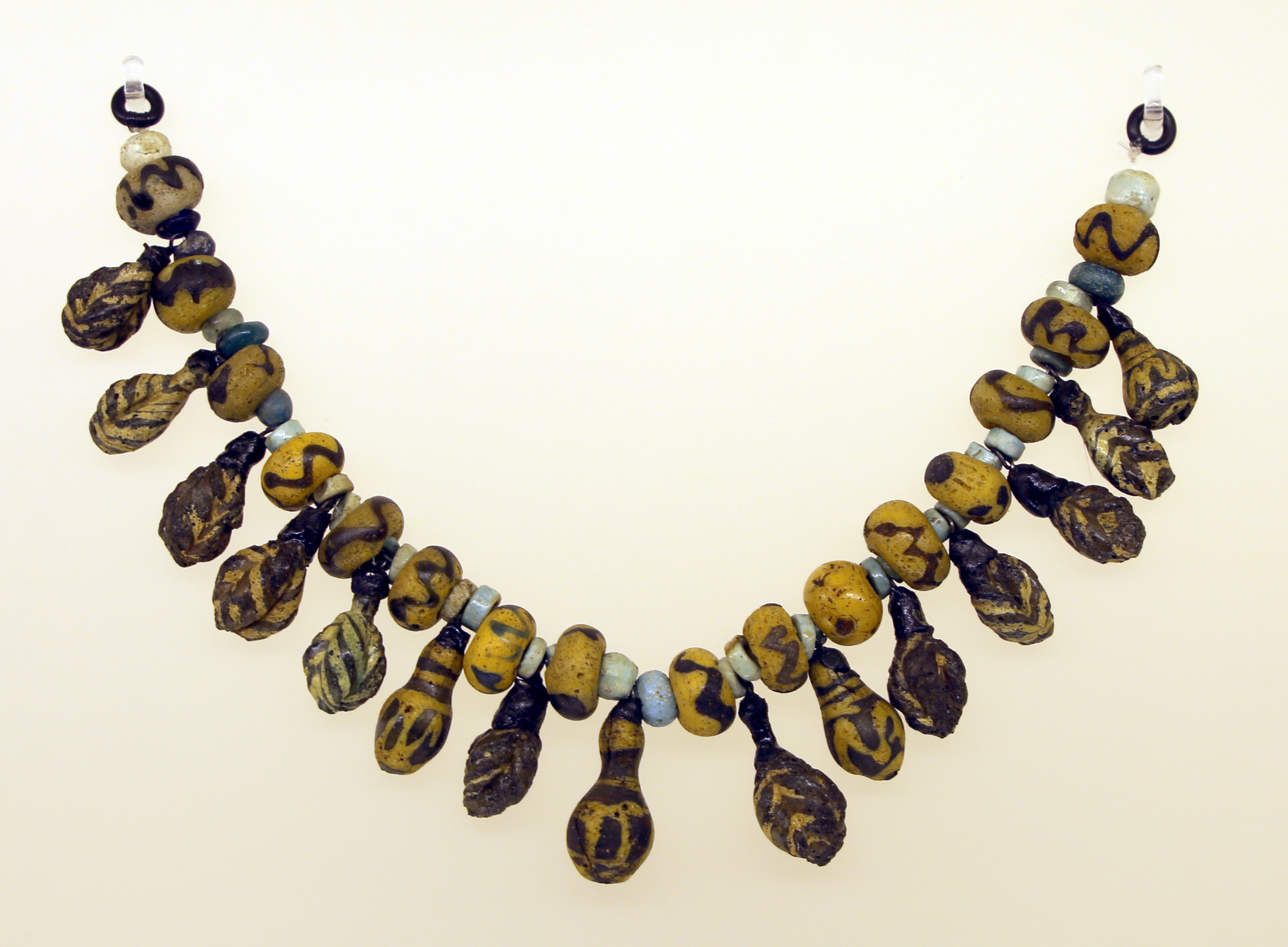
Iron Age, Piceni, Mid-Adriatic and Southern Italian jewellery, c. 800-690 BC, glass paste necklace 01

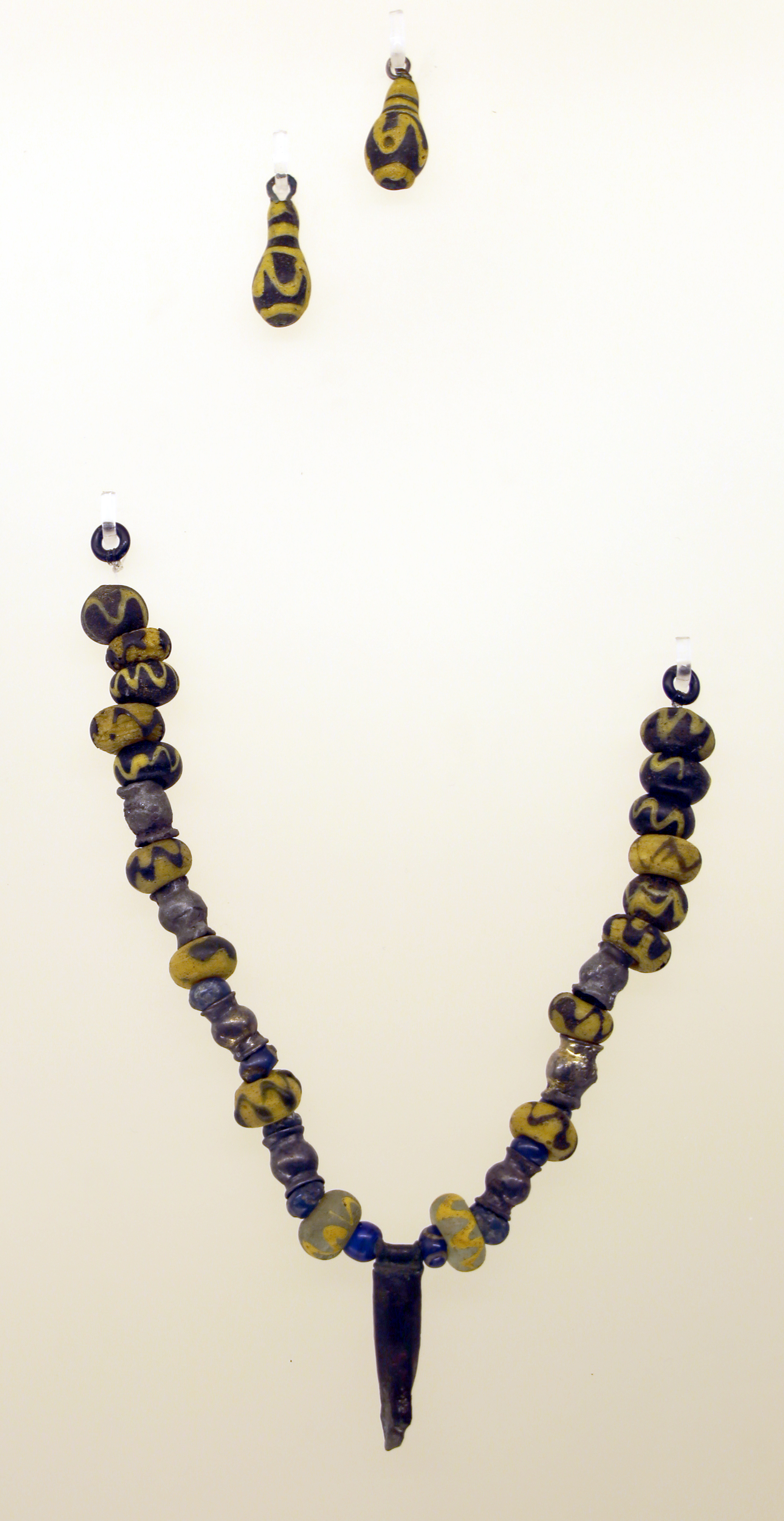
Iron Age, Piceni, Mid-Adriatic and Southern Italian jewellery, c. 800-690 BC, glass paste necklace 02

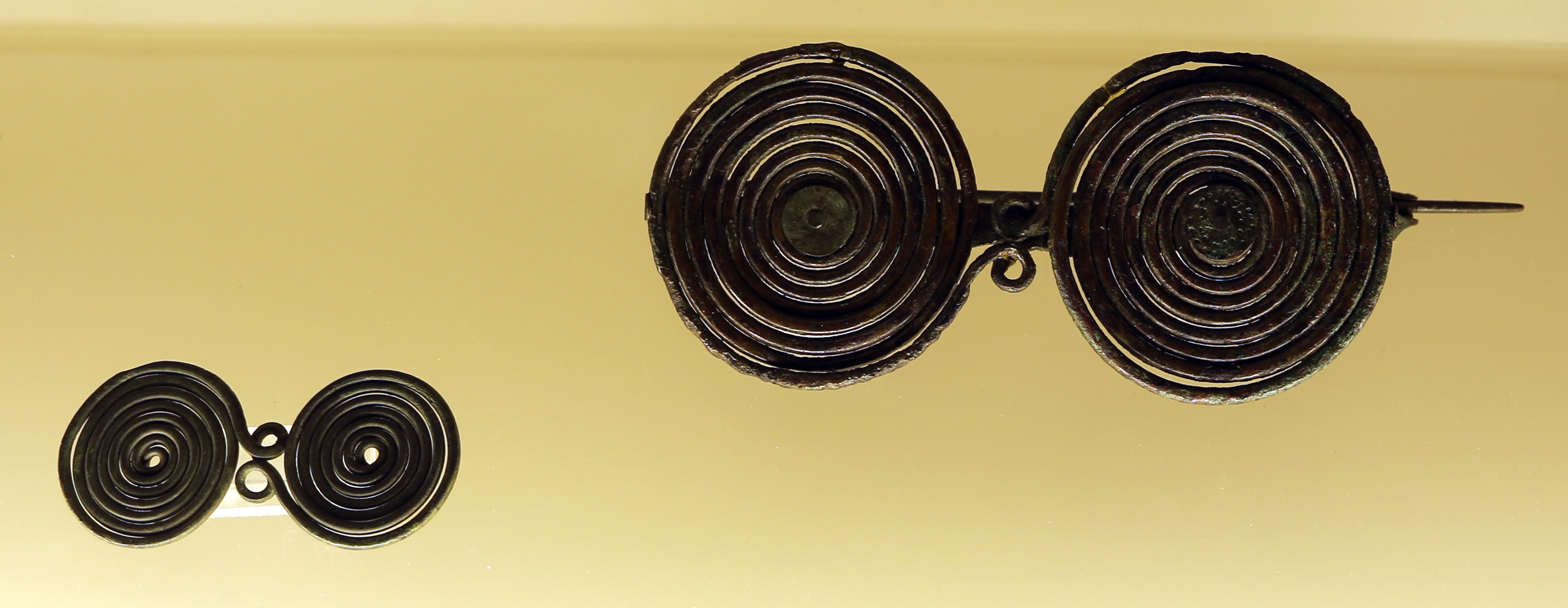
Iron Age, Piceni, Mid-Adriatic and Southern Italian jewellery, c. 800-690 BC, eyeglass fibulae

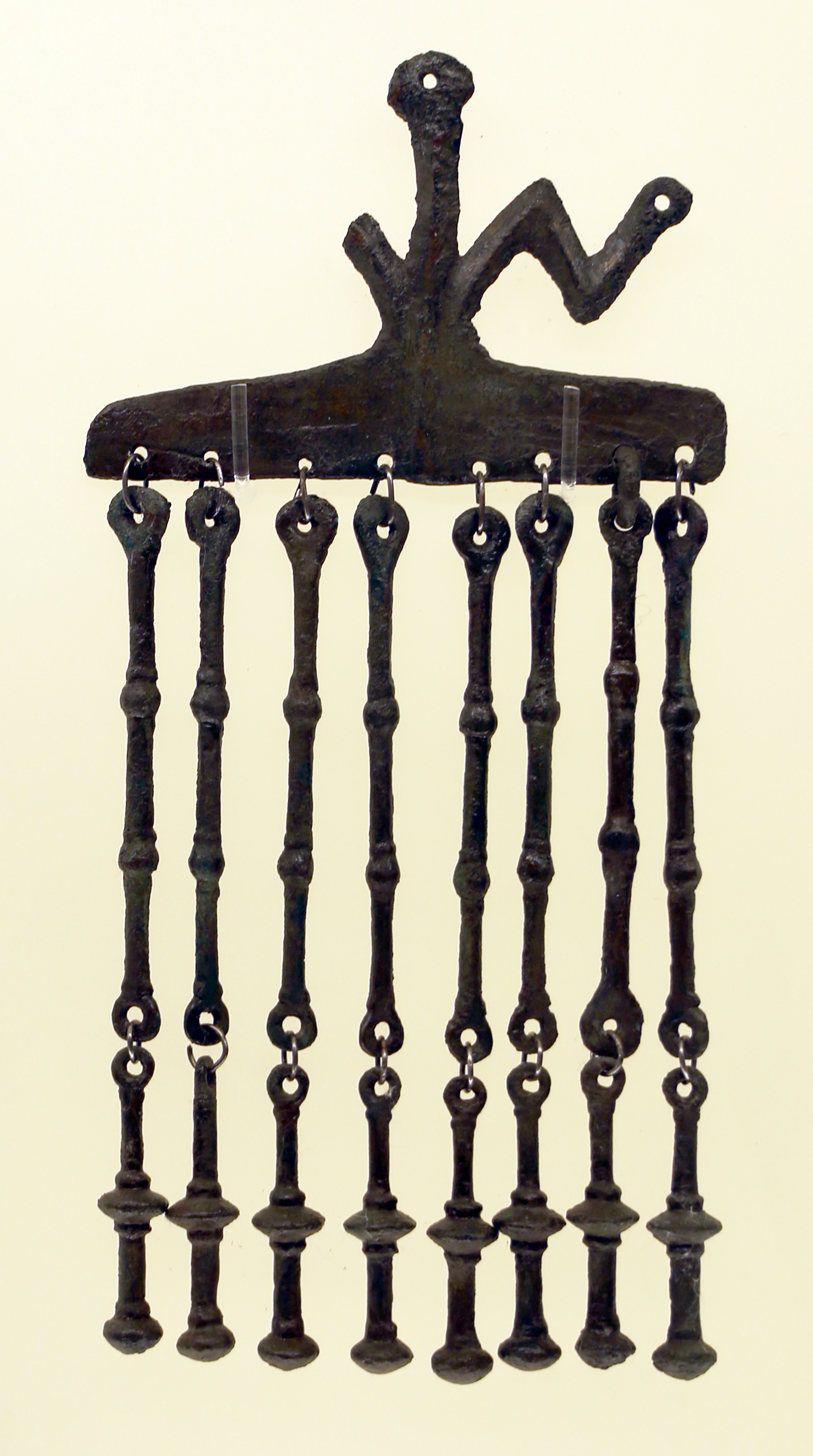
Iron Age, Piceni, Mid-Adriatic and Southern Italian jewellery, c. 800-690 BC, pendant 01

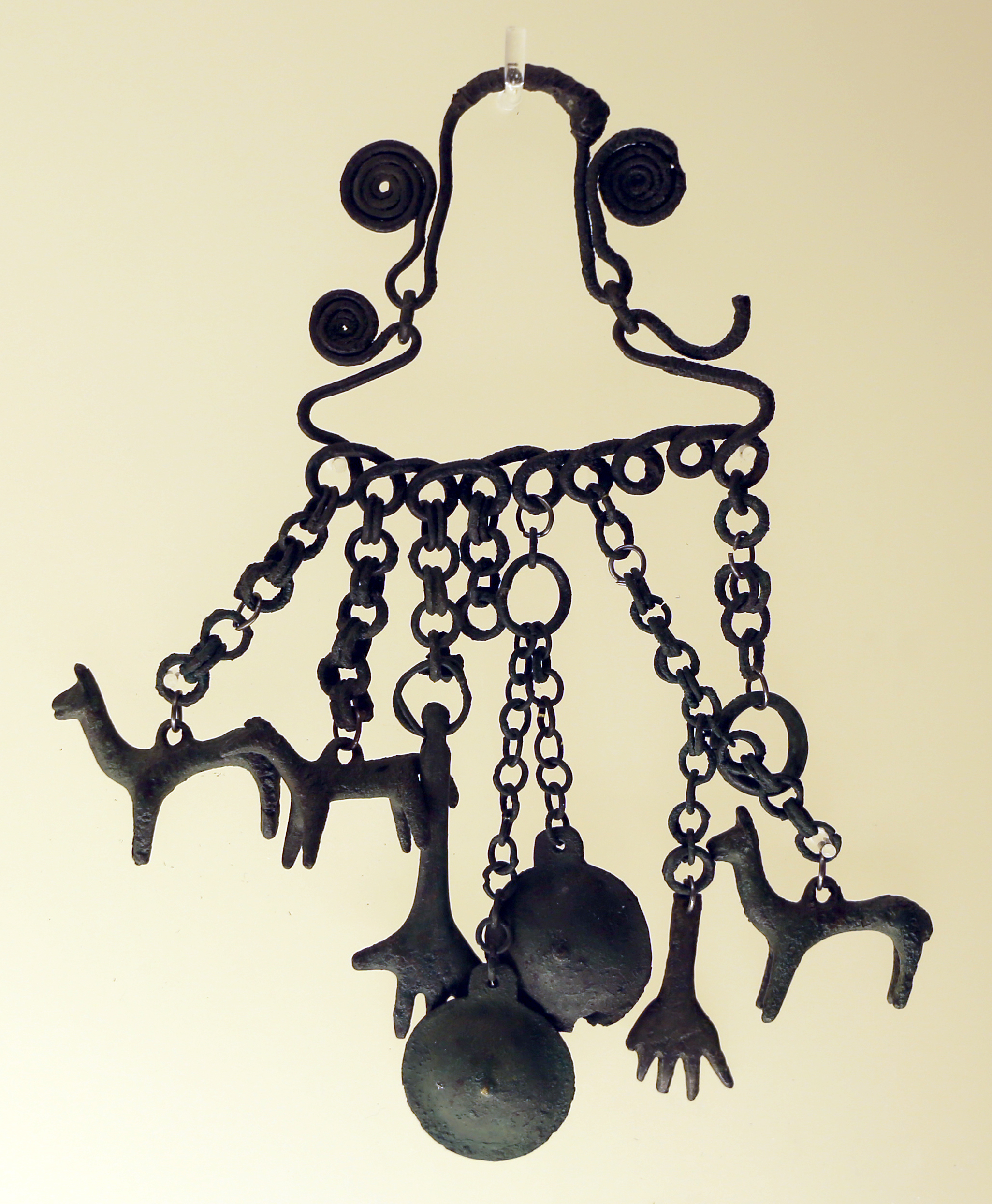
Iron Age, Piceni, Mid-Adriatic and Southern Italian jewellery, c.800-690 BC, pendant with horses, bulles and hands

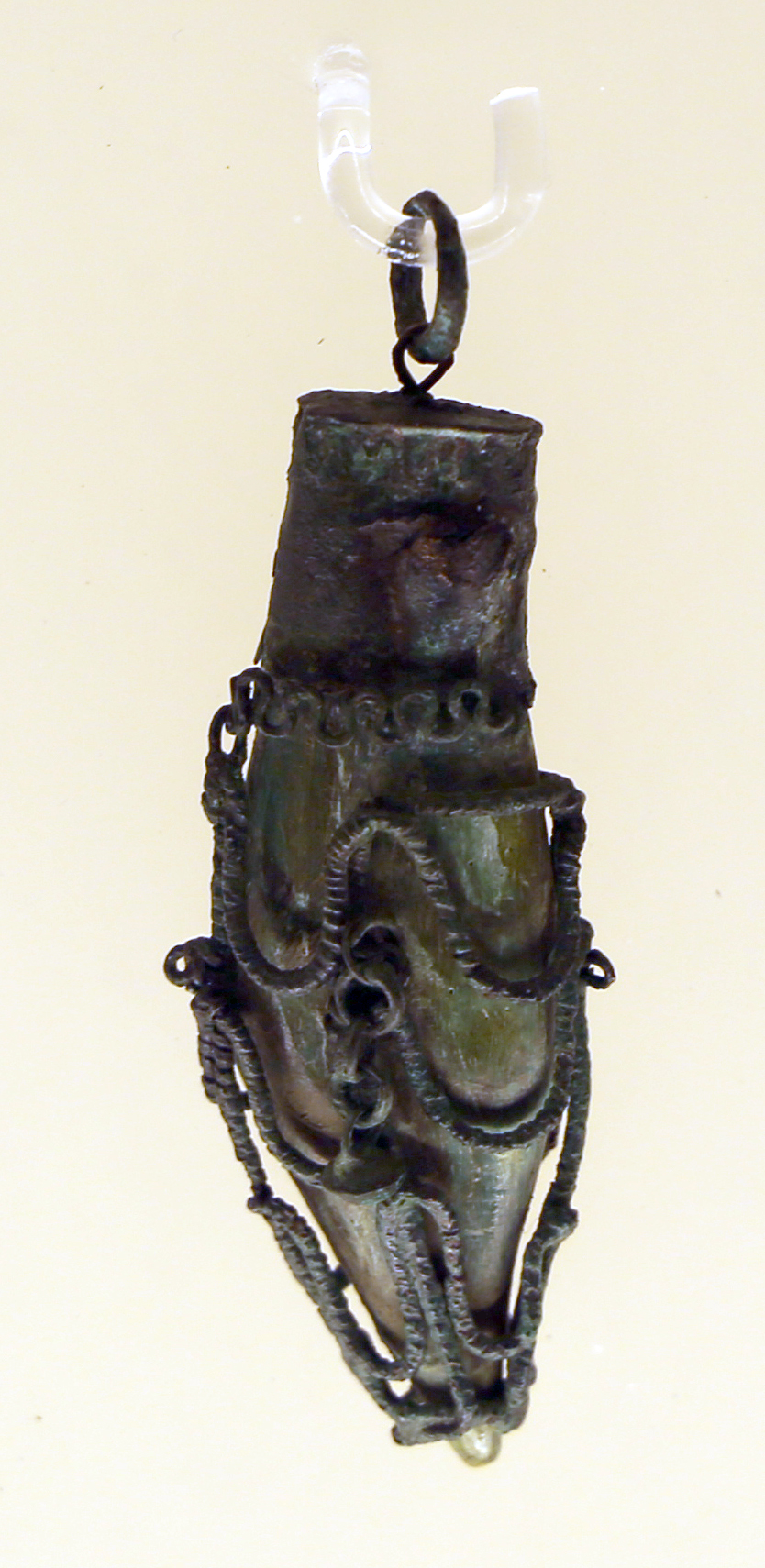
Iron Age, Piceni, Mid-Adriatic and Southern Italian jewellery, c. 800-690 BC, pendant 01

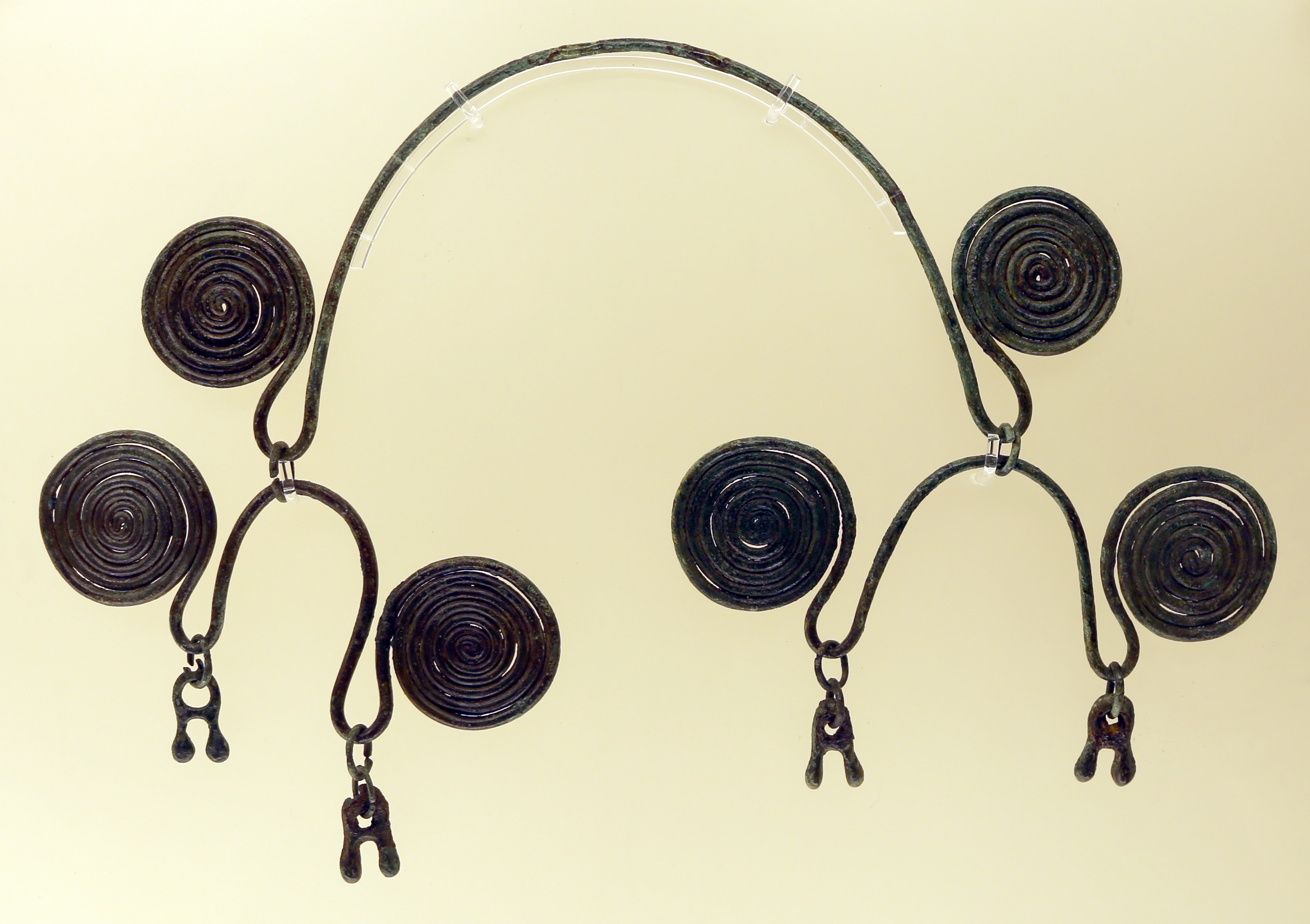
Iron Age, Piceno, Mid-Adriatic and Southern Italian jewellery, c. 800-690 BC, breastplate with pendants

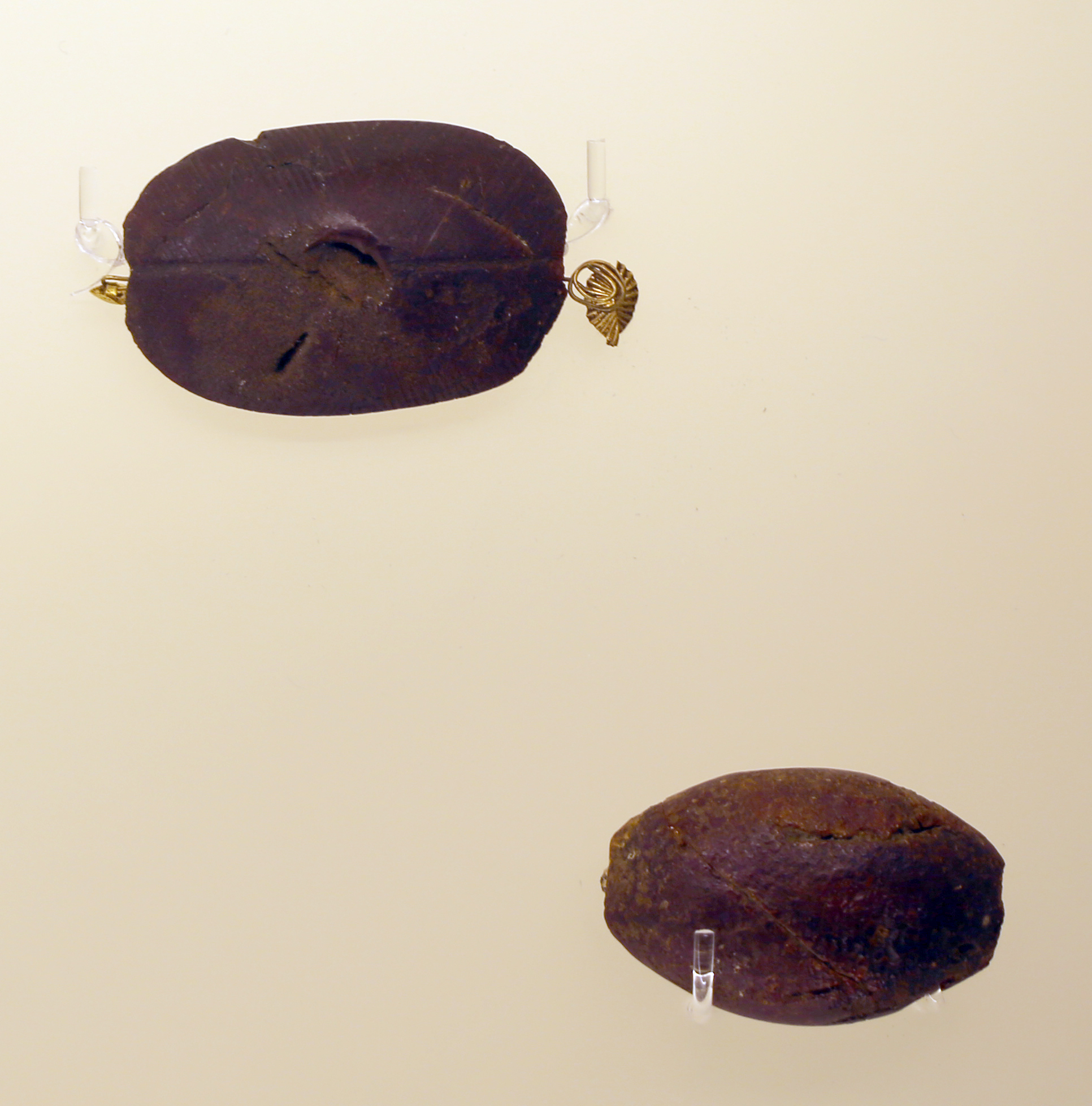
Iron Age, Piceni, Mid-Adriatic and Southern Italian jewellery, c. 800-690 BC, amber vague

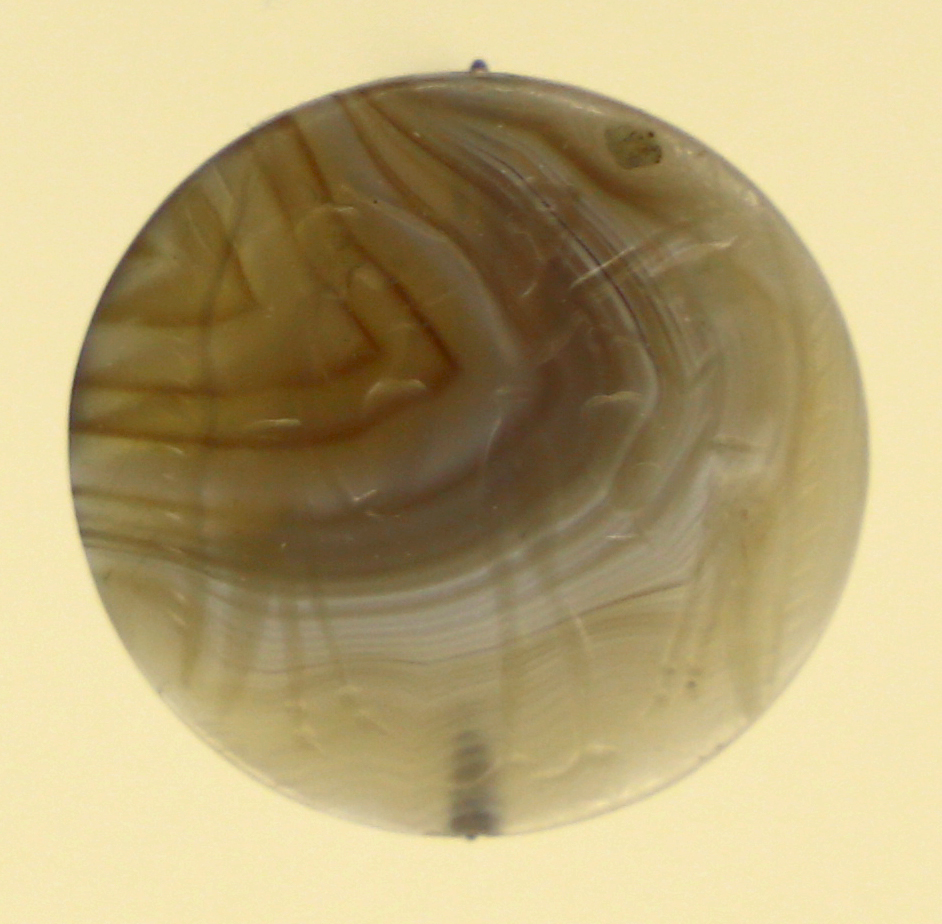
Minoan gem with man with open arms between two animal-headed figures carrying amphorae, from tarquinia, 15th-14th century BC

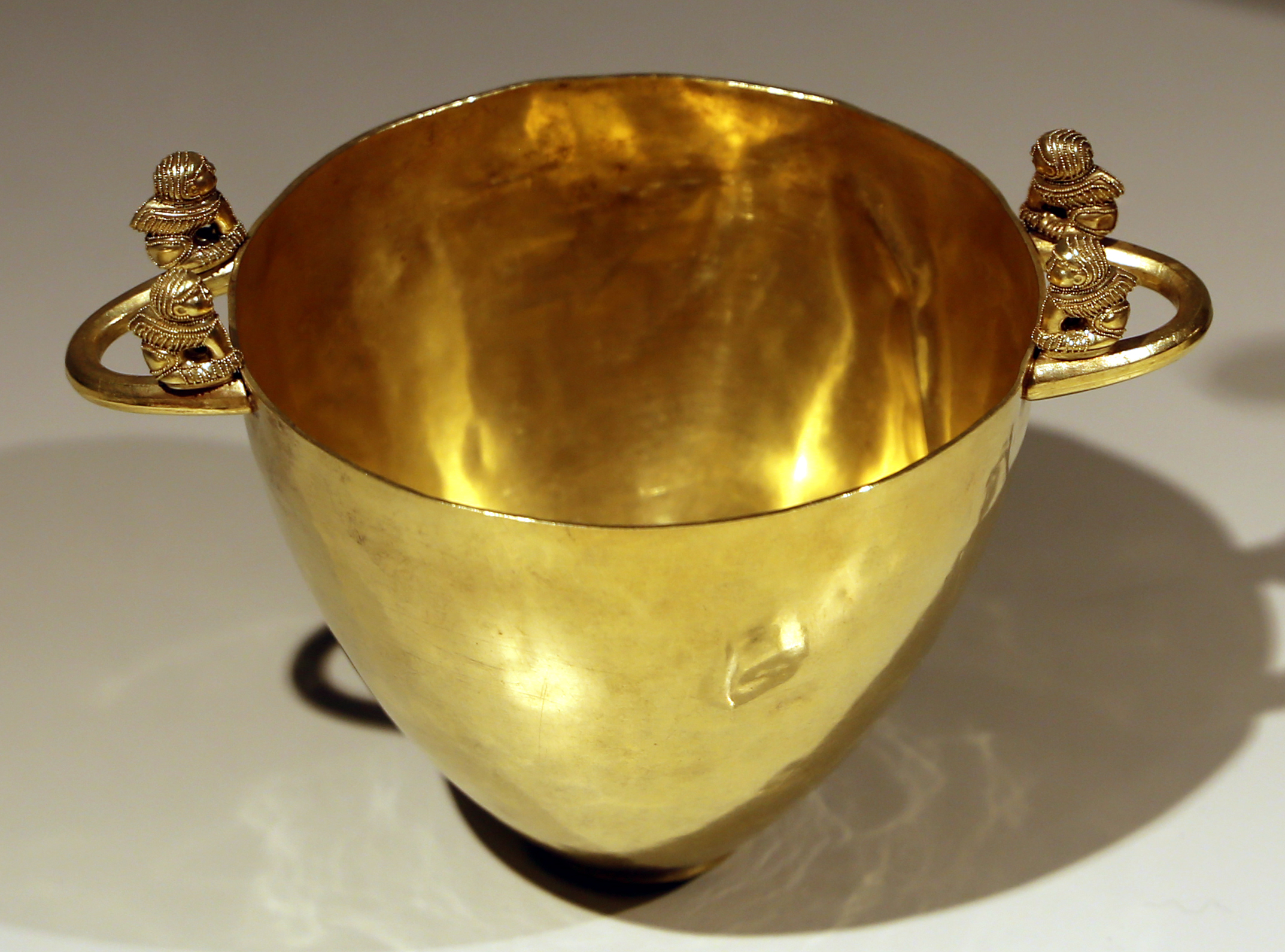
Kotyle in gold with pairs of sphinxes, c. 675-650 BC, from the bernardini tomb in the necr. of the colombella in palestrina

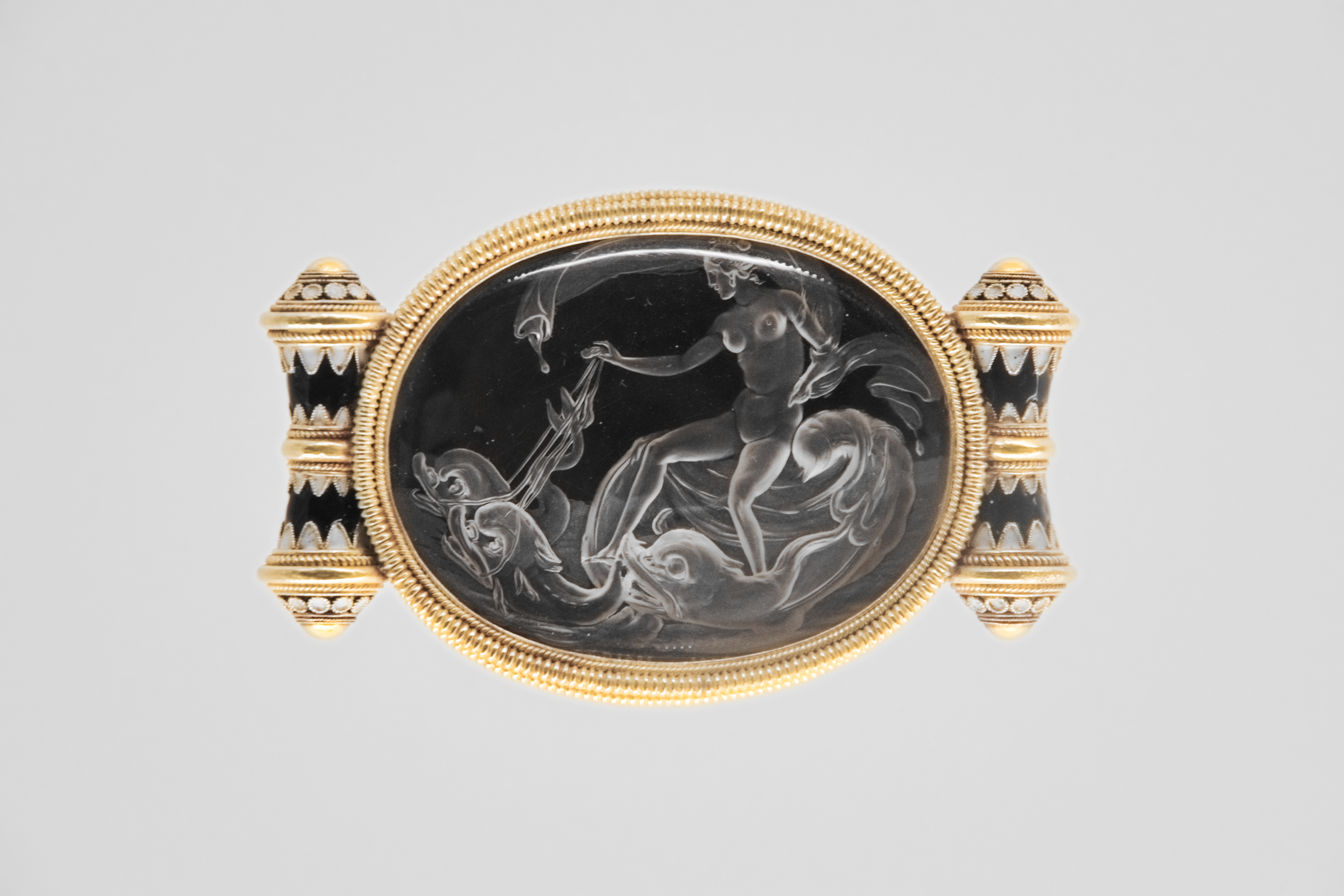
Etruscan-museum-of-villa-giulia --- ori-castellani --- cameo 32476200292 o

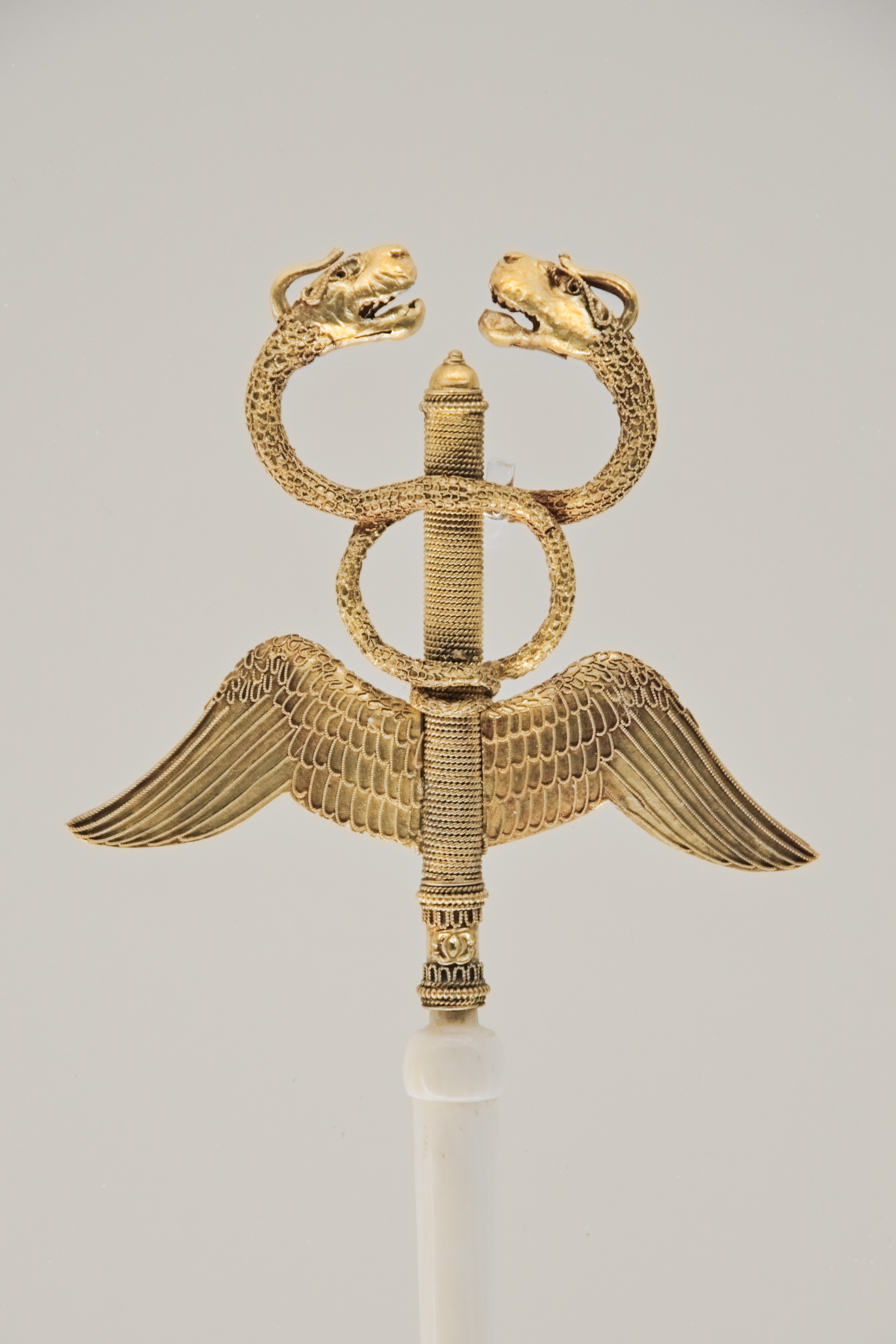
Etruscan-museum-of-villa-giulia --- ori-castellani-etruscan-brooch 32627086395 o

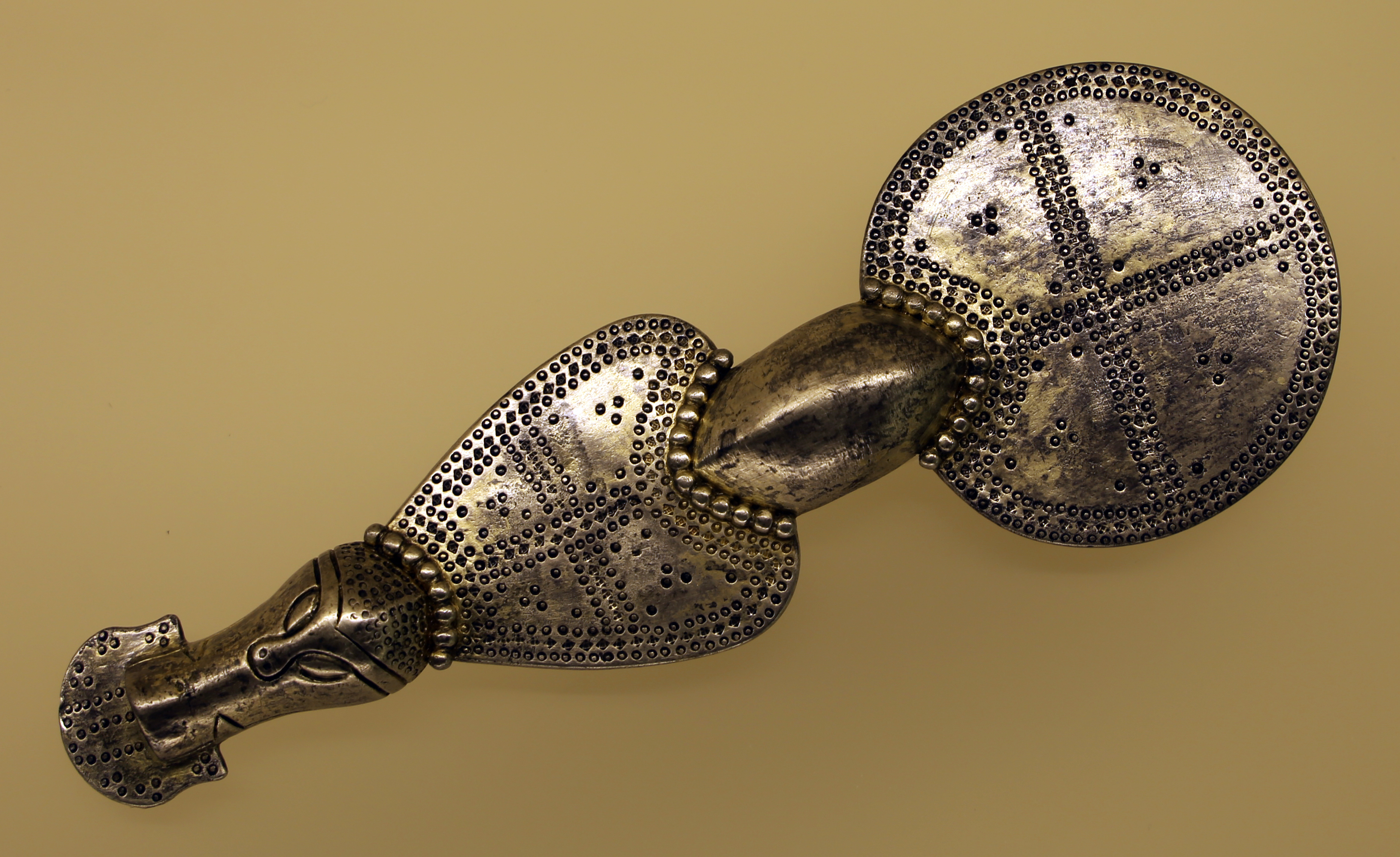
Early medieval goldsmiths, approx. 590 AD, large stirrup fibula, from rieti

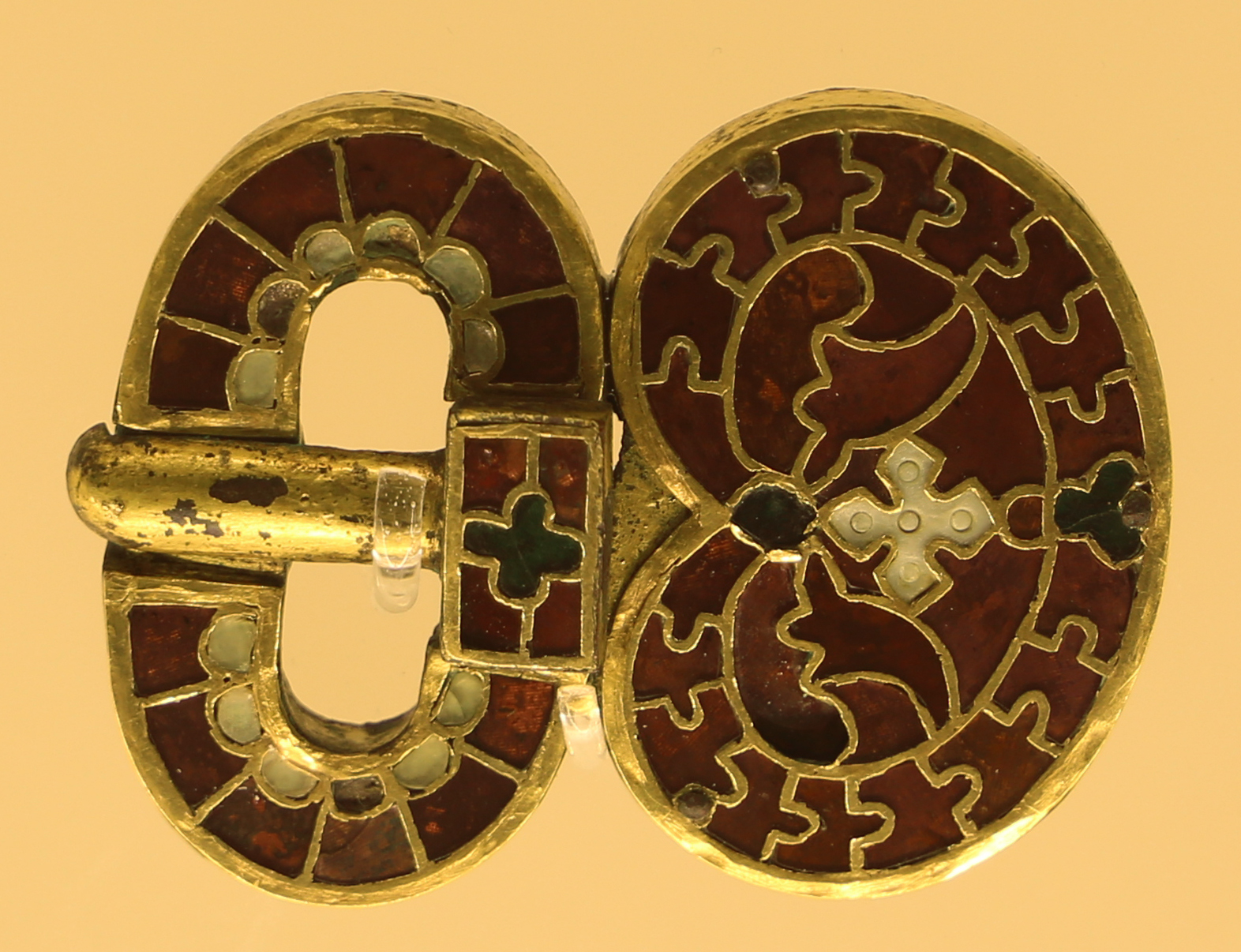
Early medieval goldsmiths, Goths, belt buckle with cloisonné almandins on gold leaf, c. 490 AD. 02

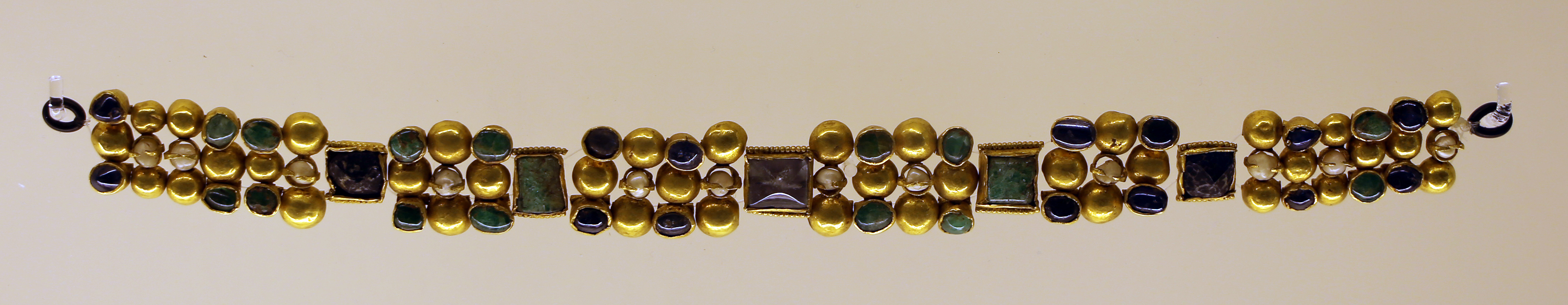
Early medieval jewellery, 5th-7th century, bracelet with globules

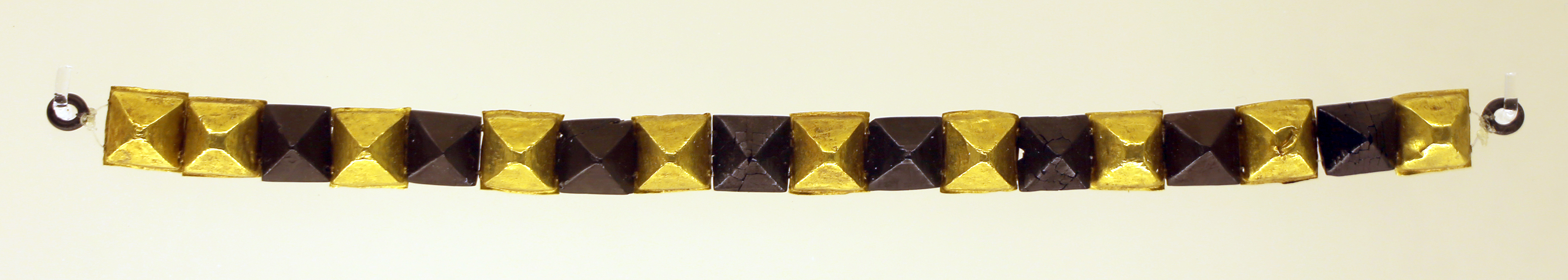
Early medieval jewellery, 5th-7th century, bracelet with small pyramids

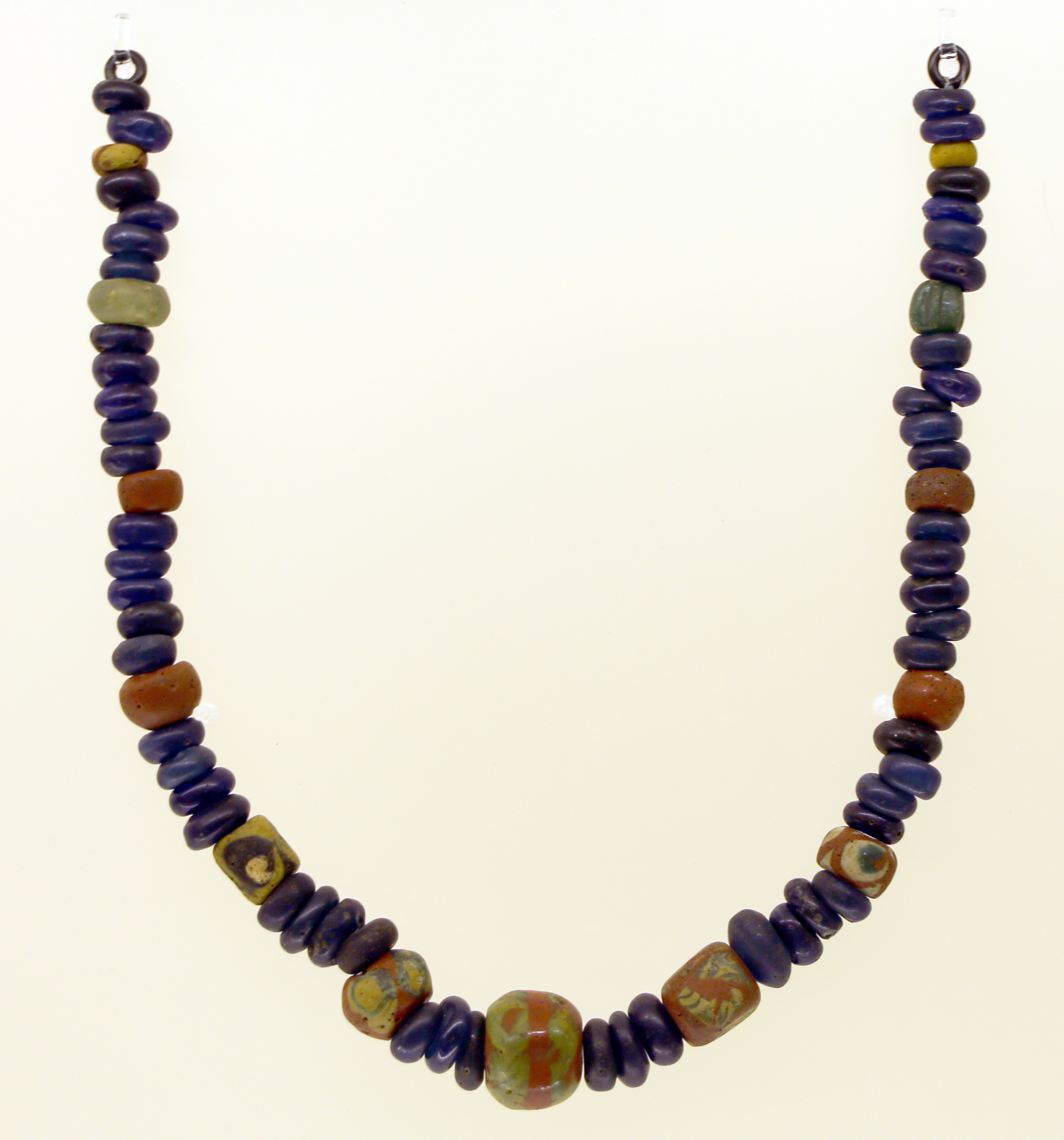
Early medieval jewellery, 5th-7th century, glass paste necklace

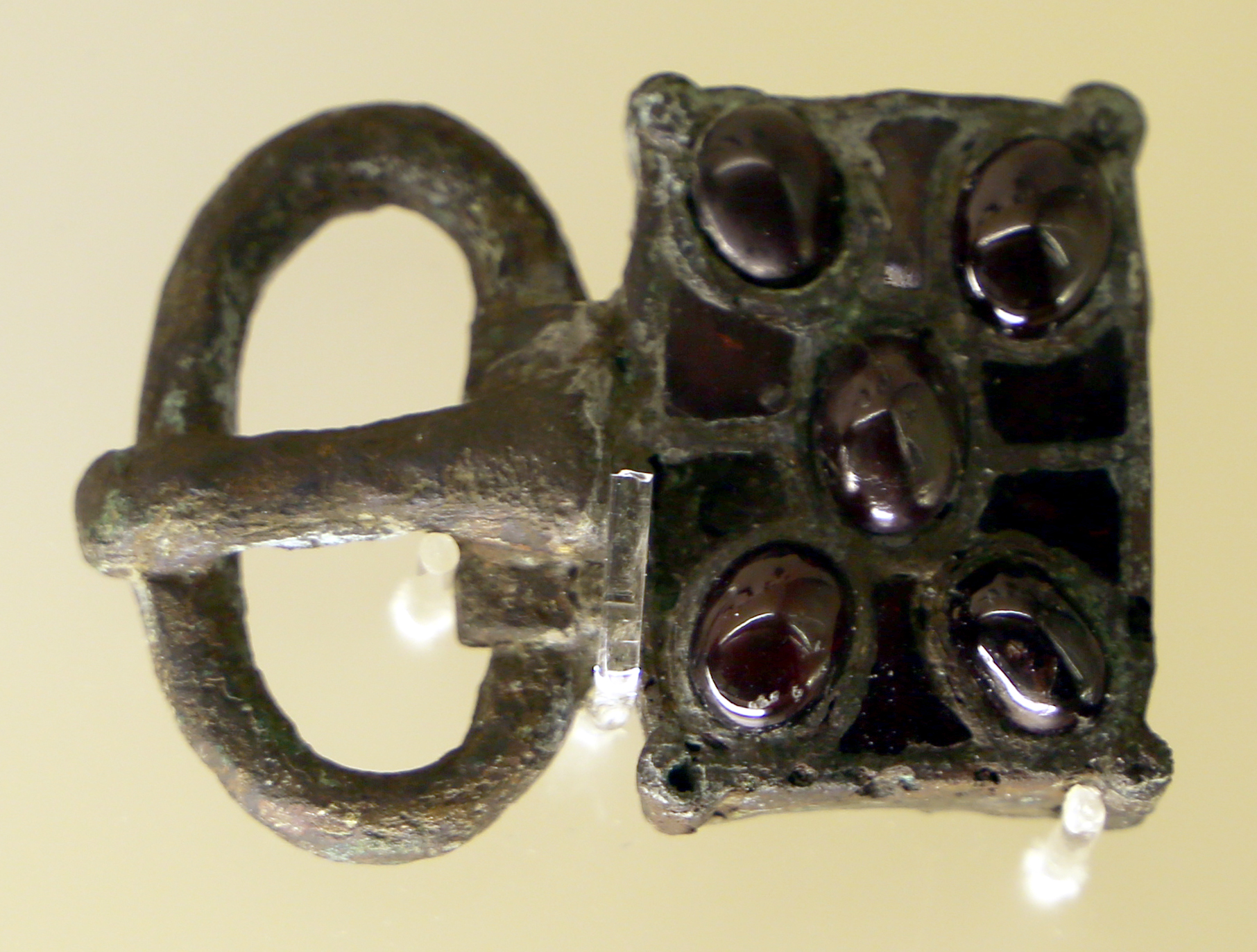
Early medieval jewellery, 5th-7th century, belt buckle 06

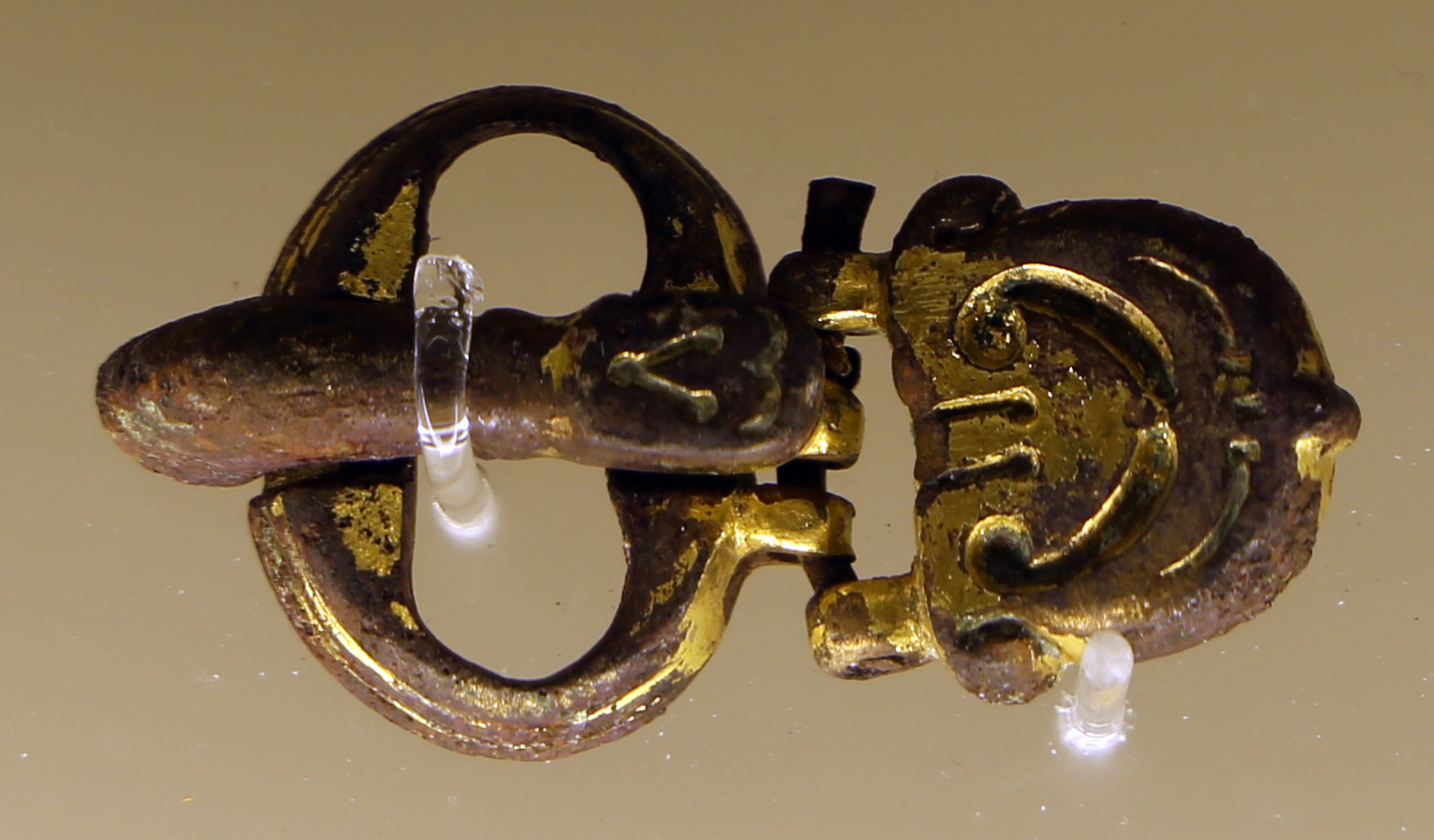
Early medieval jewellery, 5th-7th century, belt buckle with almandines 03

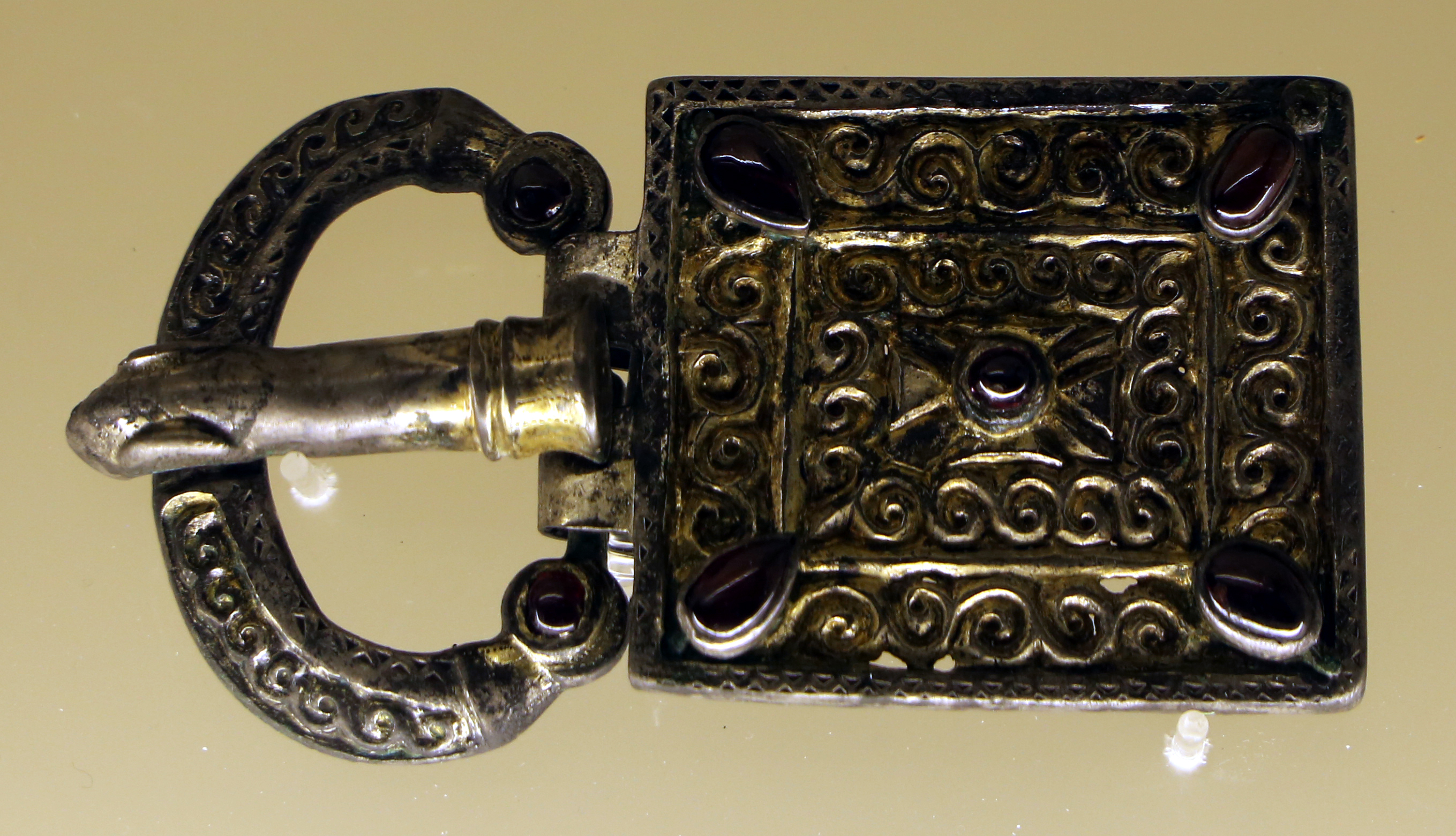
Early medieval jewellery, 5th-7th century, belt buckle with drop almandines, from barete (AQ) 01

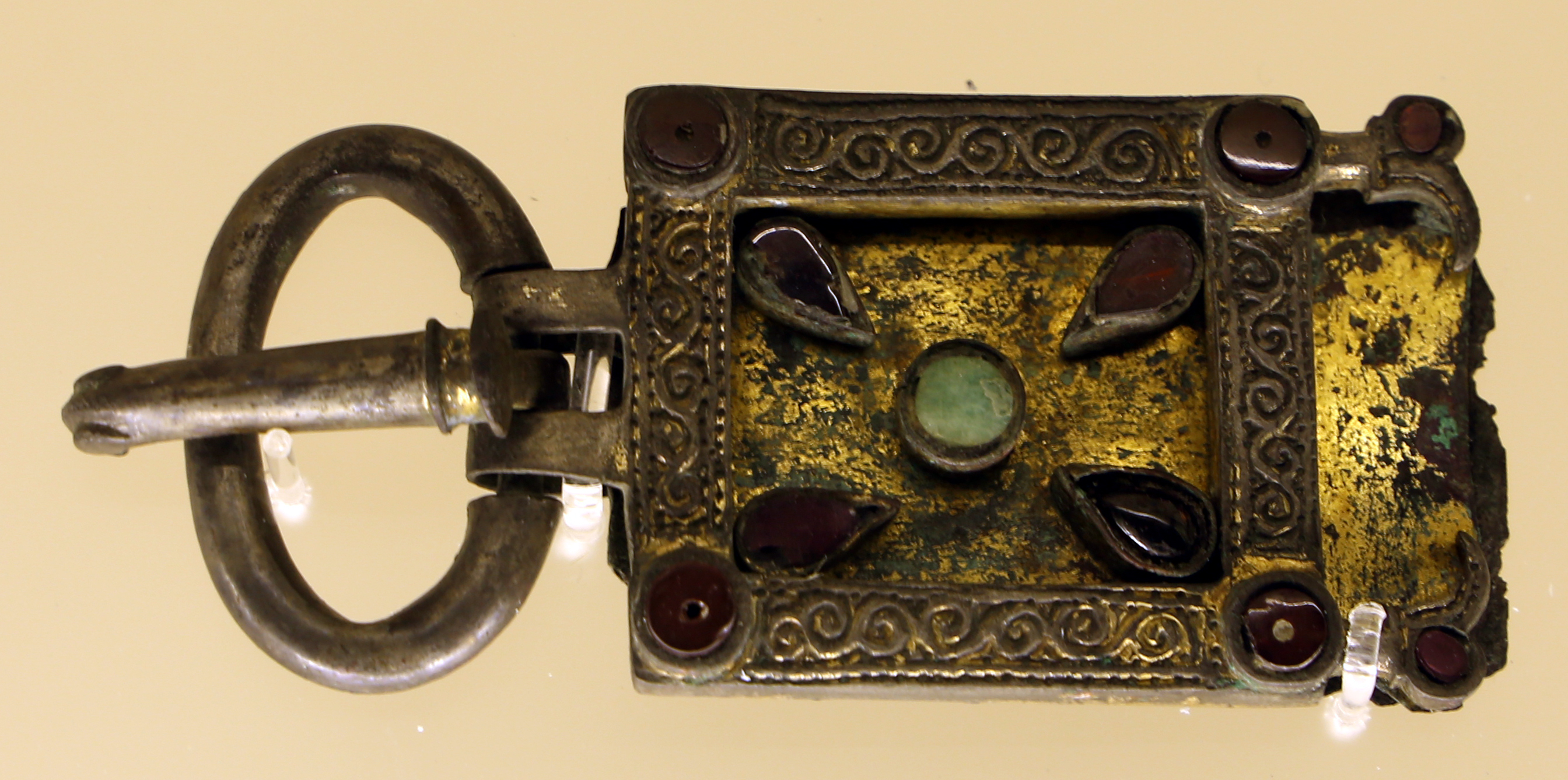
Early medieval jewellery, 5th-7th century, belt buckle with drop almandines, from barete (AQ) 02

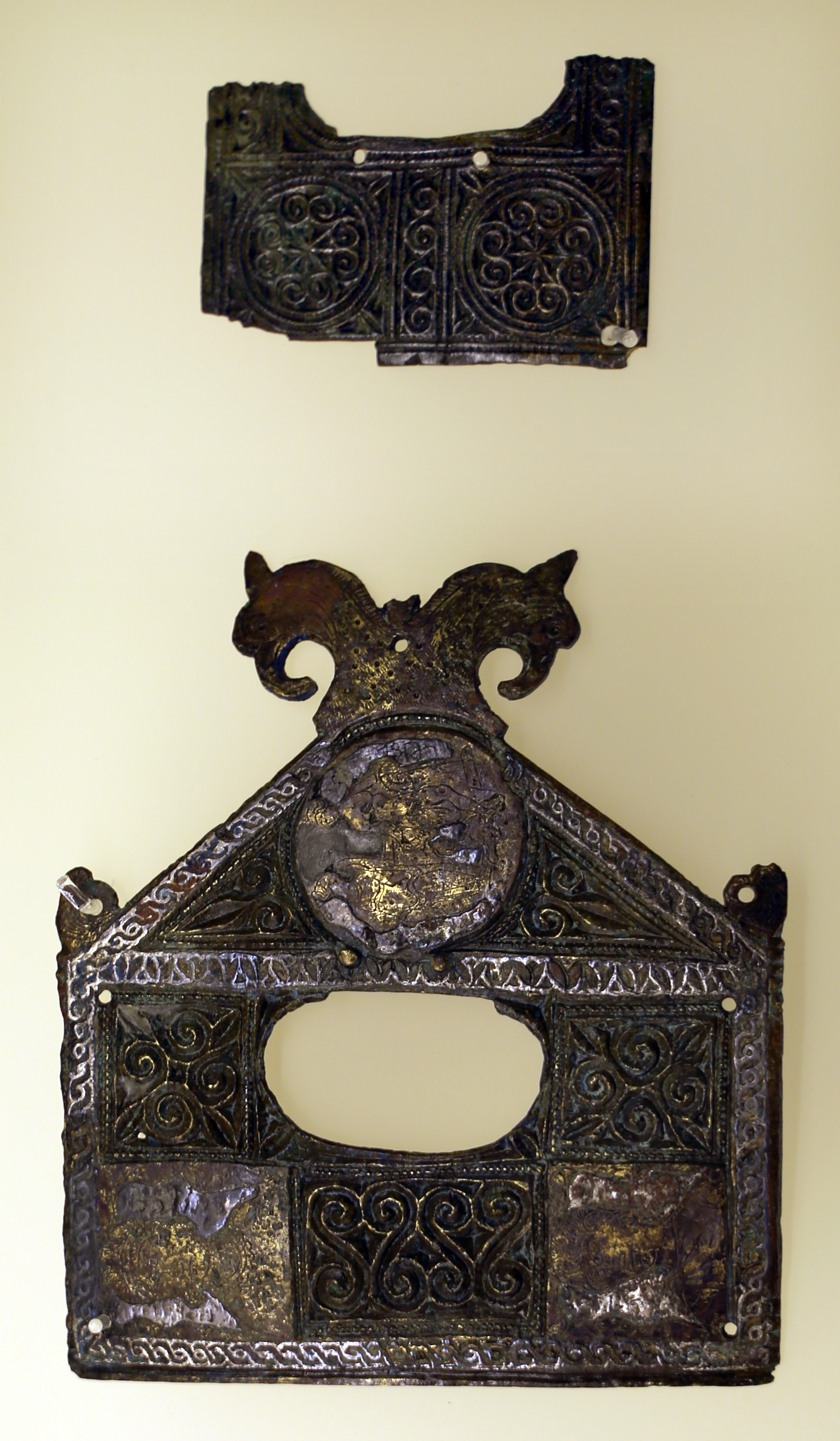
Early medieval jewellery, 5th-7th century, belt buckle

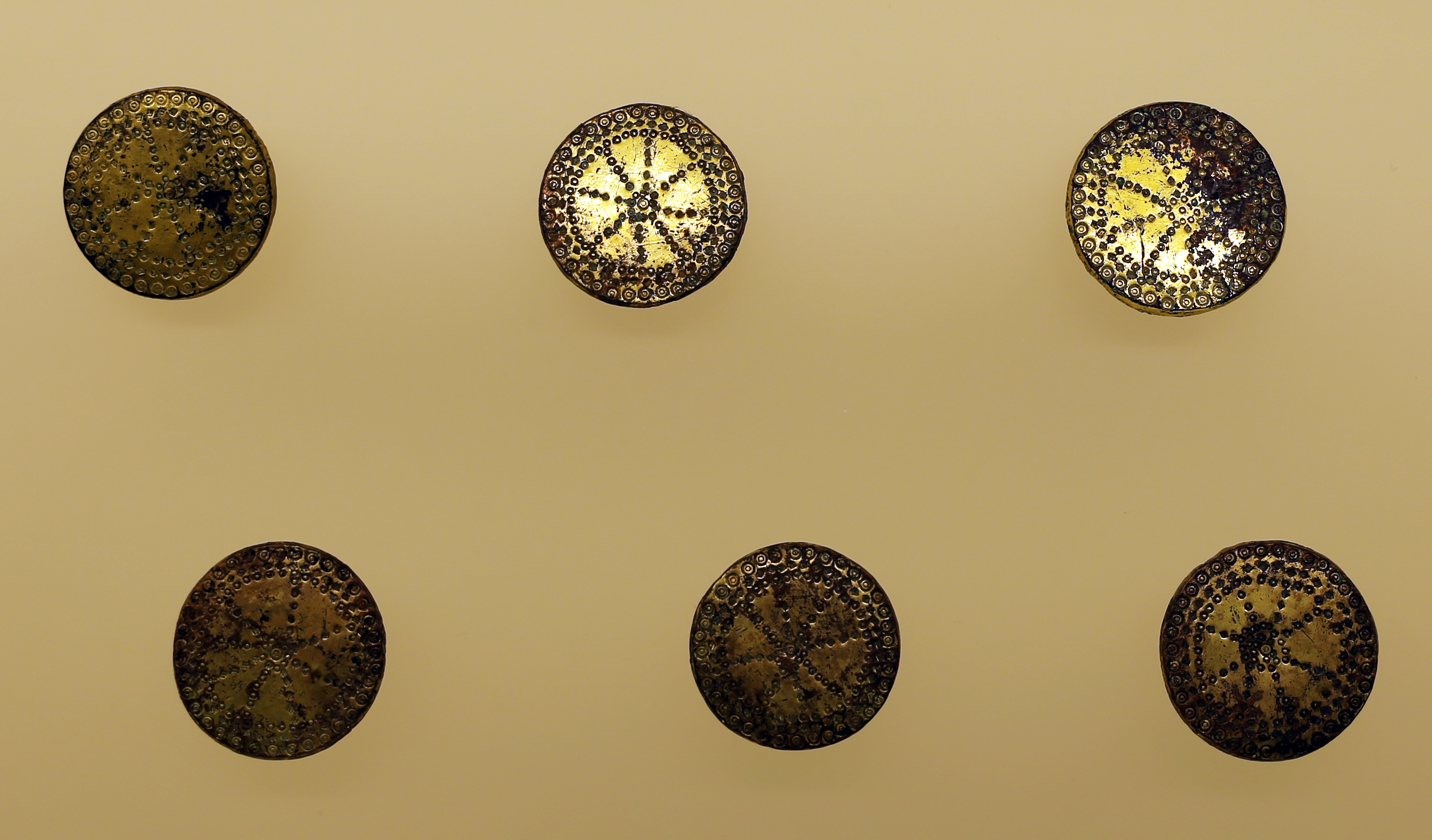
Early medieval jewellery, 5th-7th century, disc fibulae

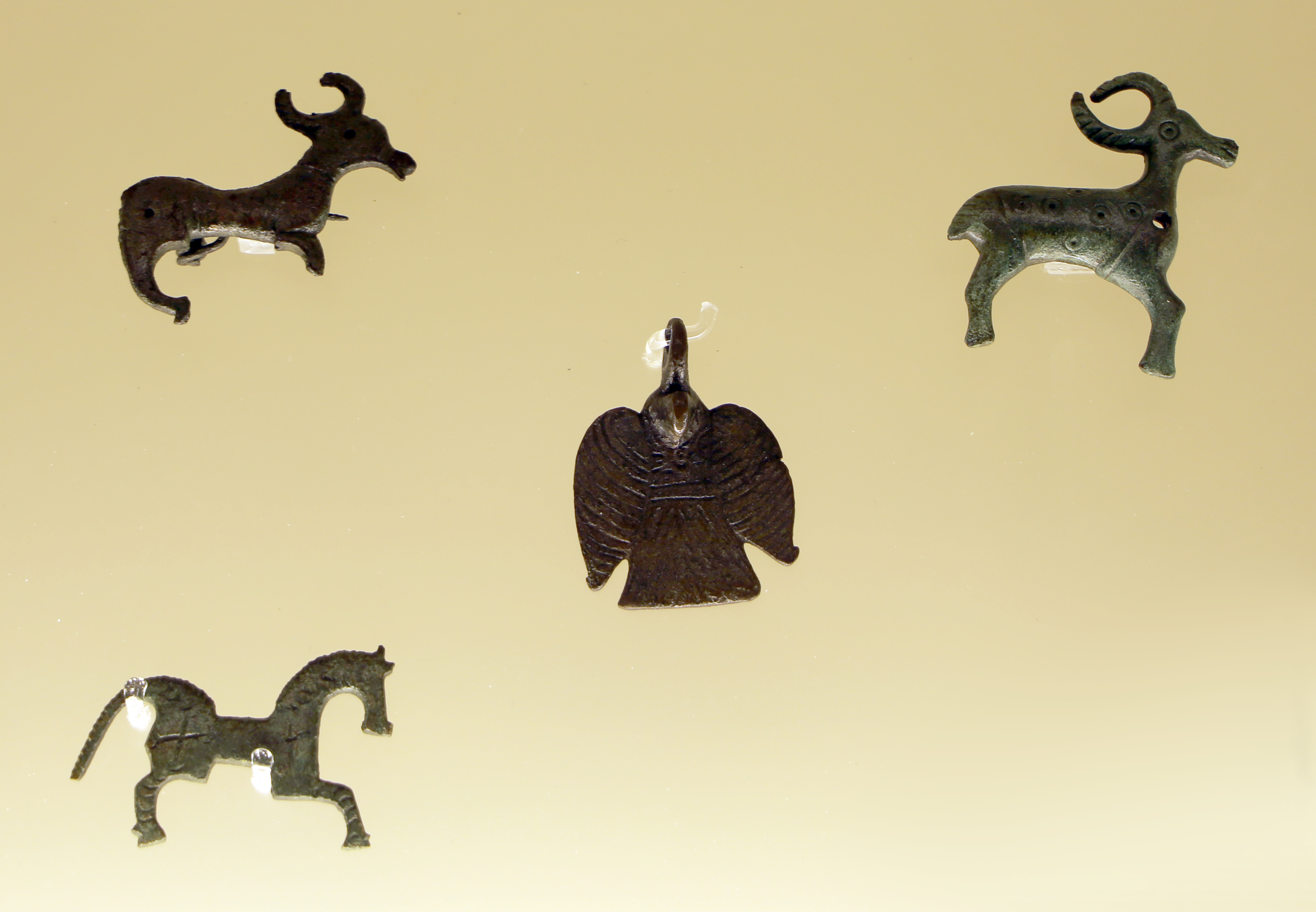
Early medieval jewellery, 5th-7th century, animal-shaped fibulae

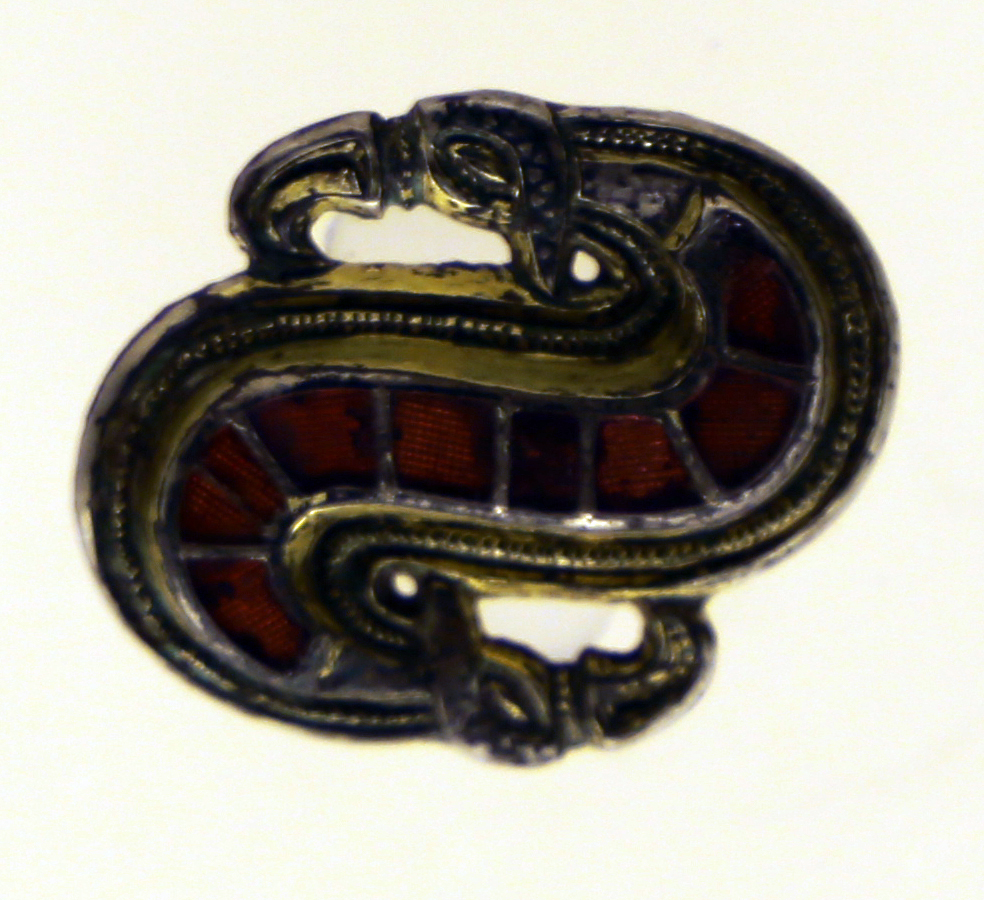
Early medieval jewellery, 5th-7th century, S 01 fibulae

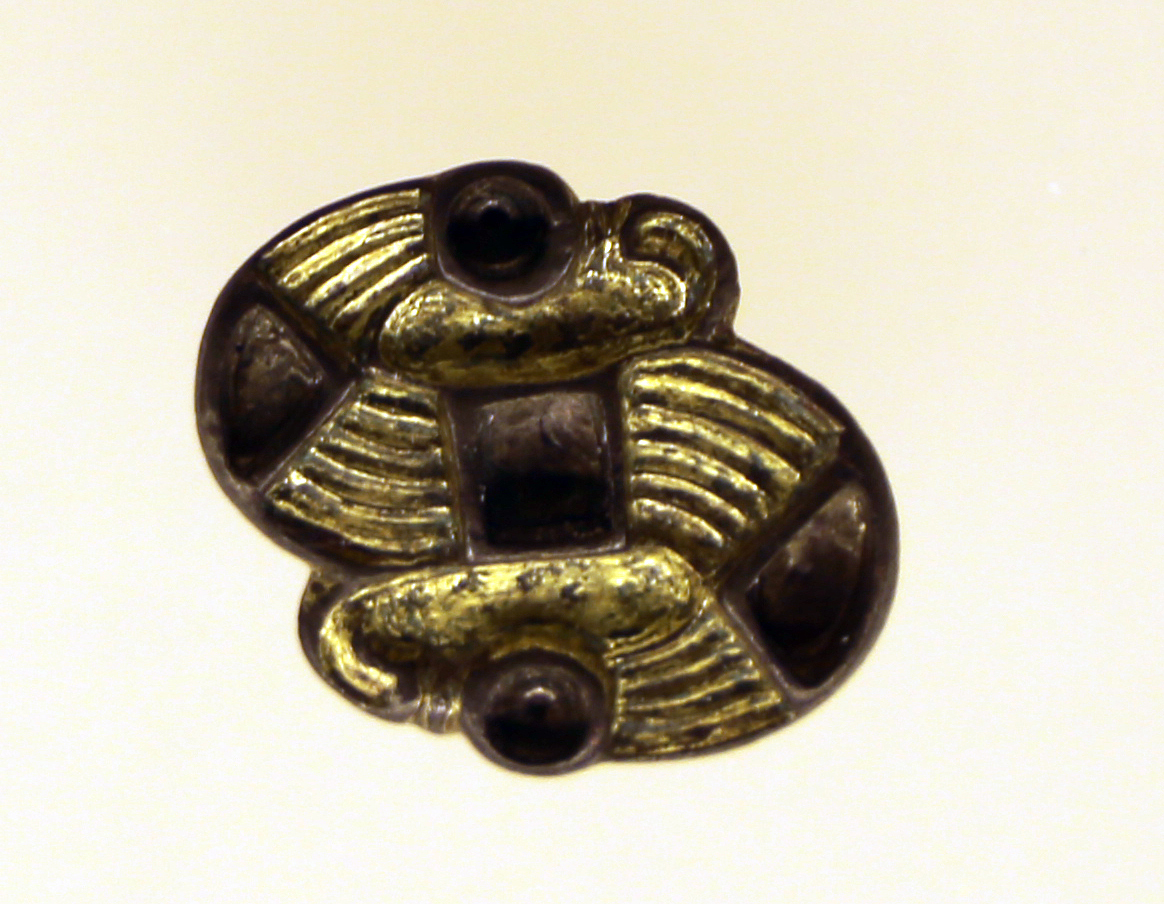
Early medieval jewellery, 5th-7th century, S 02 fibulae

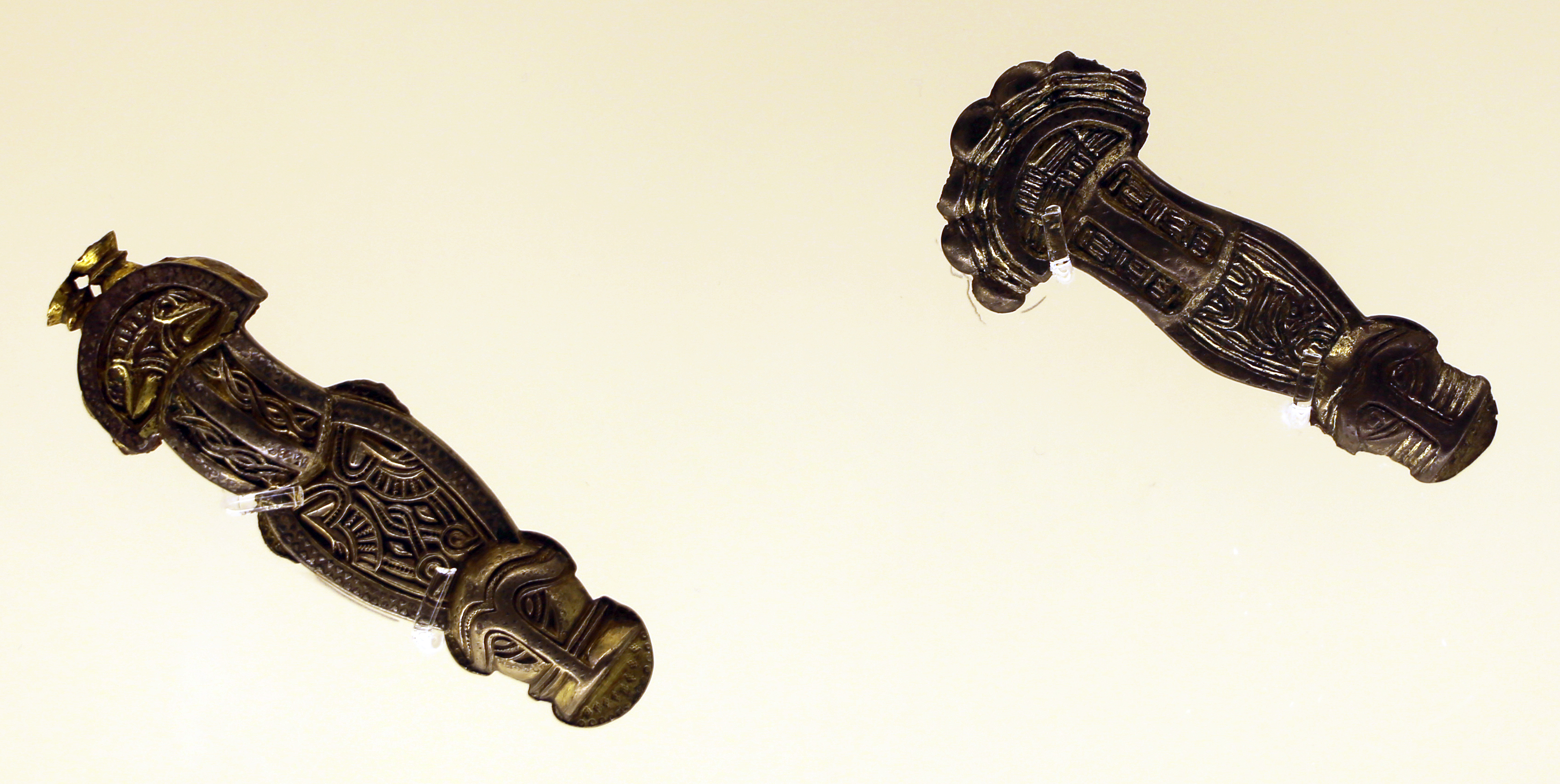
Early medieval jewellery, 5th-7th century, stirrup fibulae 01

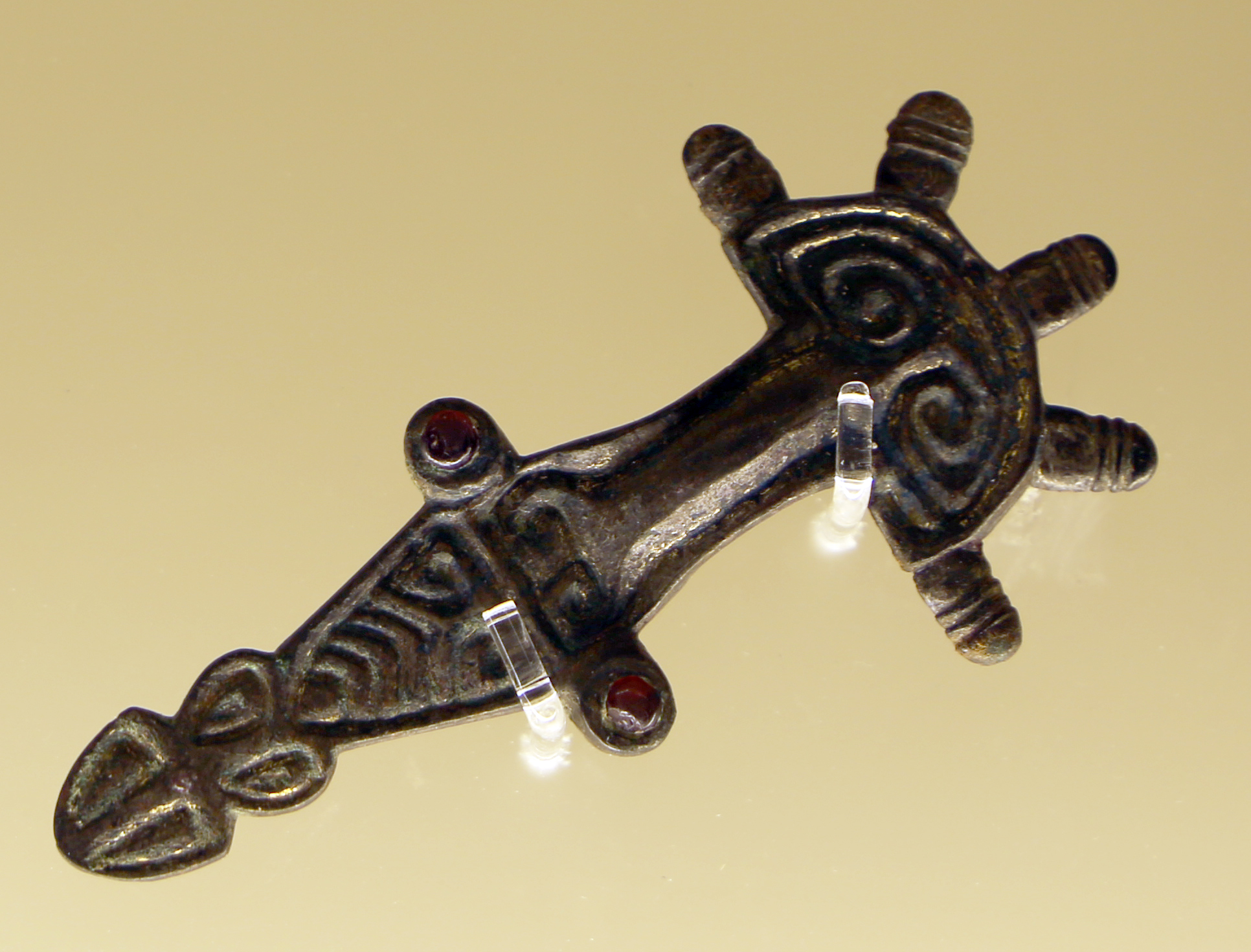
Early medieval jewellery, 5th-7th century, stirrup fibulae 02

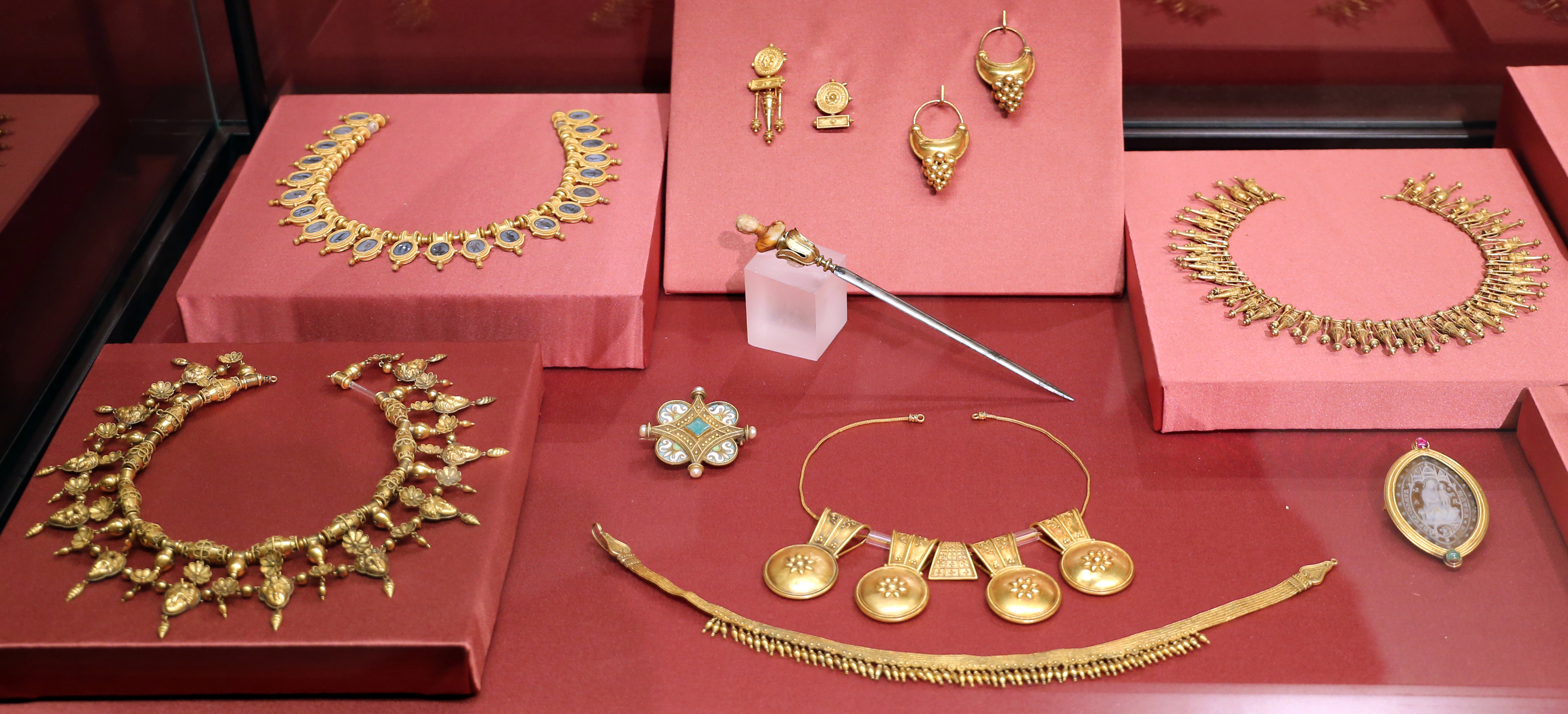
Castellani goldsmiths, 27 pieces of antique jewellery, 19th century (rome, villa giulia) 01,1

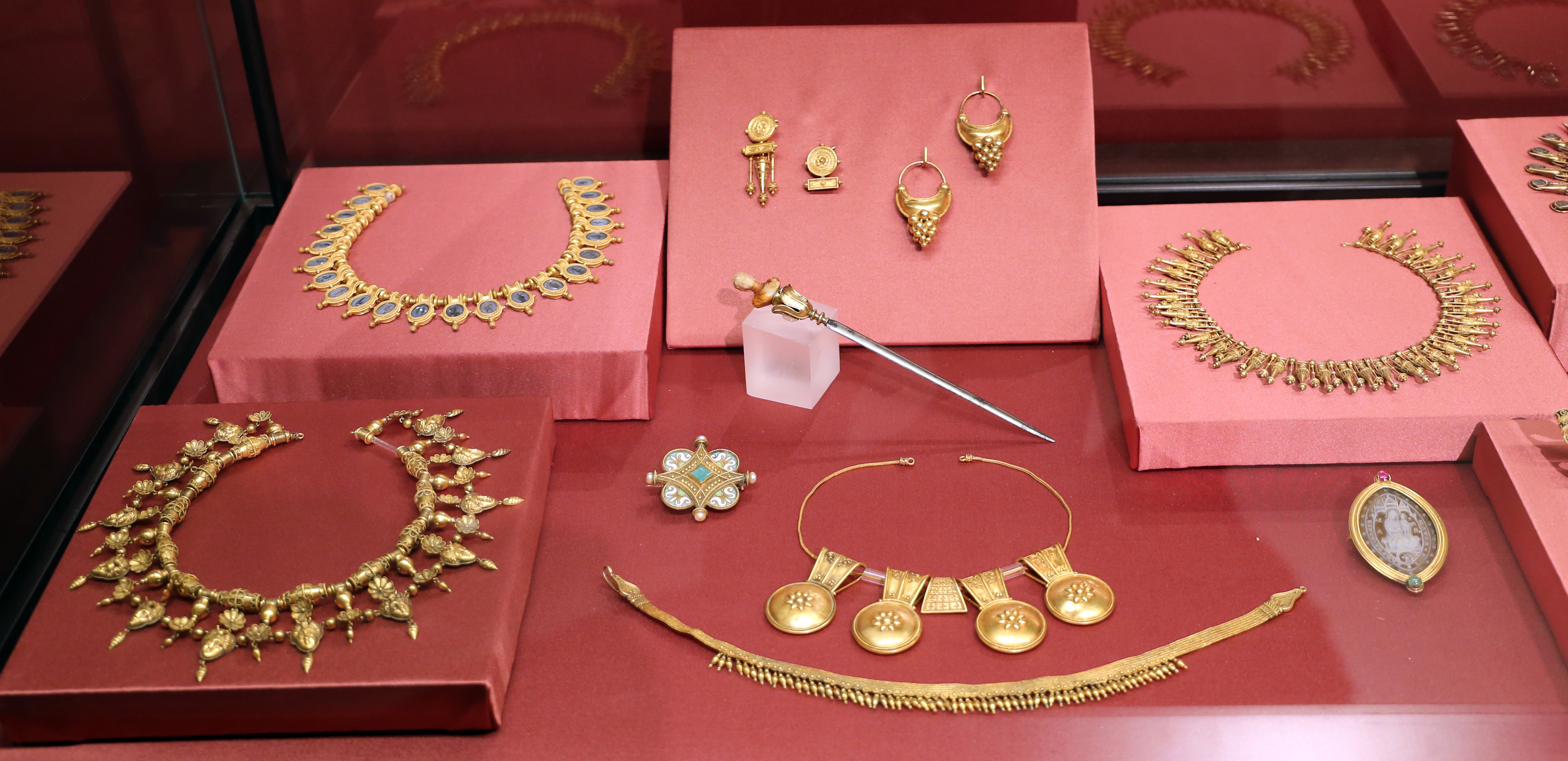
Castellani goldsmiths, 27 pieces of antique jewellery, 19th century (rome, villa giulia) 01

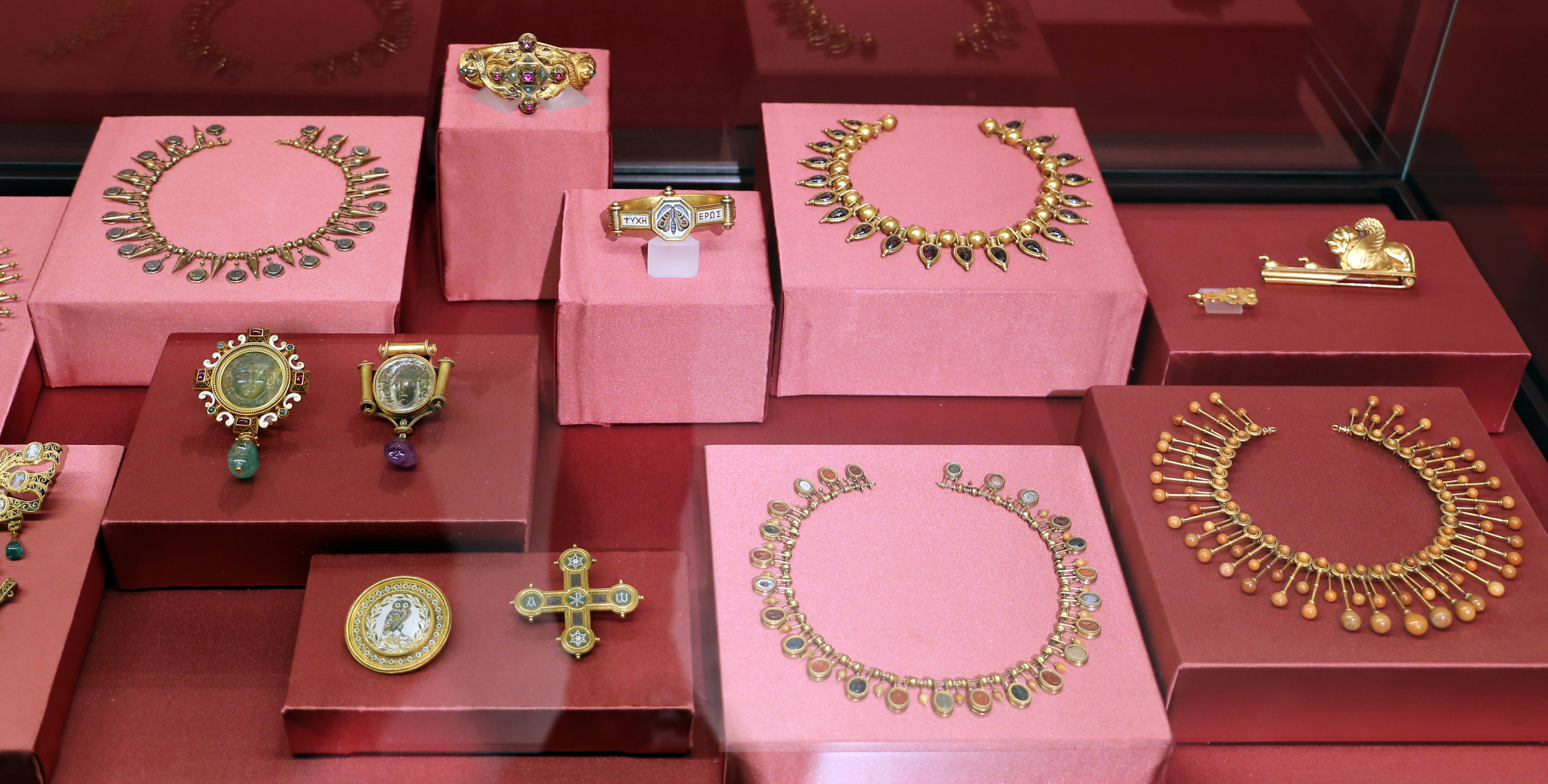
Castellani goldsmiths, 27 pieces of antique jewellery, 19th century (rome, villa giulia) 02,2

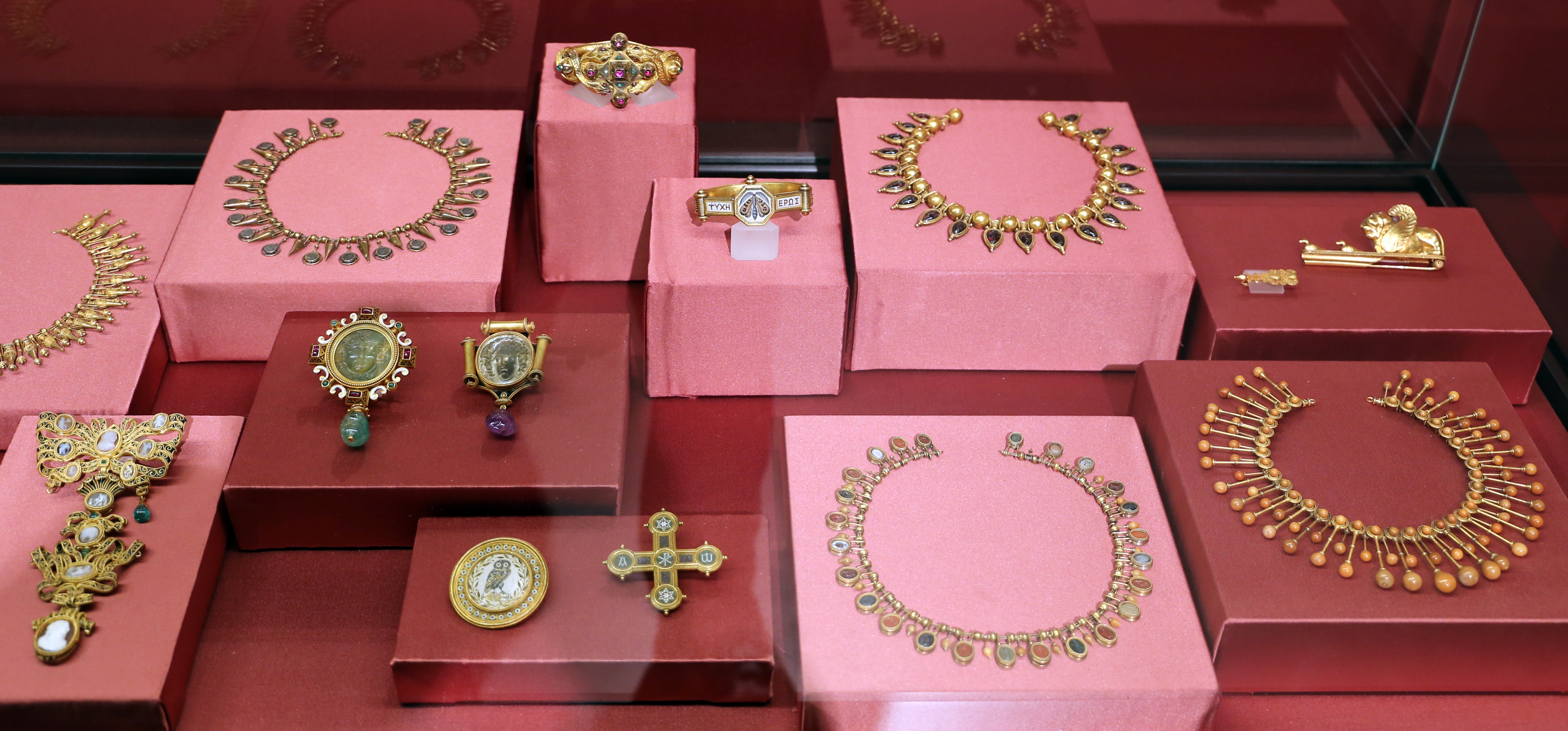
Castellani goldsmiths, 27 pieces of antique jewellery, 19th century (rome, villa giulia) 02

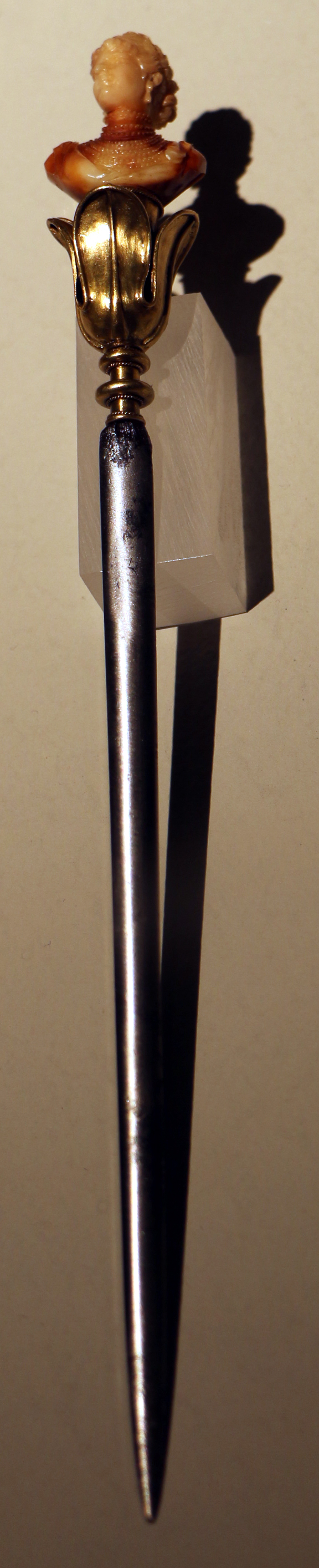
Castellani golds, made in imitation of the ancient in part by incorporating original materials, 19th century, crest needle 01

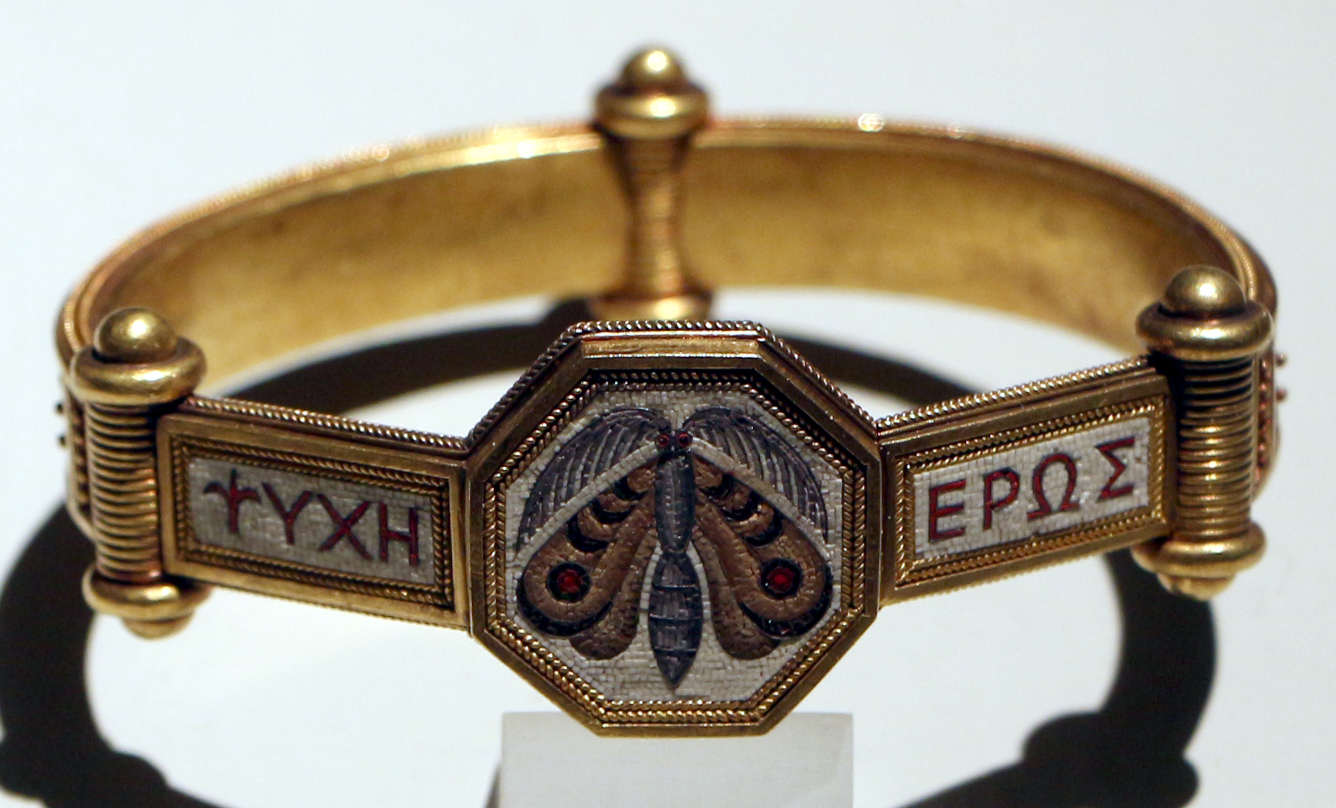
Castellani golds, made in imitation of the antique in part by incorporating original materials, 19th century, bracelets

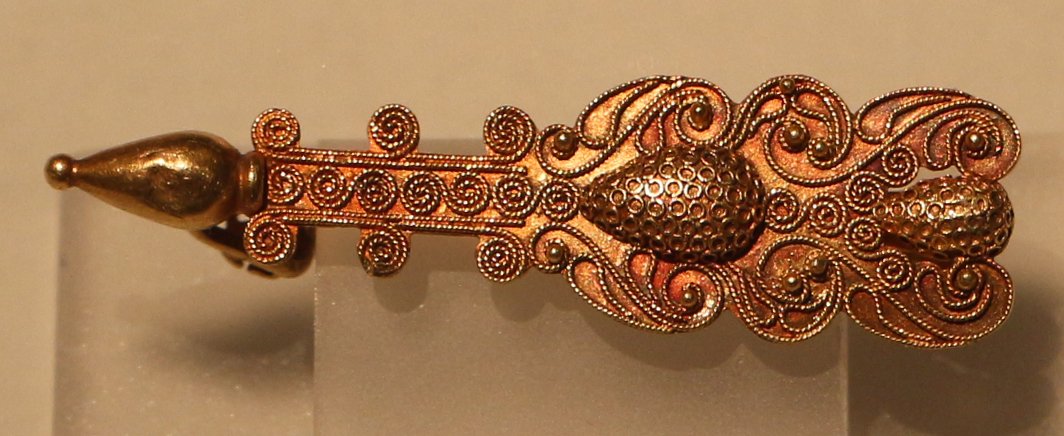
Castellani golds, made in imitation of the ancient in part by incorporating original materials, 19th century, fibula 01

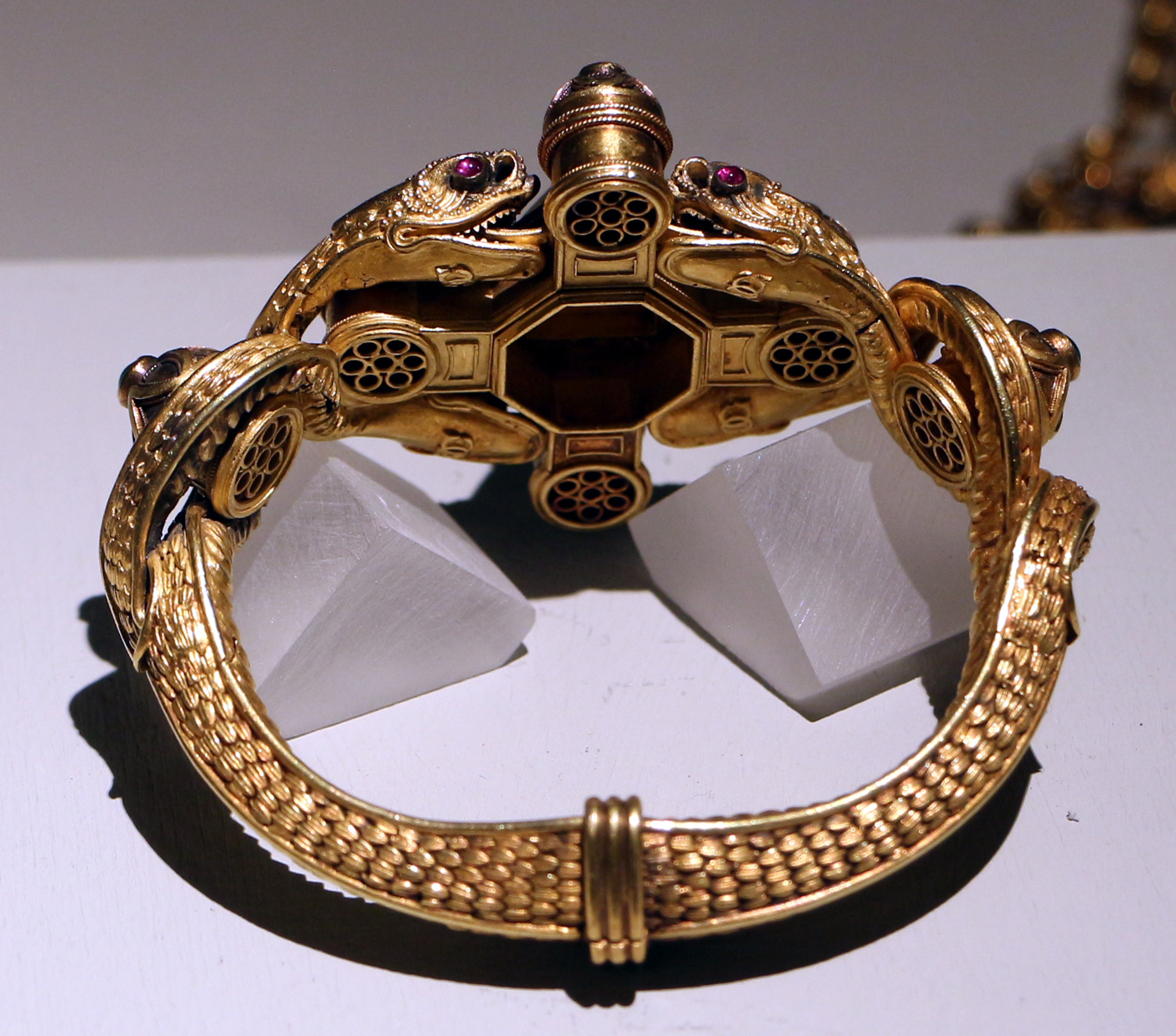
Castellani golds, made in imitation of the ancient in part by incorporating original materials, 19th century, bracelet 01

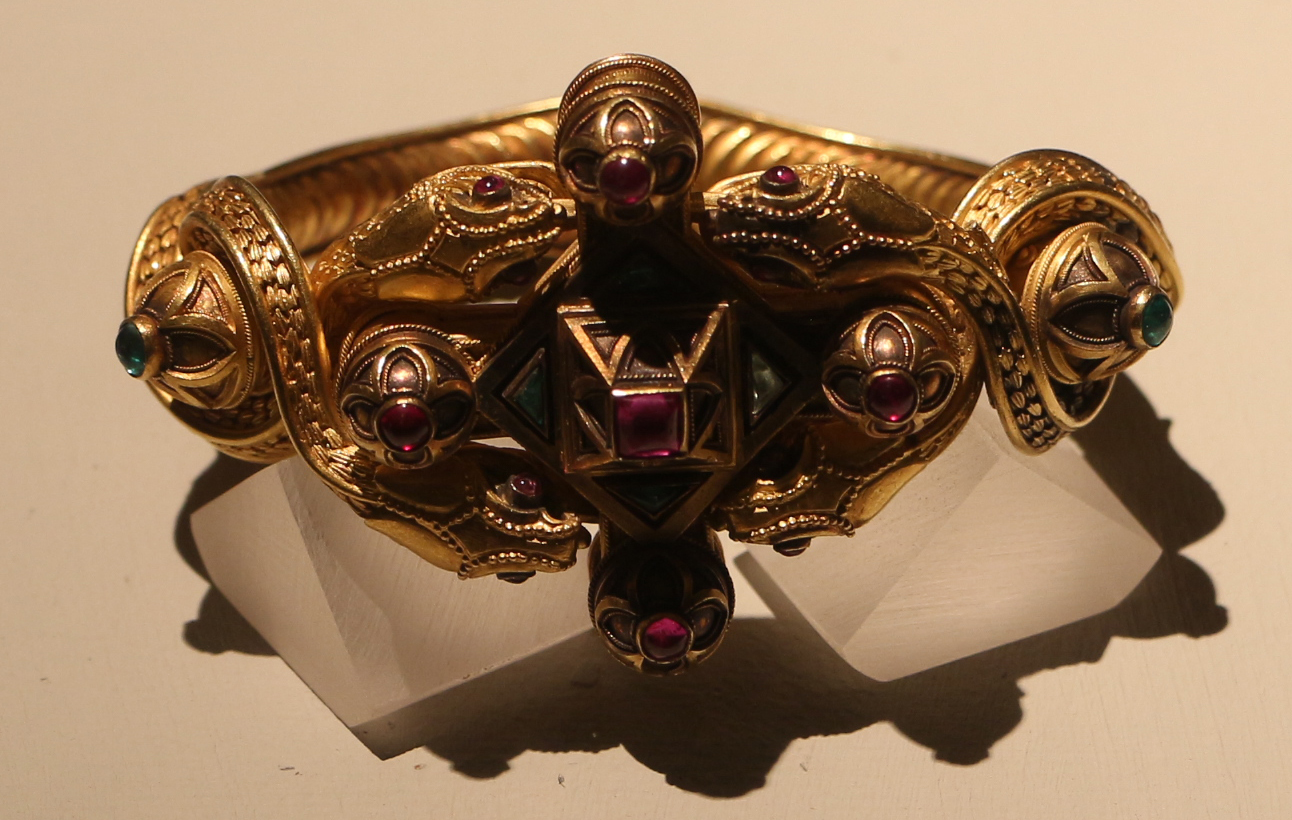
Castellani golds, made in imitation of the ancient in part by incorporating original materials, 19th century, bracelet 02

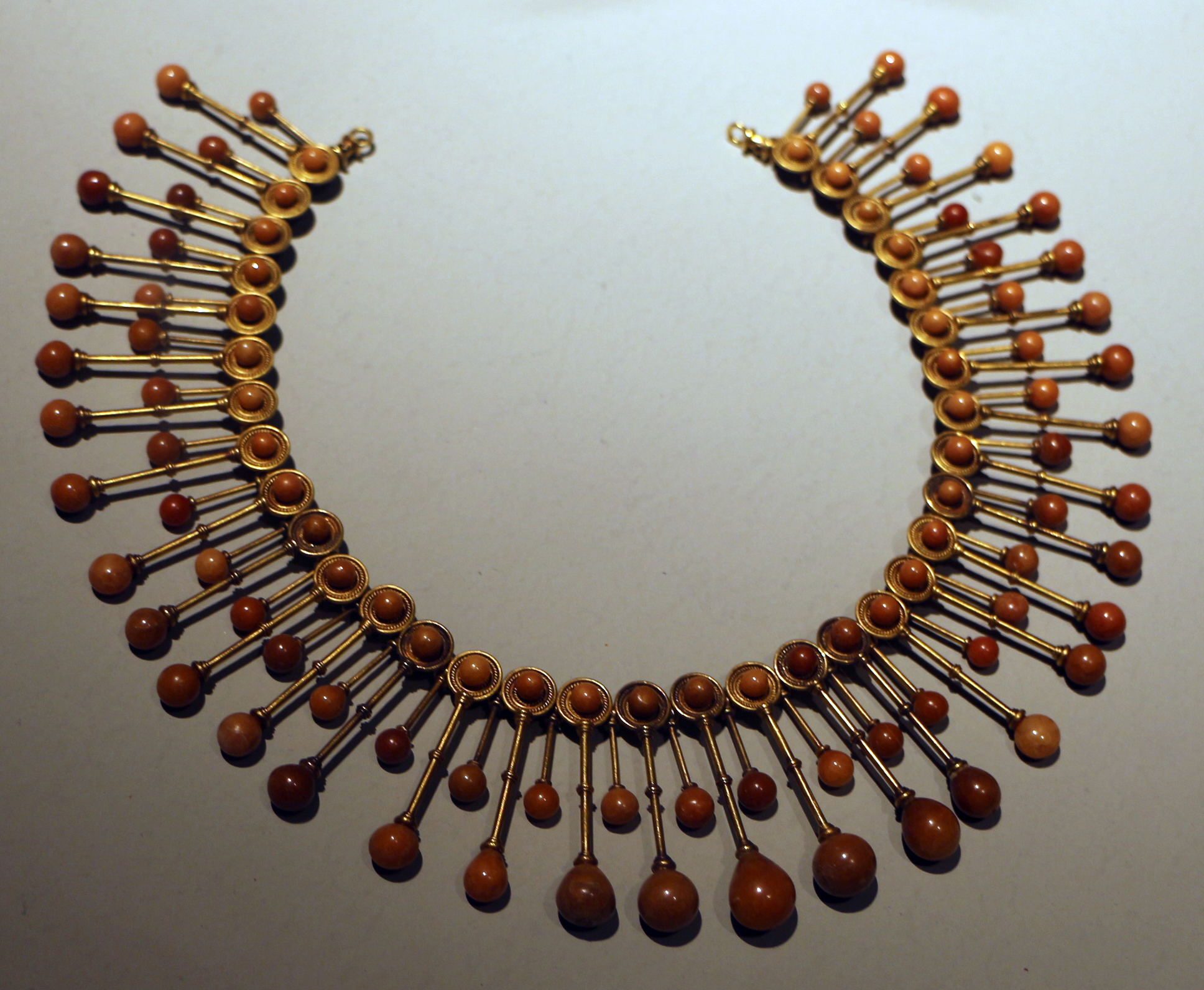
Castellani golds, made in imitation of the ancient in part by incorporating original materials, 19th century, necklace 01

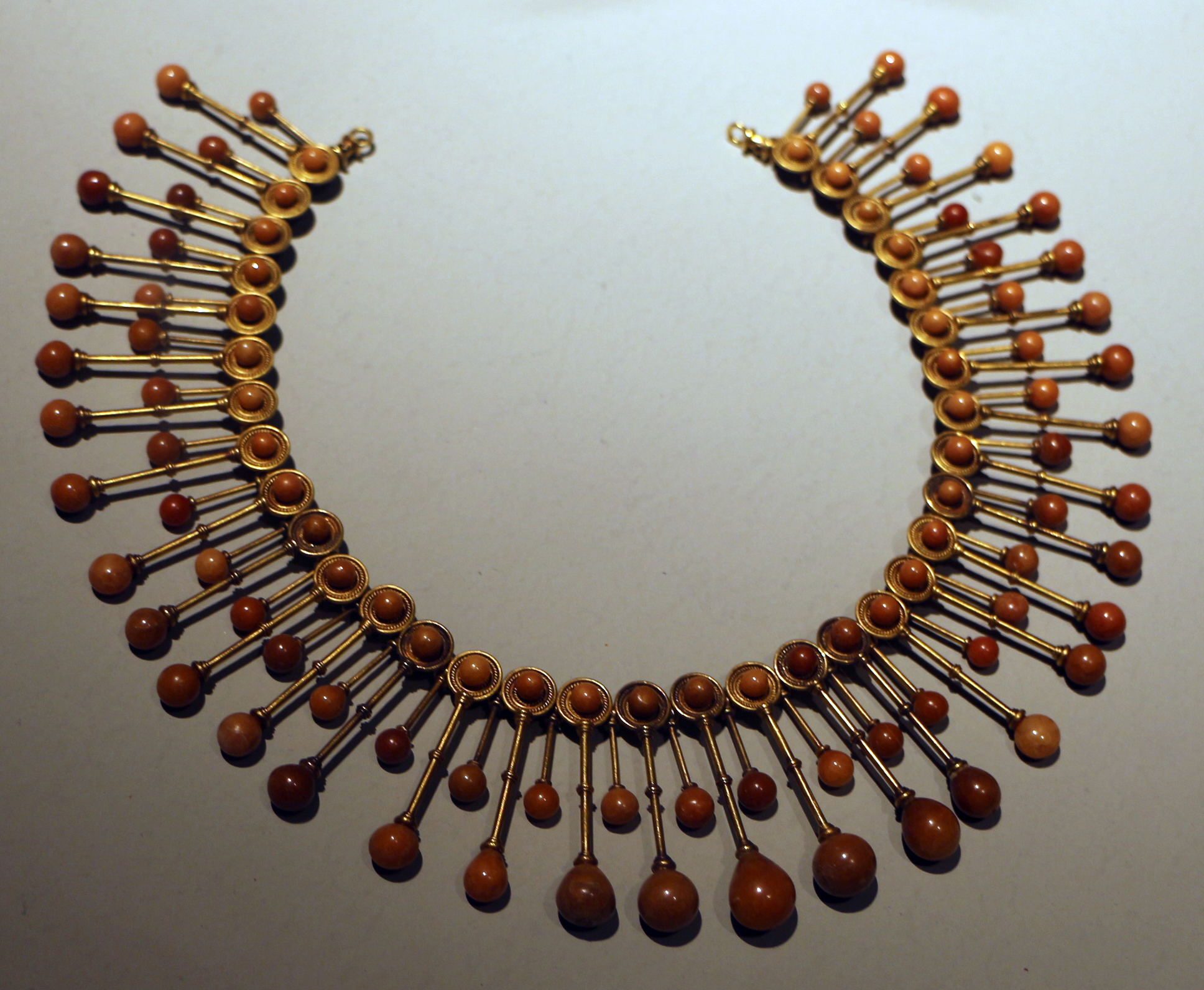
Castellani golds, made in imitation of the ancient in part by incorporating original materials, 19th century, necklace 02

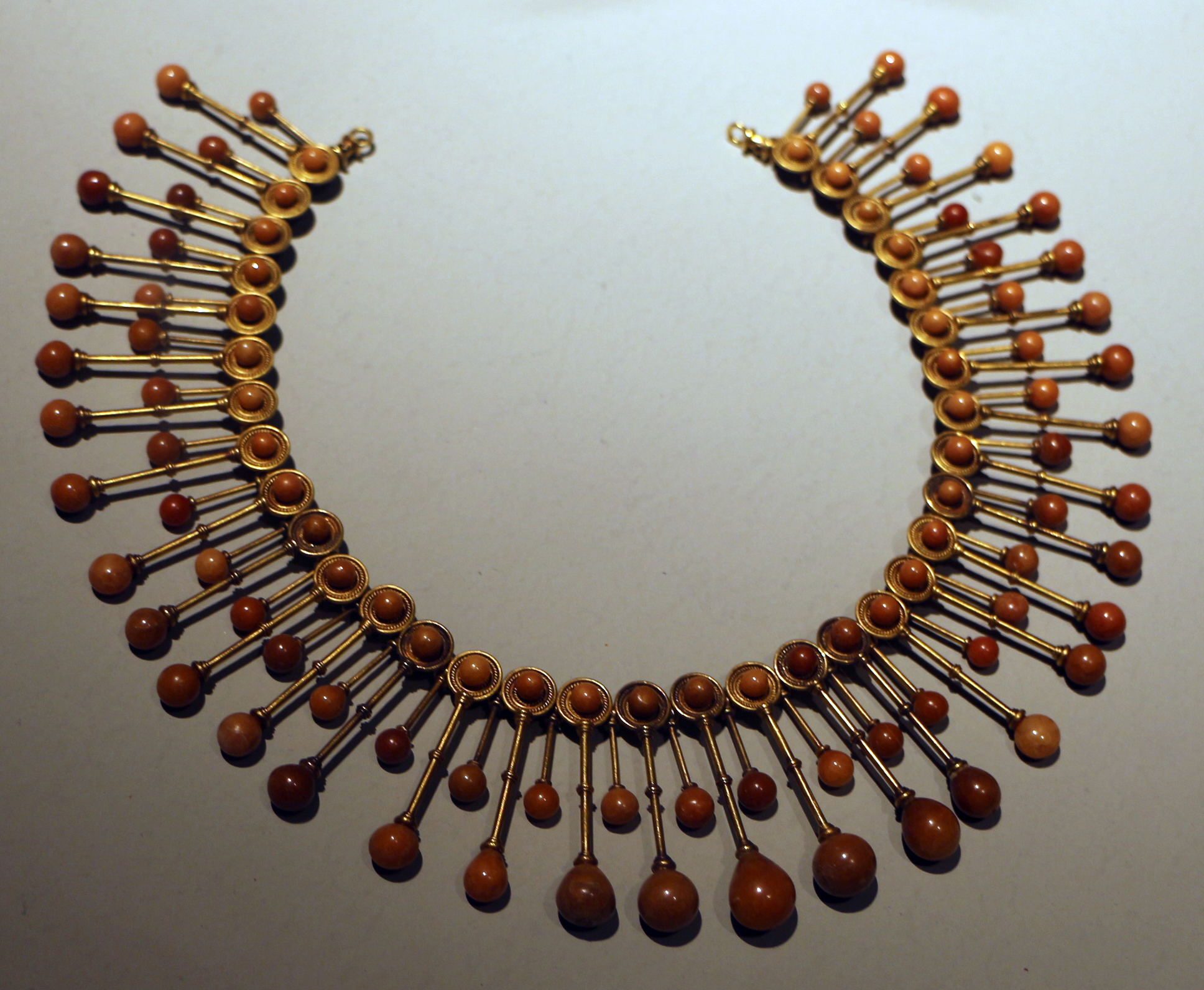
Castellani golds, made in imitation of the ancient in part by incorporating original materials, 19th century, necklace 03

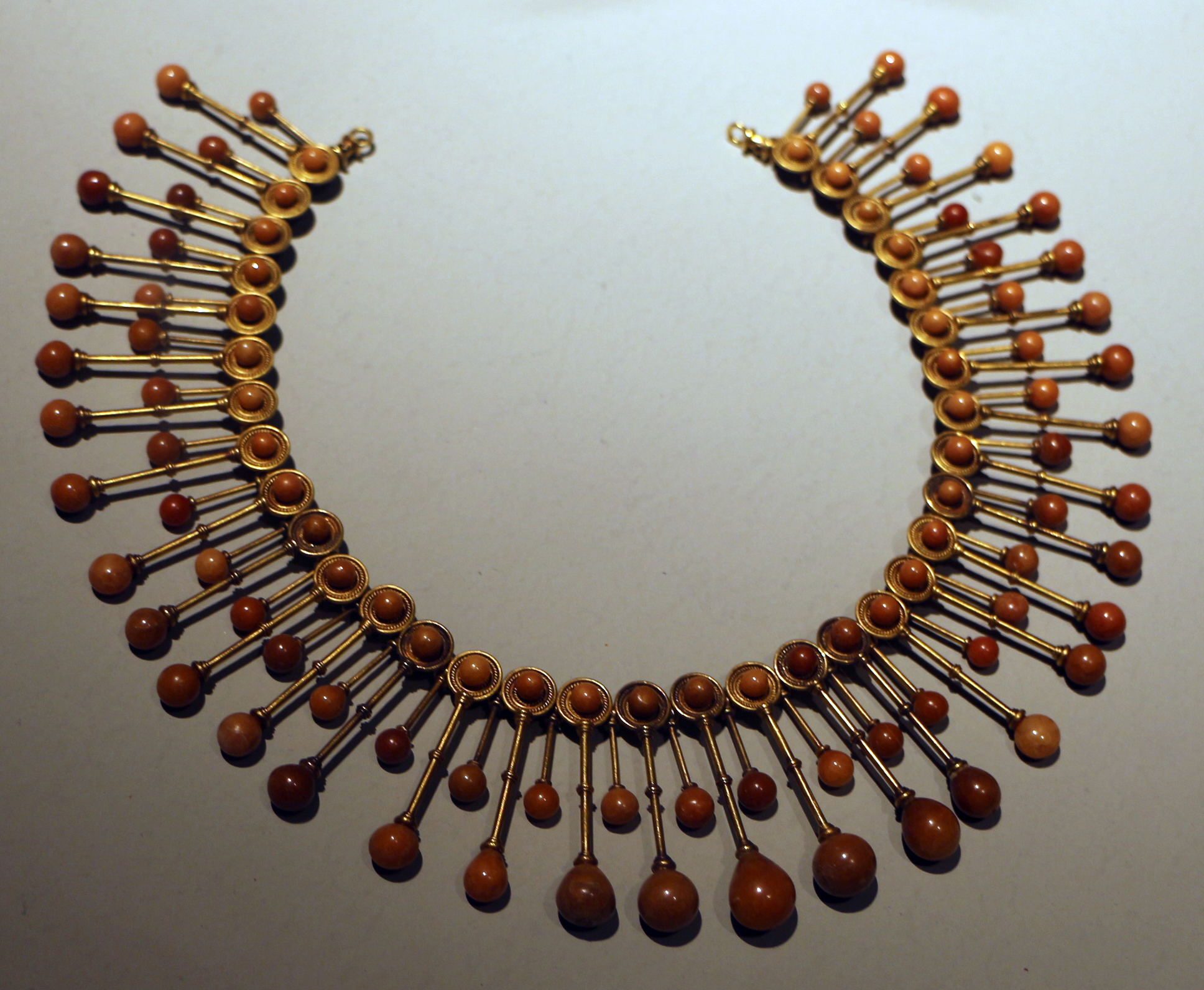
Castellani golds, made in imitation of the ancient in part by incorporating original materials, 19th century, necklace 04

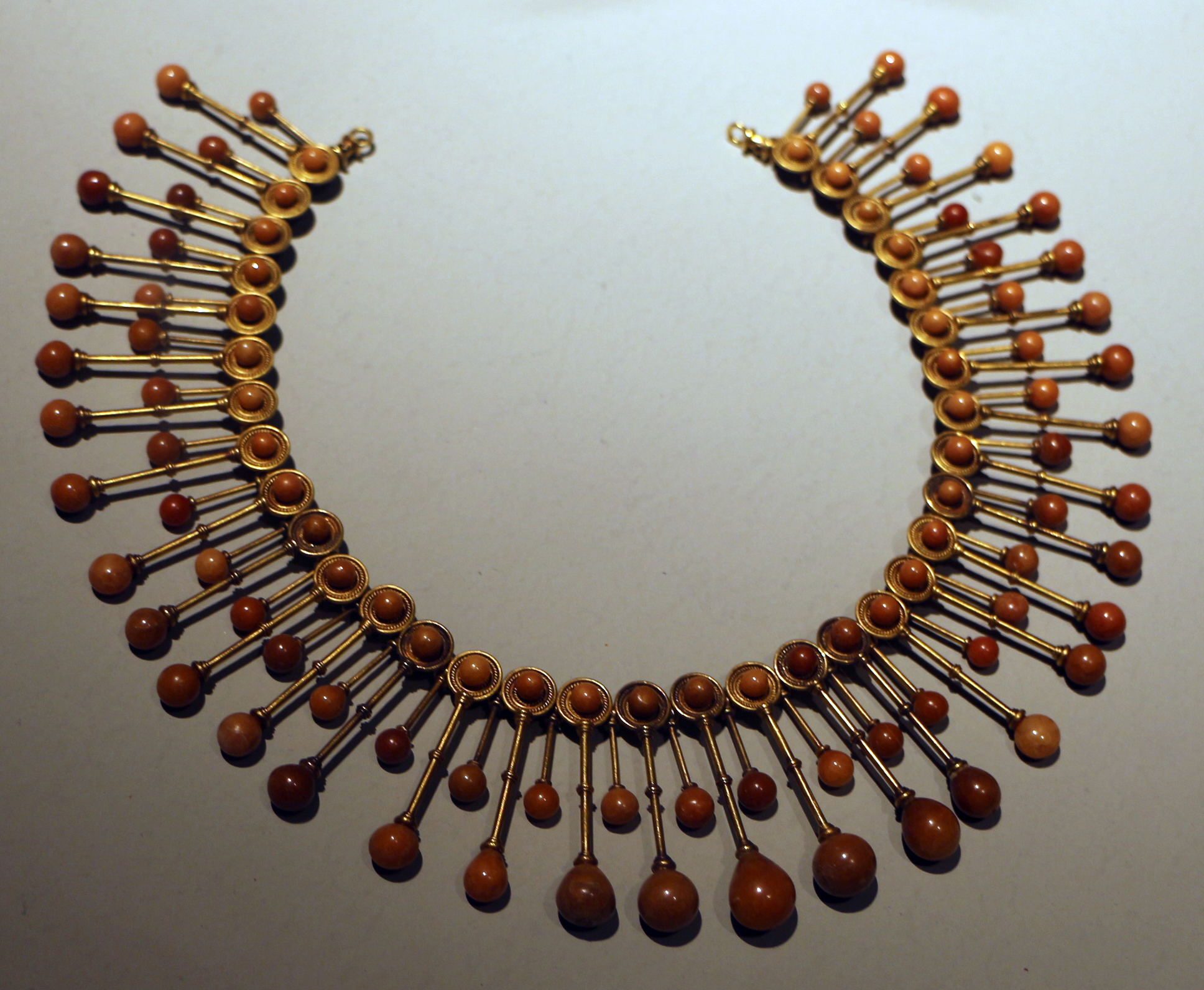
Castellani golds, made in imitation of the ancient in part by incorporating original materials, 19th century, necklace 05

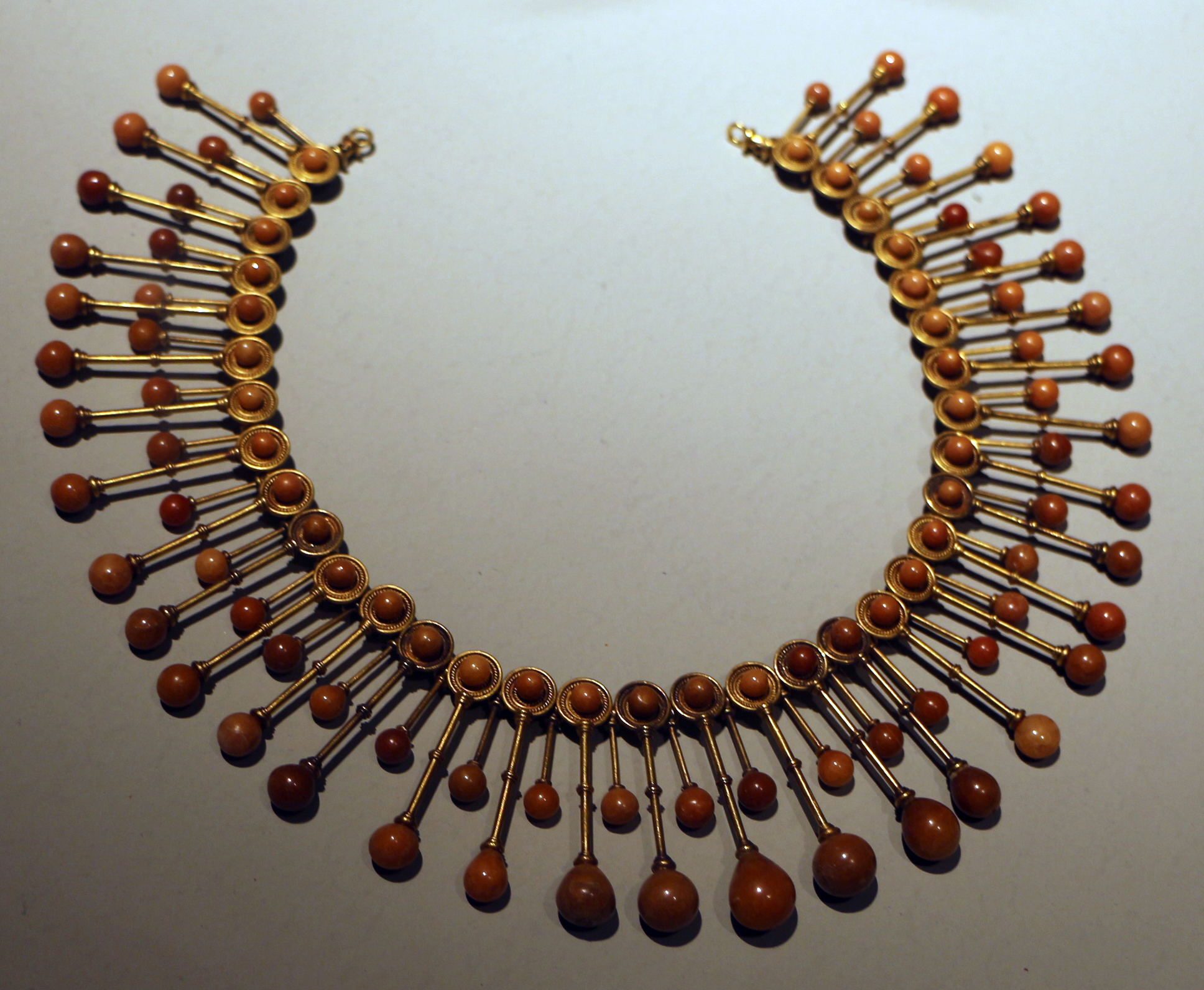
Castellani golds, made in imitation of the ancient in part by incorporating original materials, 19th century, necklace 06

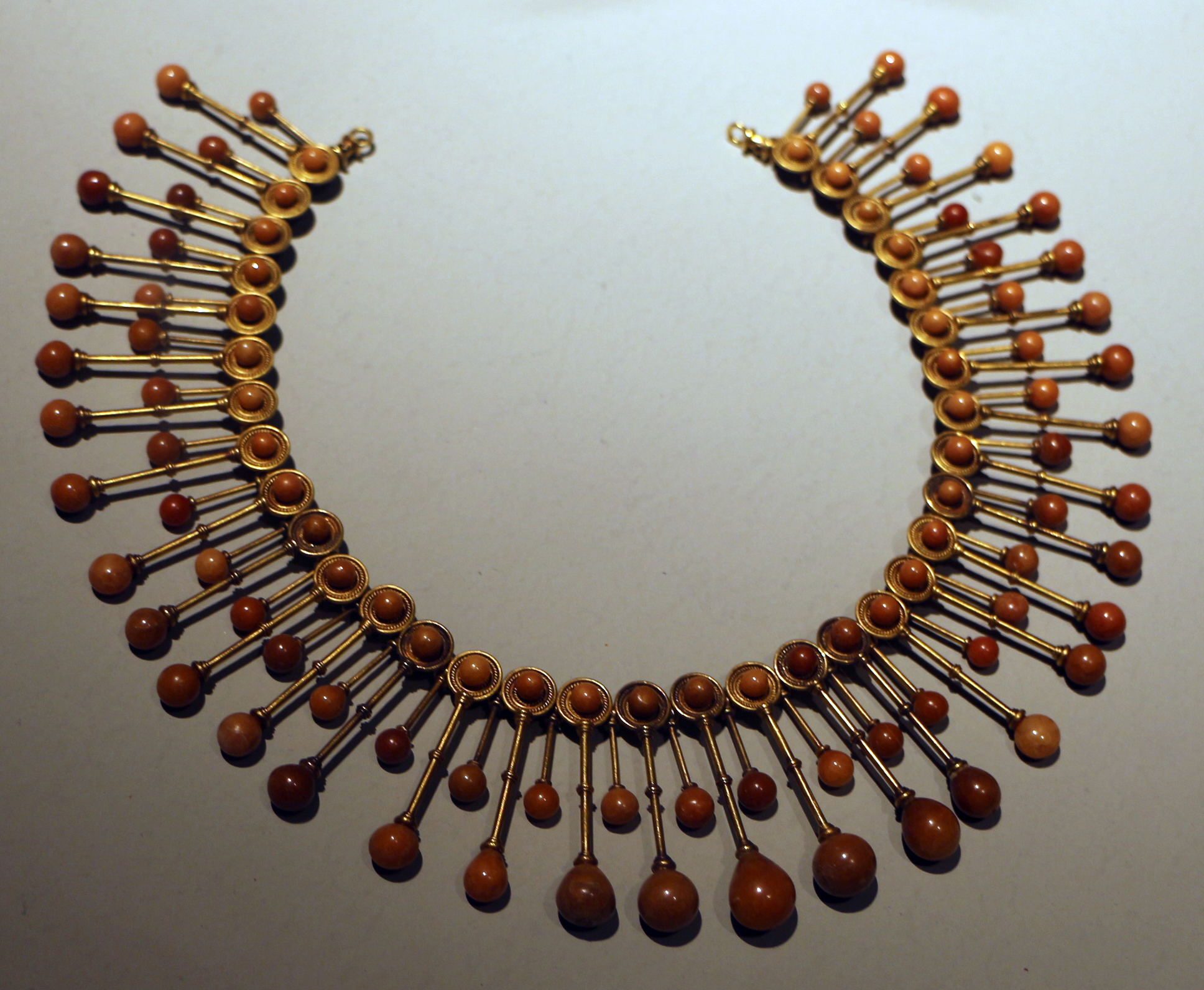
Castellani golds, made in imitation of the ancient in part by incorporating original materials, 19th century, necklace 07

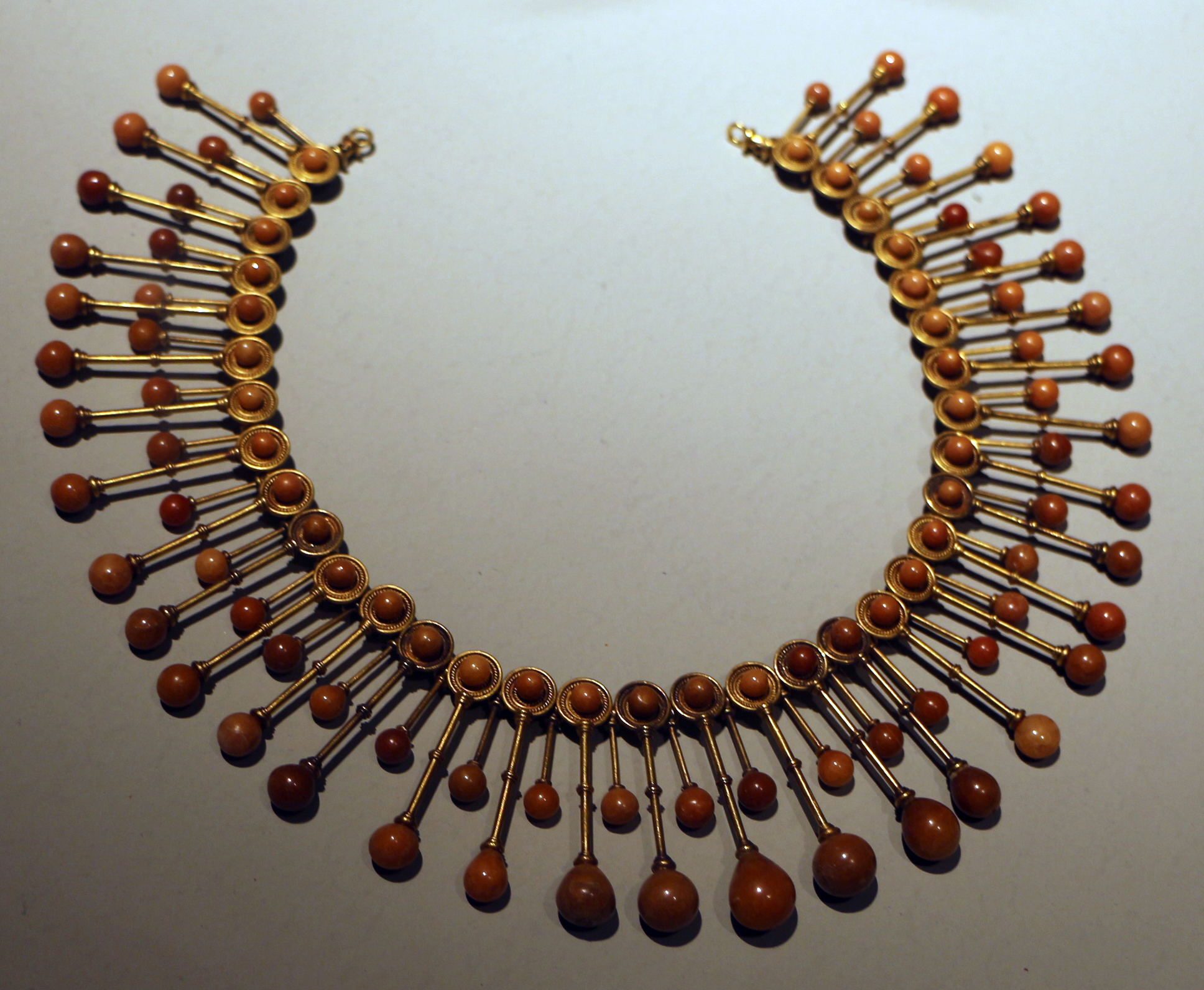
Castellani golds, made in imitation of the ancient in part by incorporating original materials, 19th century, necklace 08

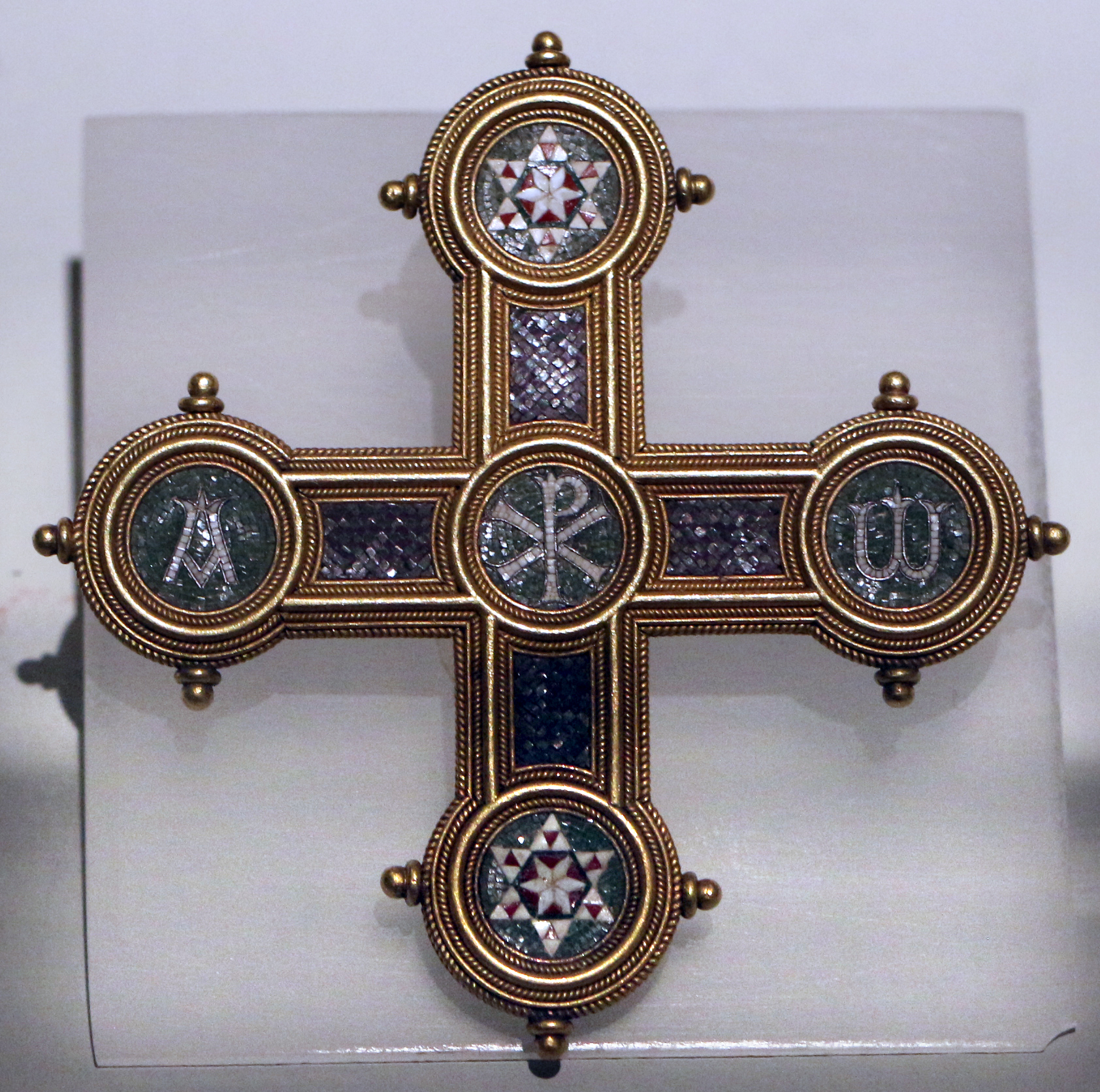
Castellani golds, made in imitation of the ancient in part by incorporating original materials, 19th century, pectoral cross

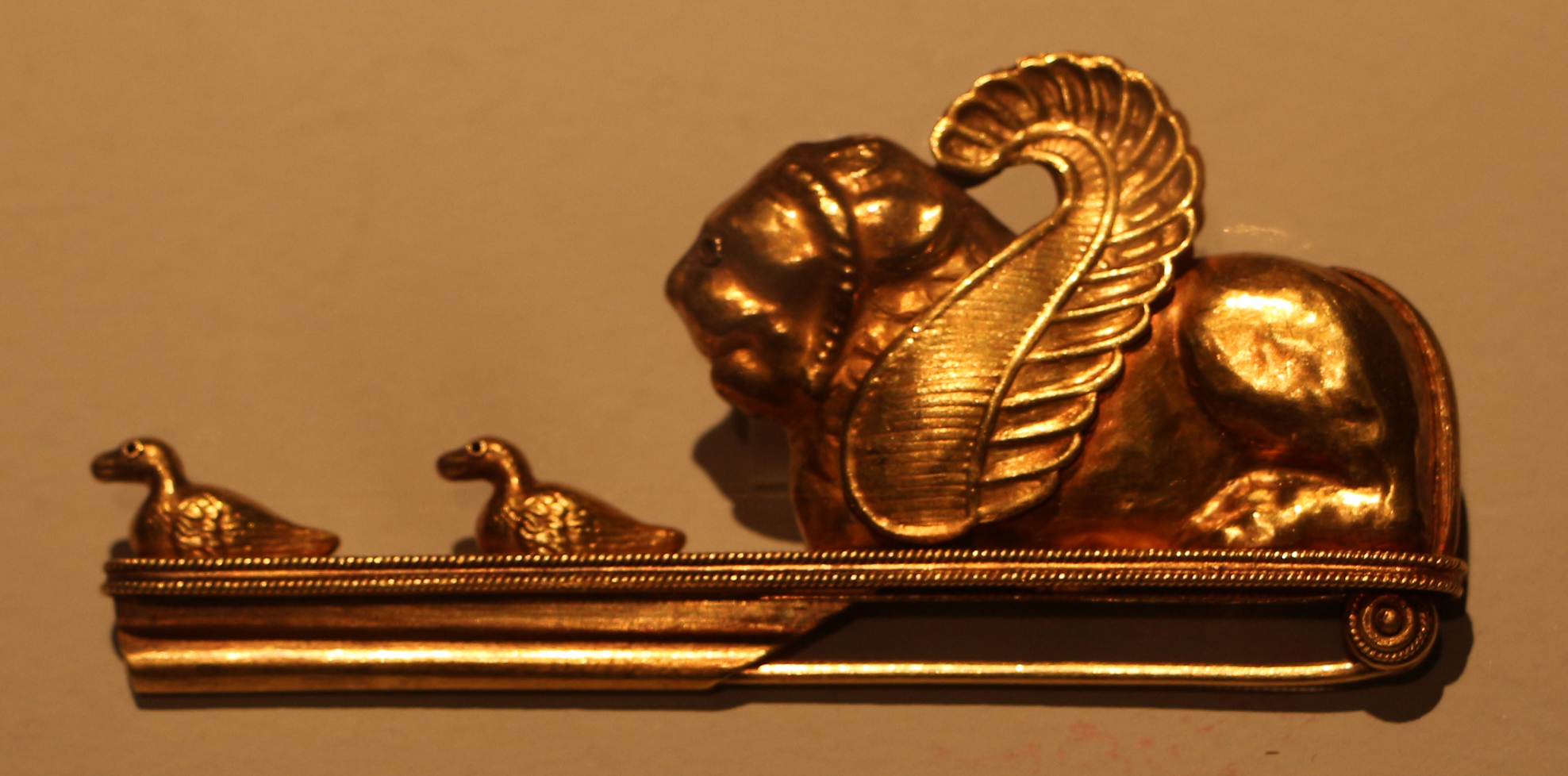
Castellani golds, made in imitation of the antique partly by incorporating original materials, 19th century, fibula with winged lion and ducks

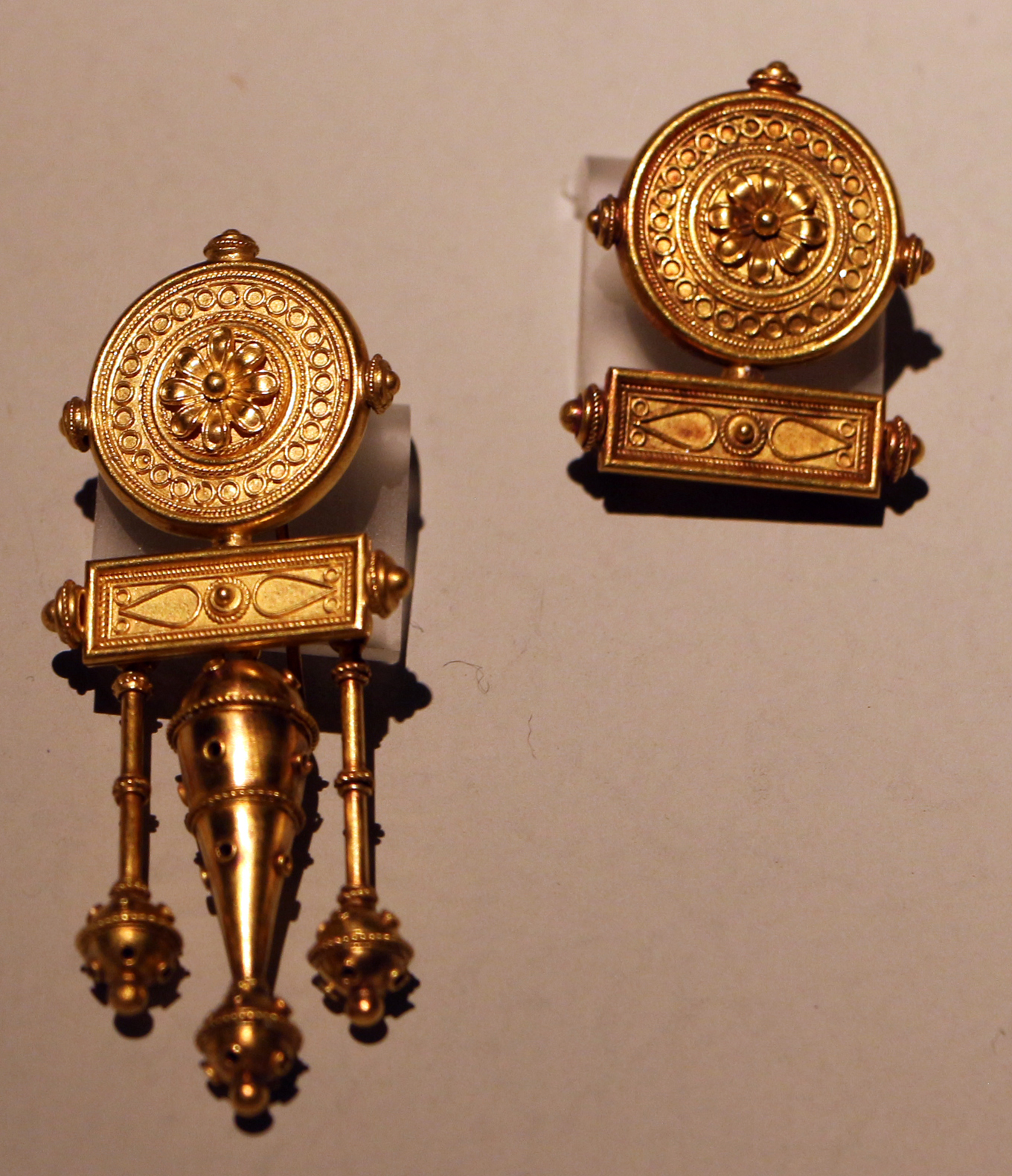
Castellani golds, made in imitation of the antique in part by incorporating original materials, 19th century, earrings 01

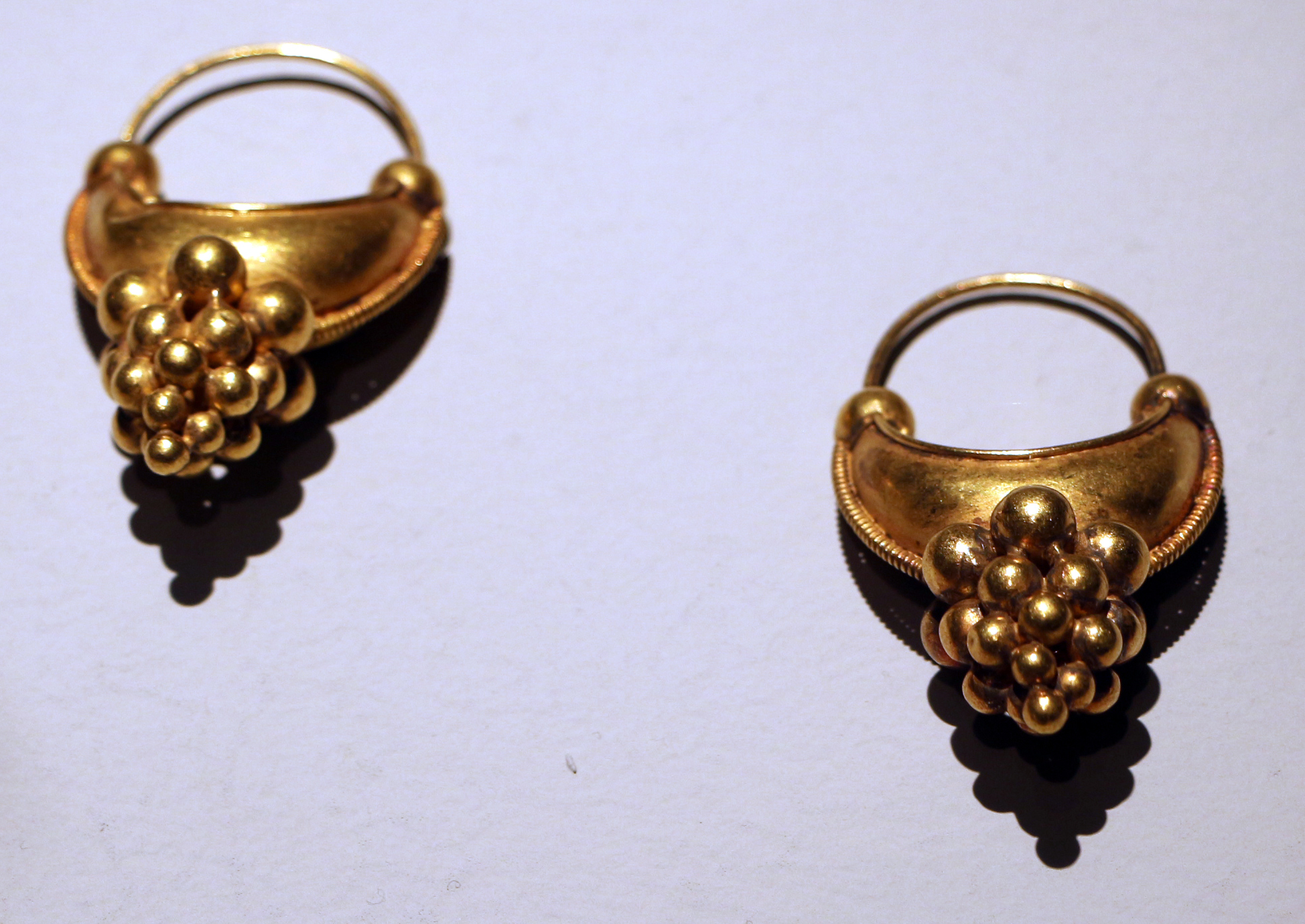
Castellani golds, made in imitation of the ancient in part by incorporating original materials, 19th century, ship earrings with bunches

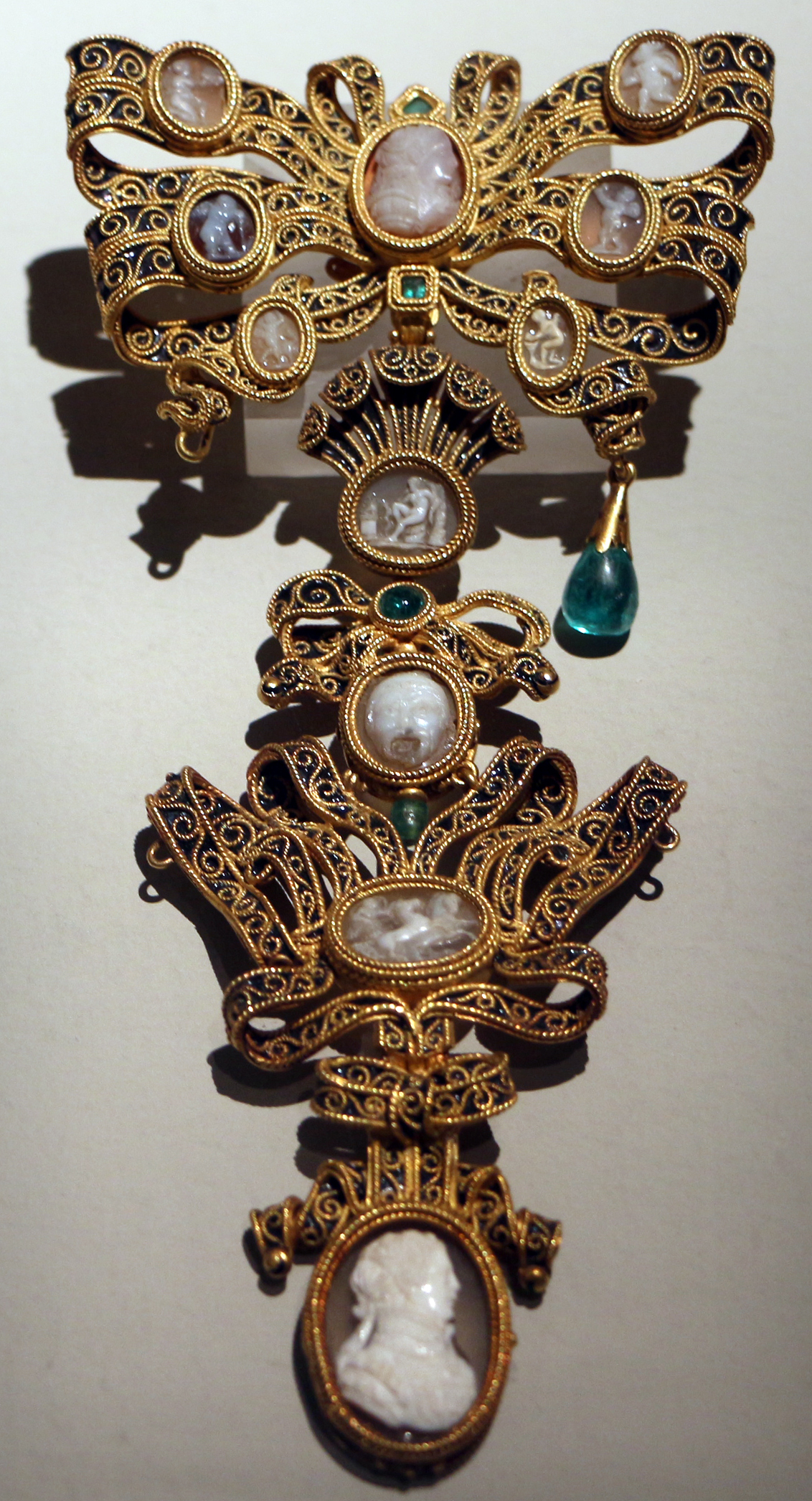
Castellani golds, made in imitation of the ancient in part by incorporating original materials, 19th century, brooch 01

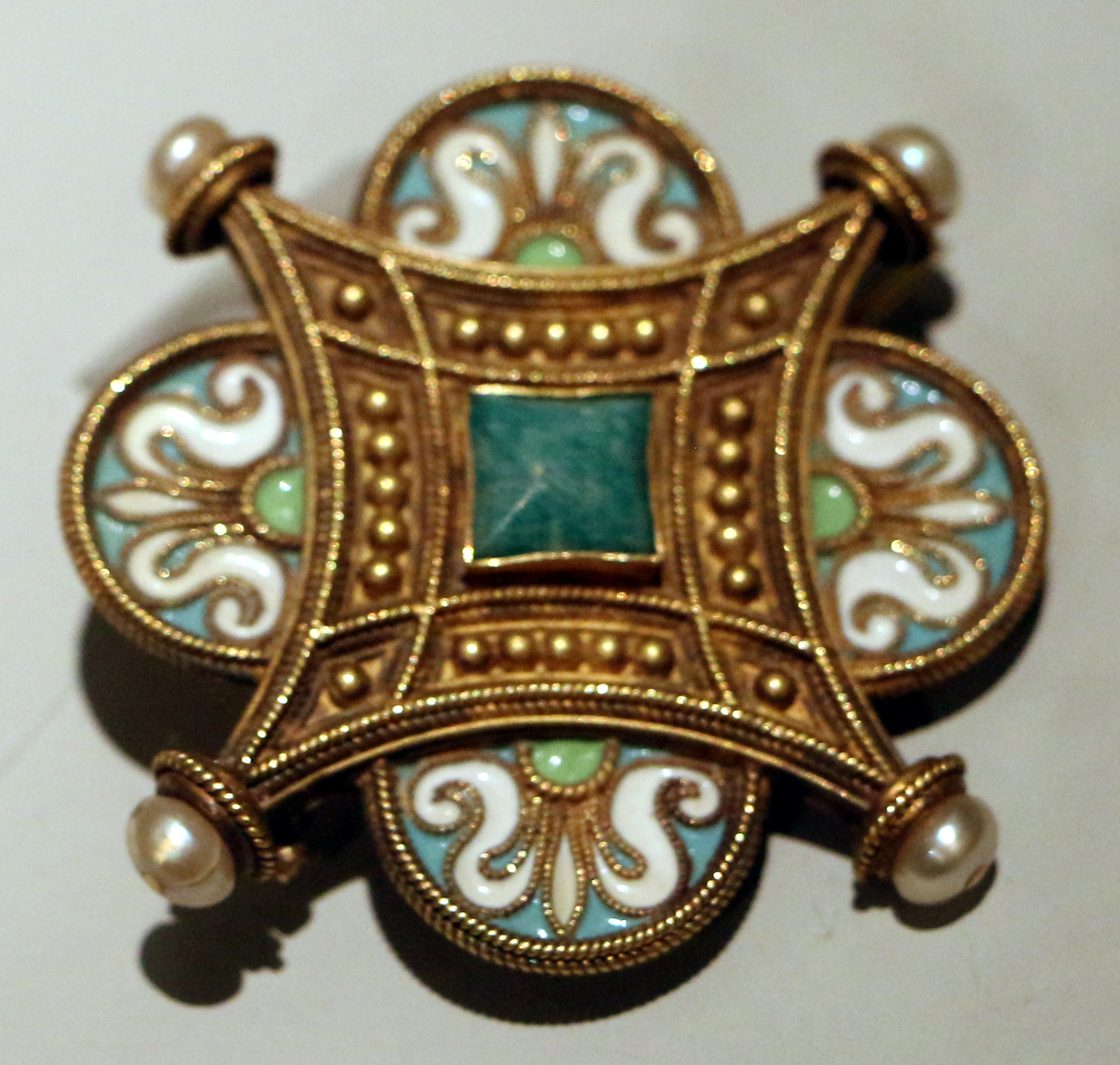
Castellani golds, made in imitation of the ancient in part by incorporating original materials, 19th century, brooch 02

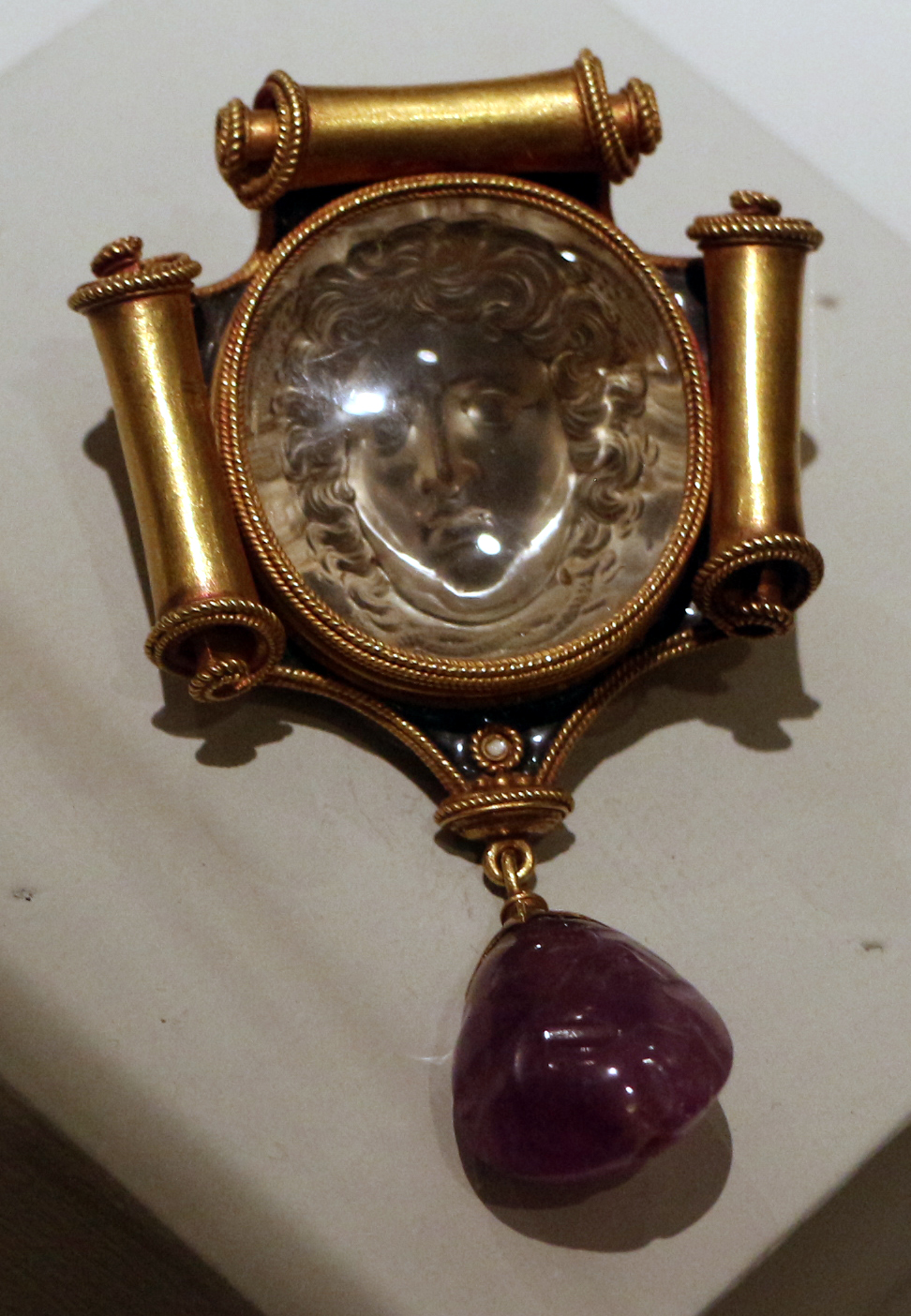
Castellani golds, made in imitation of the ancient in part by incorporating original materials, 19th century, brooch 03

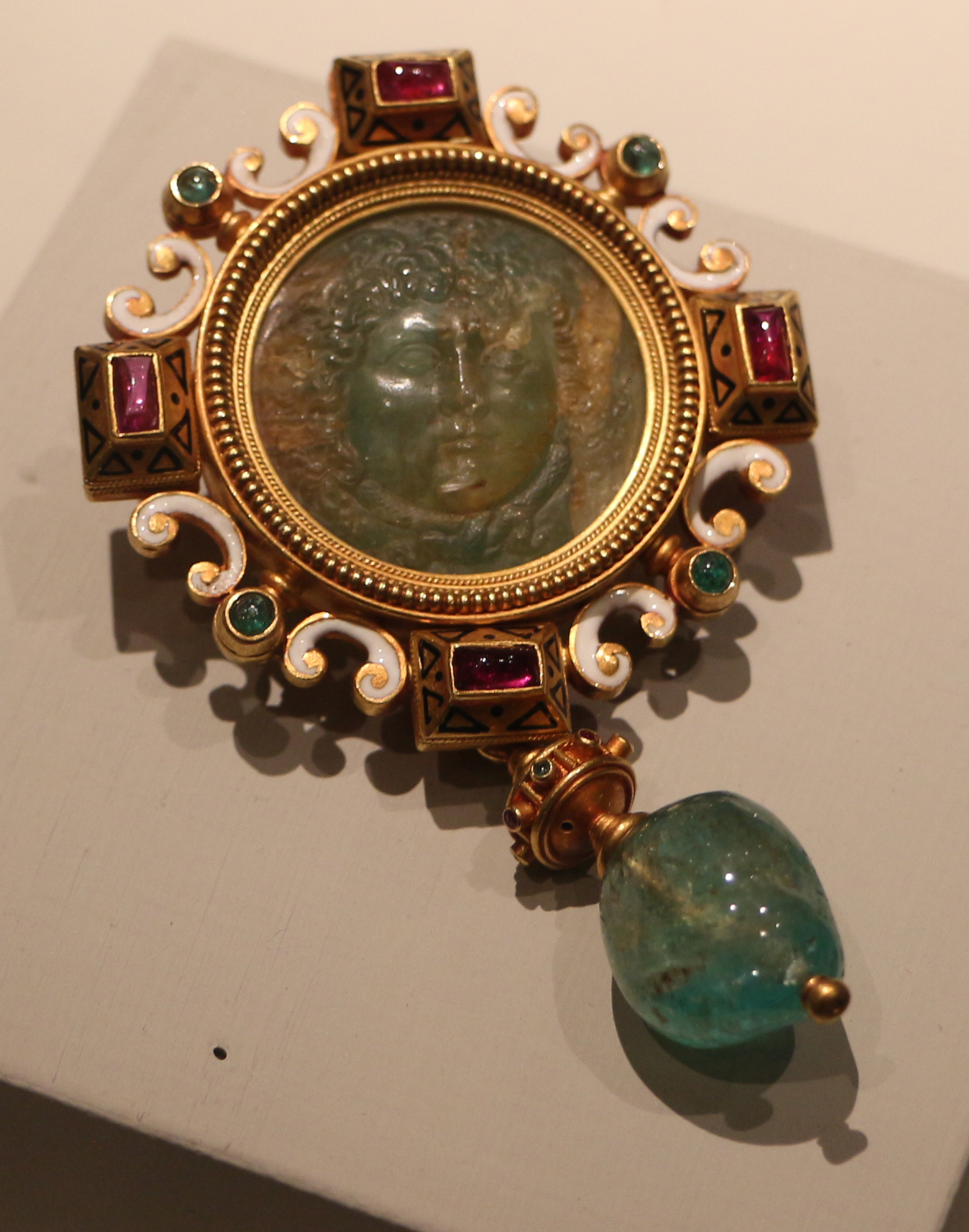
Castellani golds, made in imitation of the ancient in part by incorporating original materials, 19th century, brooch 04

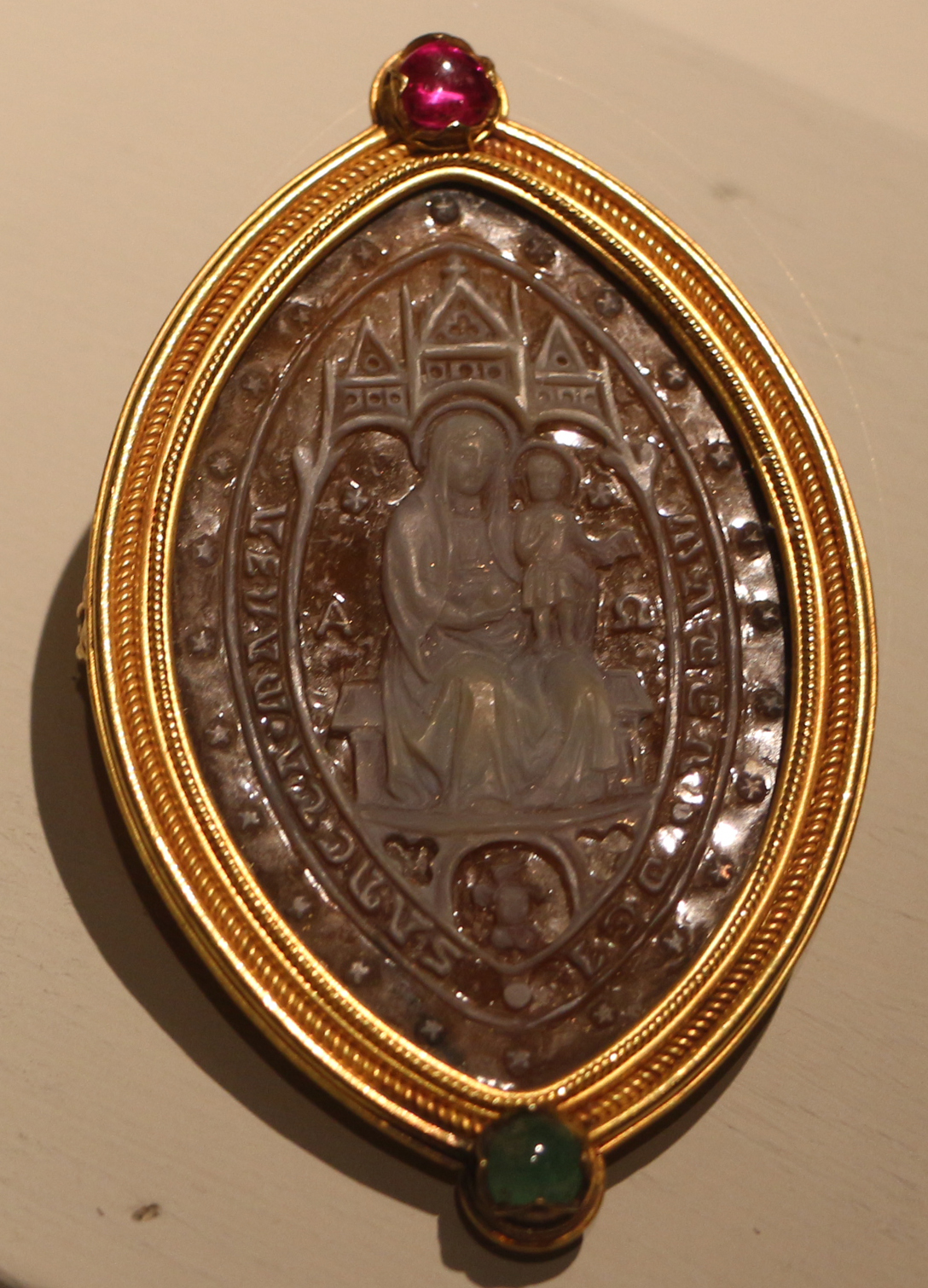
Castellani golds, made in imitation of the ancient in part by incorporating original materials, 19th century, brooch with a Gothic style cameo

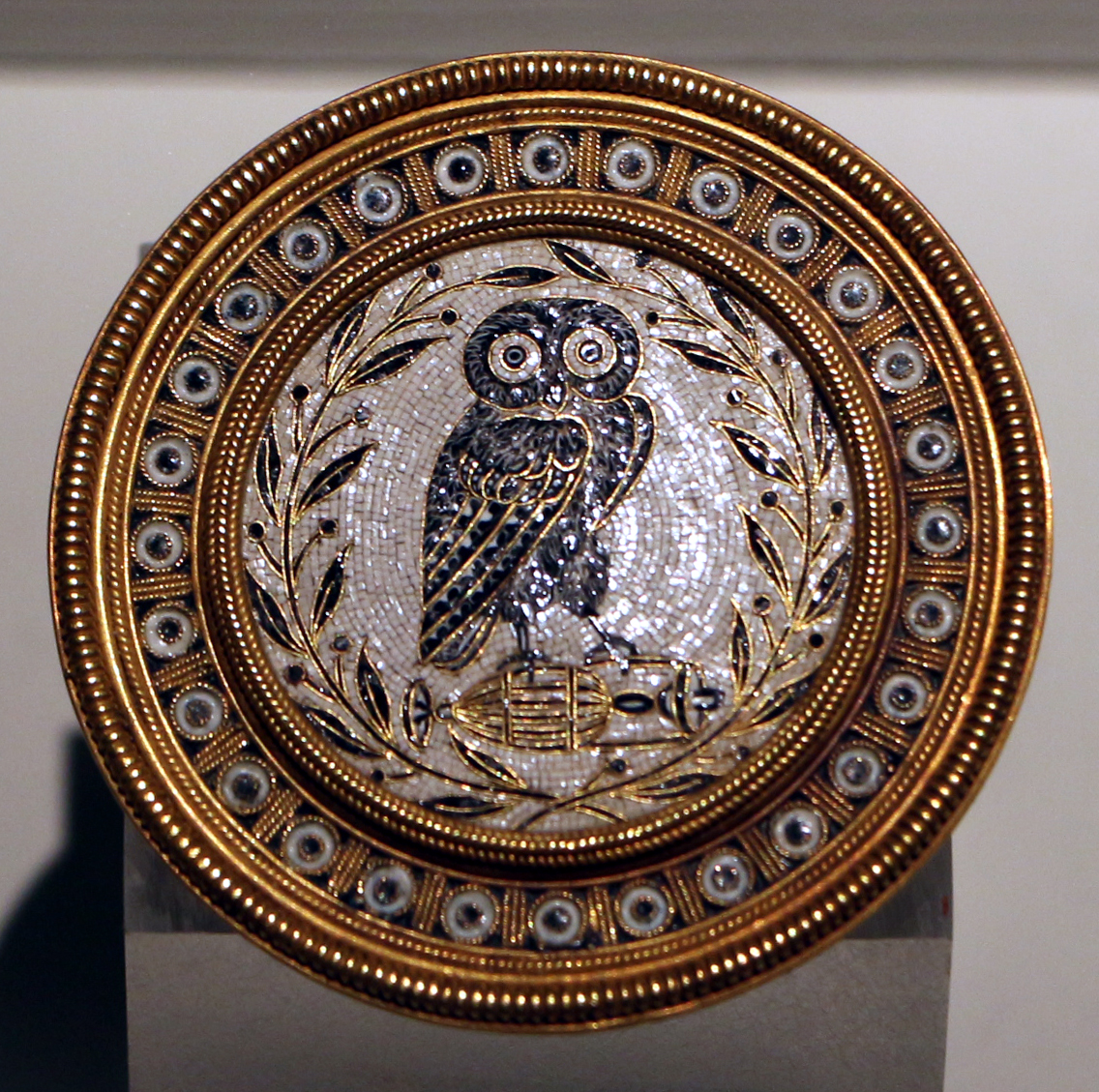
Castellani golds, made in imitation of the antique partly by incorporating original materials, 19th century, brooch with micromosaic owl

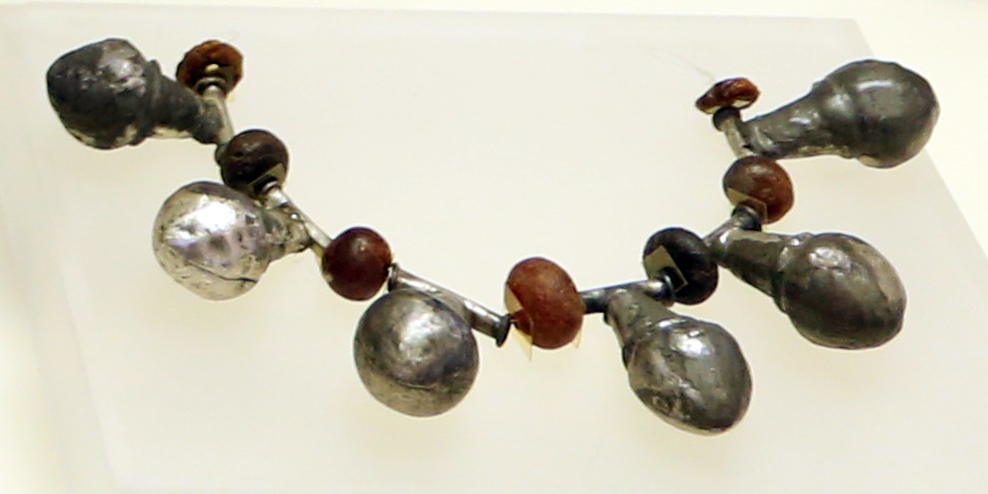
Part of a necklace with amber beads and silver pendants, from the Castellani Tomb in Palestrina, c. 700-675 BC. 01

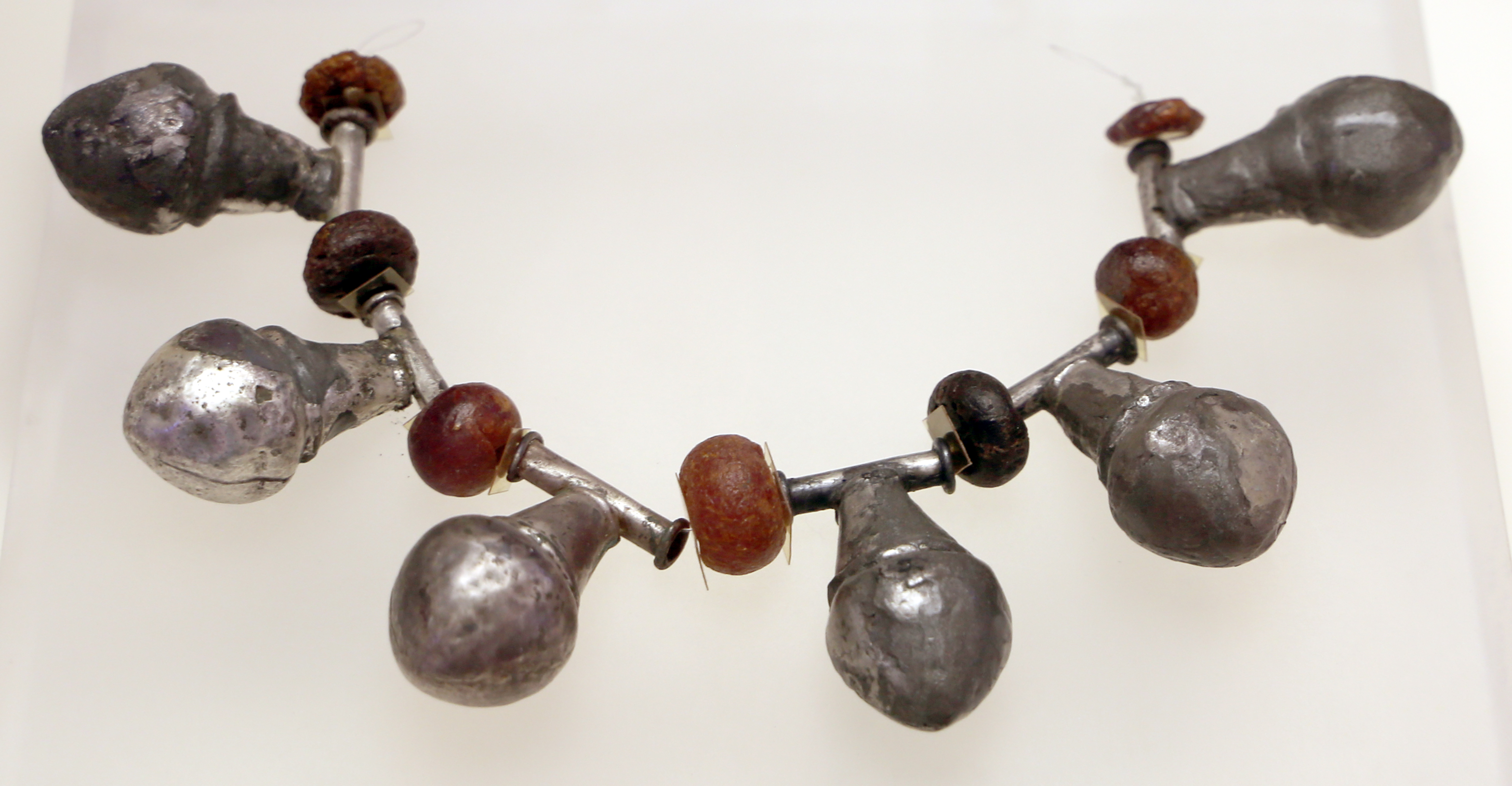
Part of a necklace with amber beads and silver pendants, from the Castellani Tomb in Palestrina, c. 700-675 BC. 02

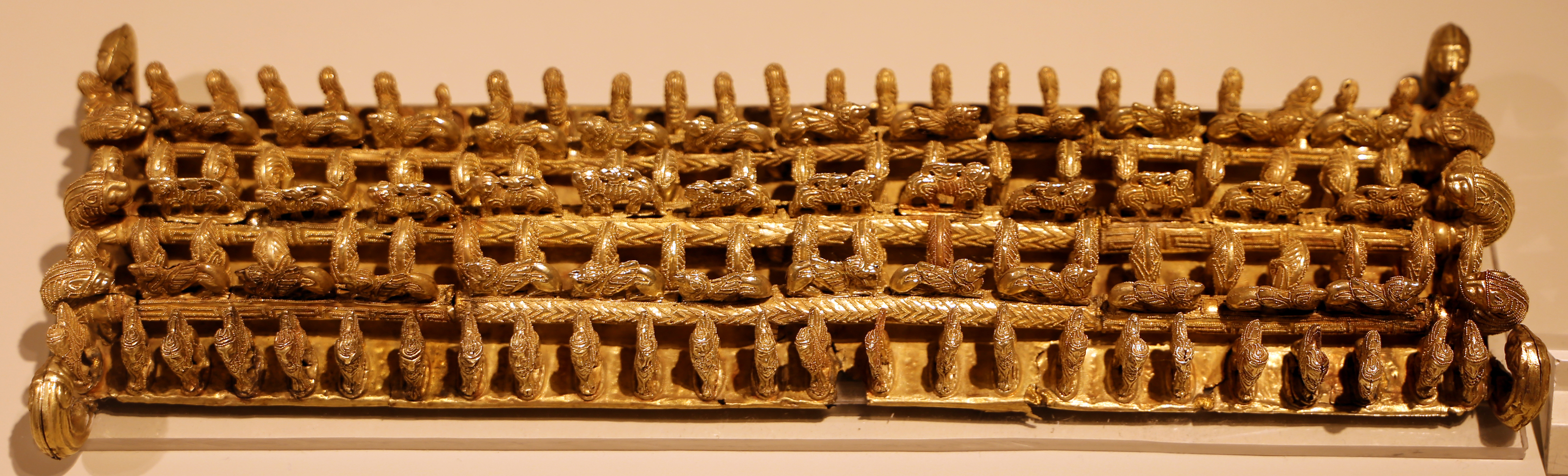
Gold plate with stylized animals, c. 675-650 BC, from the Barberini tomb in the necr. of the colombella in palestrina

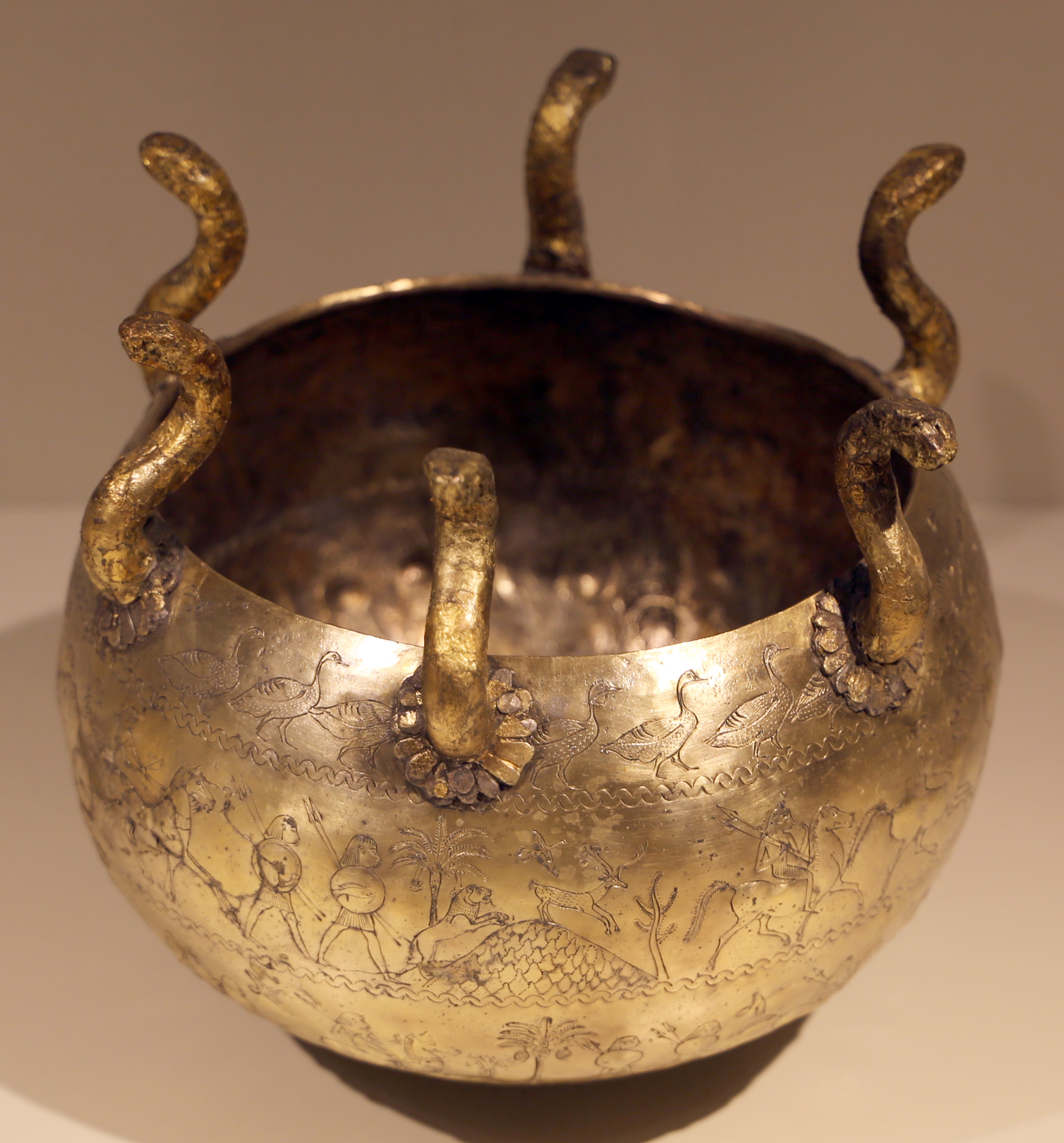
Small lebete with snake heads and engravings of birds, warriors and knights, silver, c. 675-650 BC, from t. bernardini necr. of the colombella in palestrina

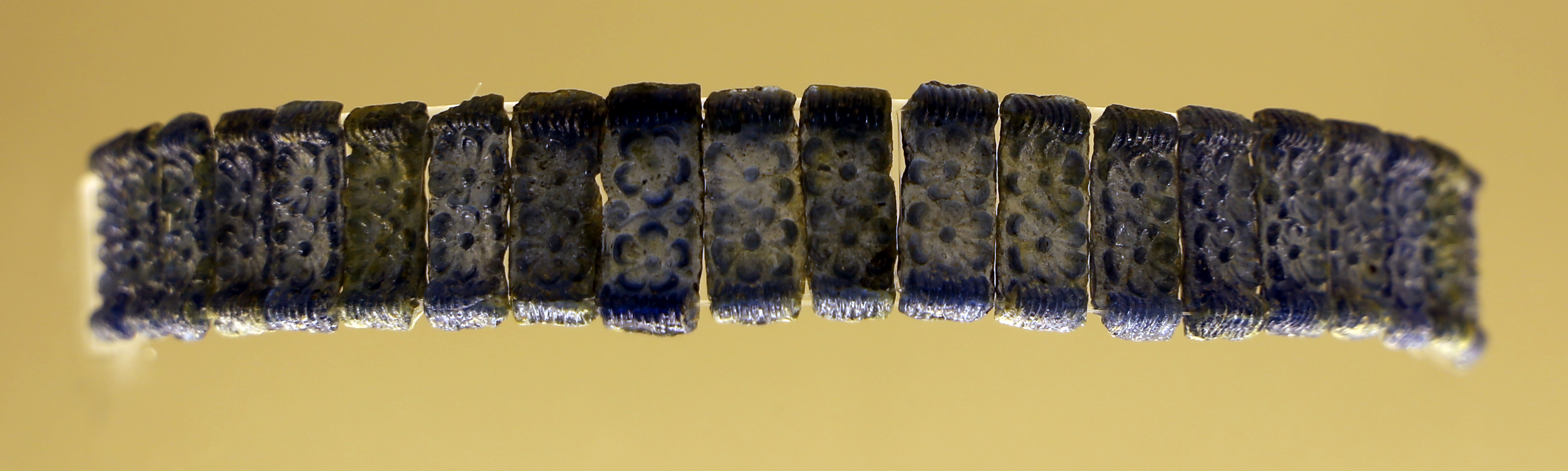
Late Mycenaean blue glass diadem plaques, from Rhodes, 14th-13th century BC

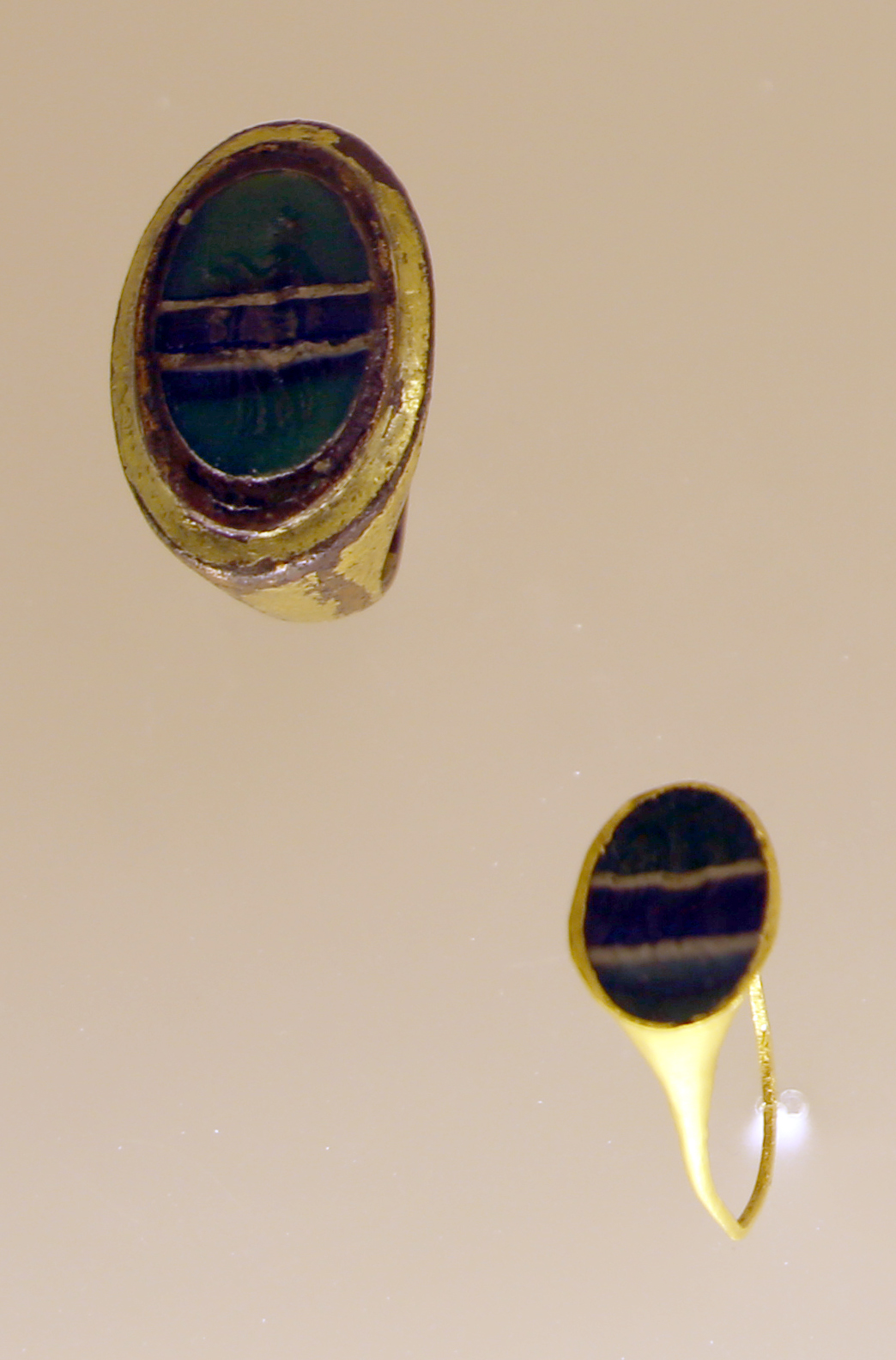
Rome, republic or empire, goldsmiths, 1st century BC-3rd AD, rings 01

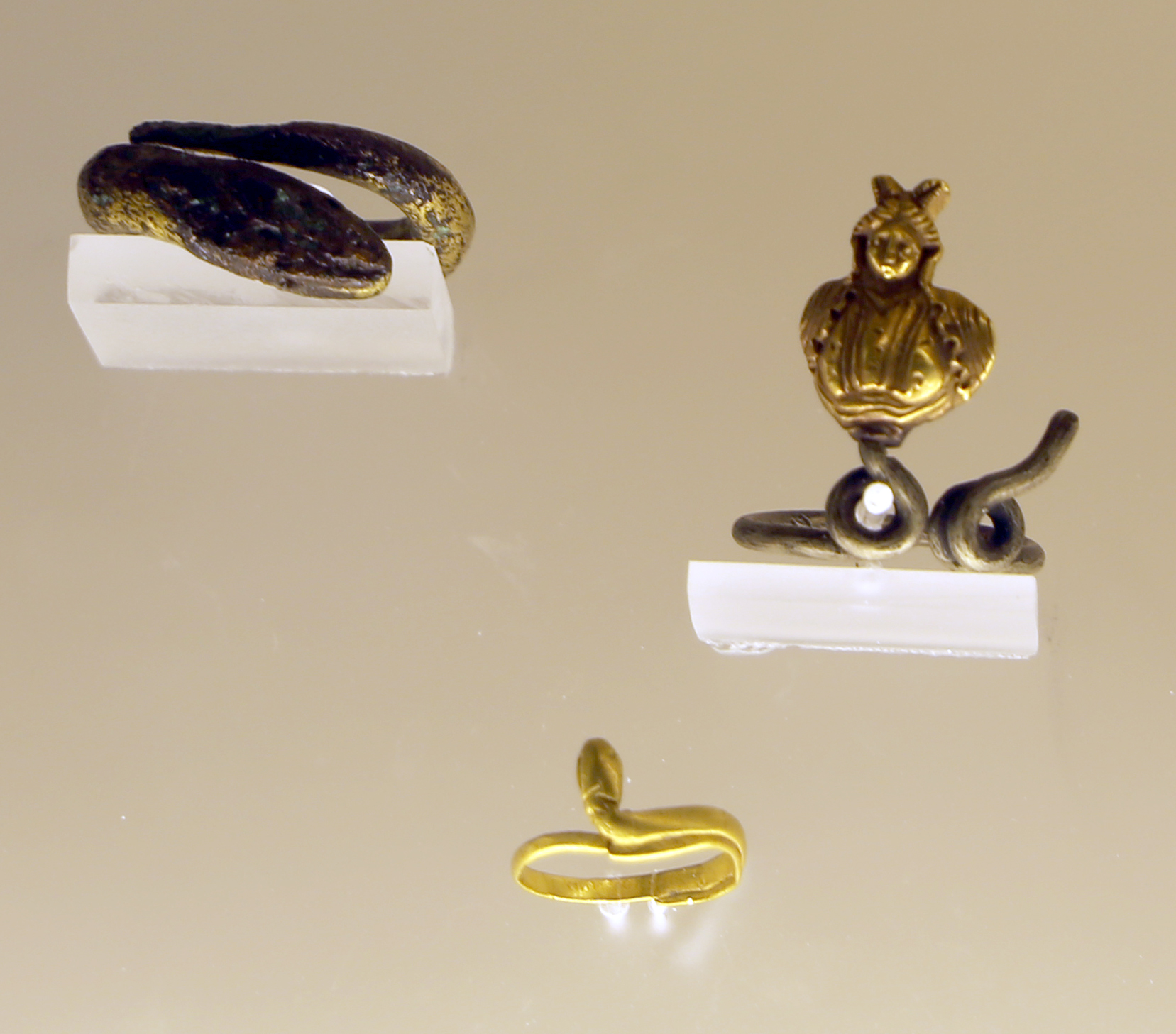
Rome, republic or empire, goldsmiths, 1st century BC-3rd AD, snake rings and with a bust of osiris

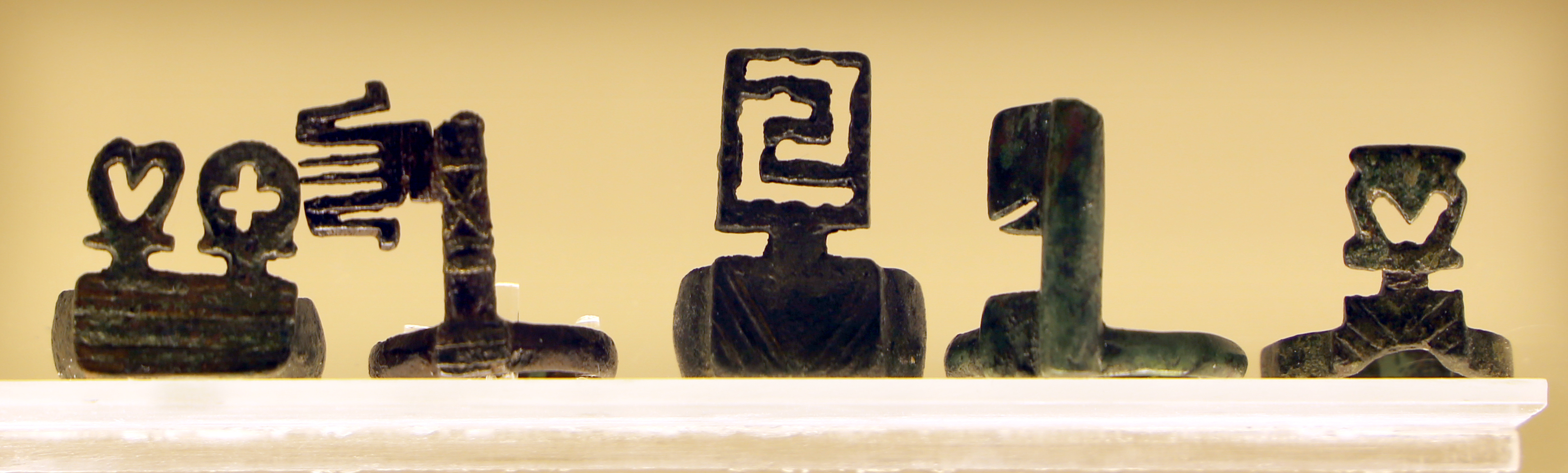
Rome, republic or empire, goldsmiths, 1st century BC-3rd AD, iron key rings for soldiers responsible for castra

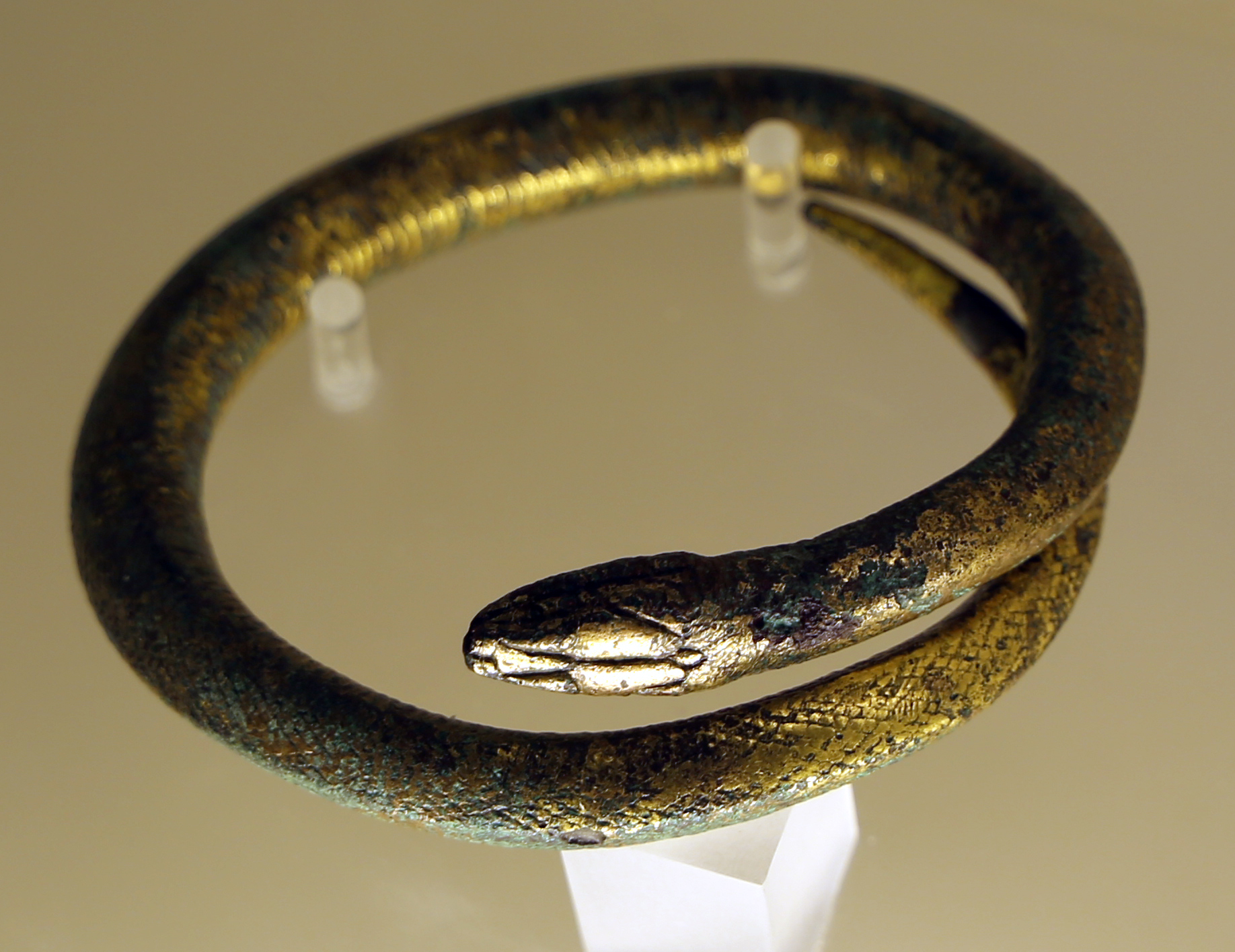
Rome, republic or empire, goldsmiths, 1st century BC-3rd AD, snake armilla

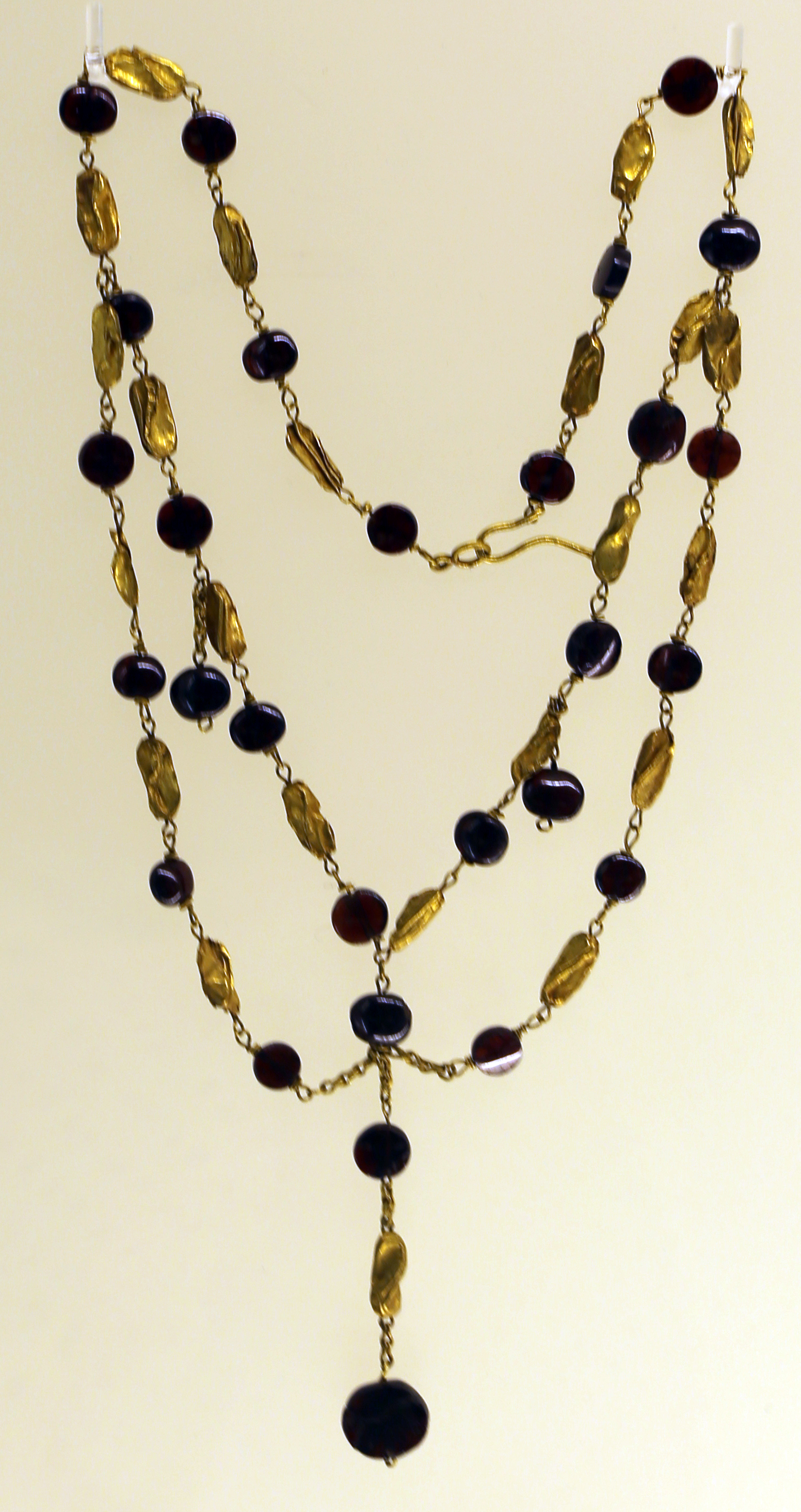
Rome, republic or empire, goldsmiths, 1st century BC-3rd AD, necklace

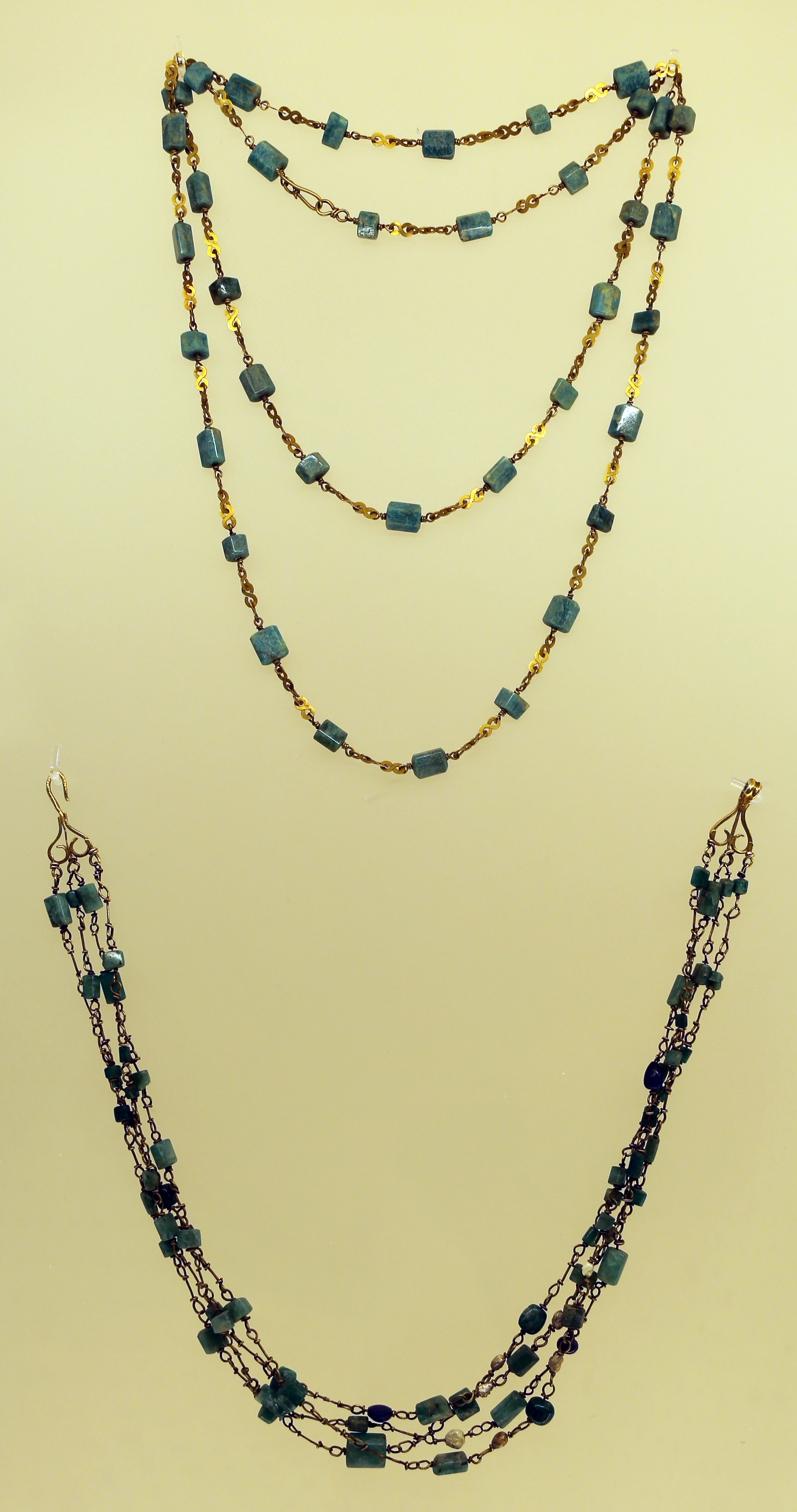
Rome, republic or empire, goldsmithery, 1st century BC-3rd AD, gold and precious stone necklaces

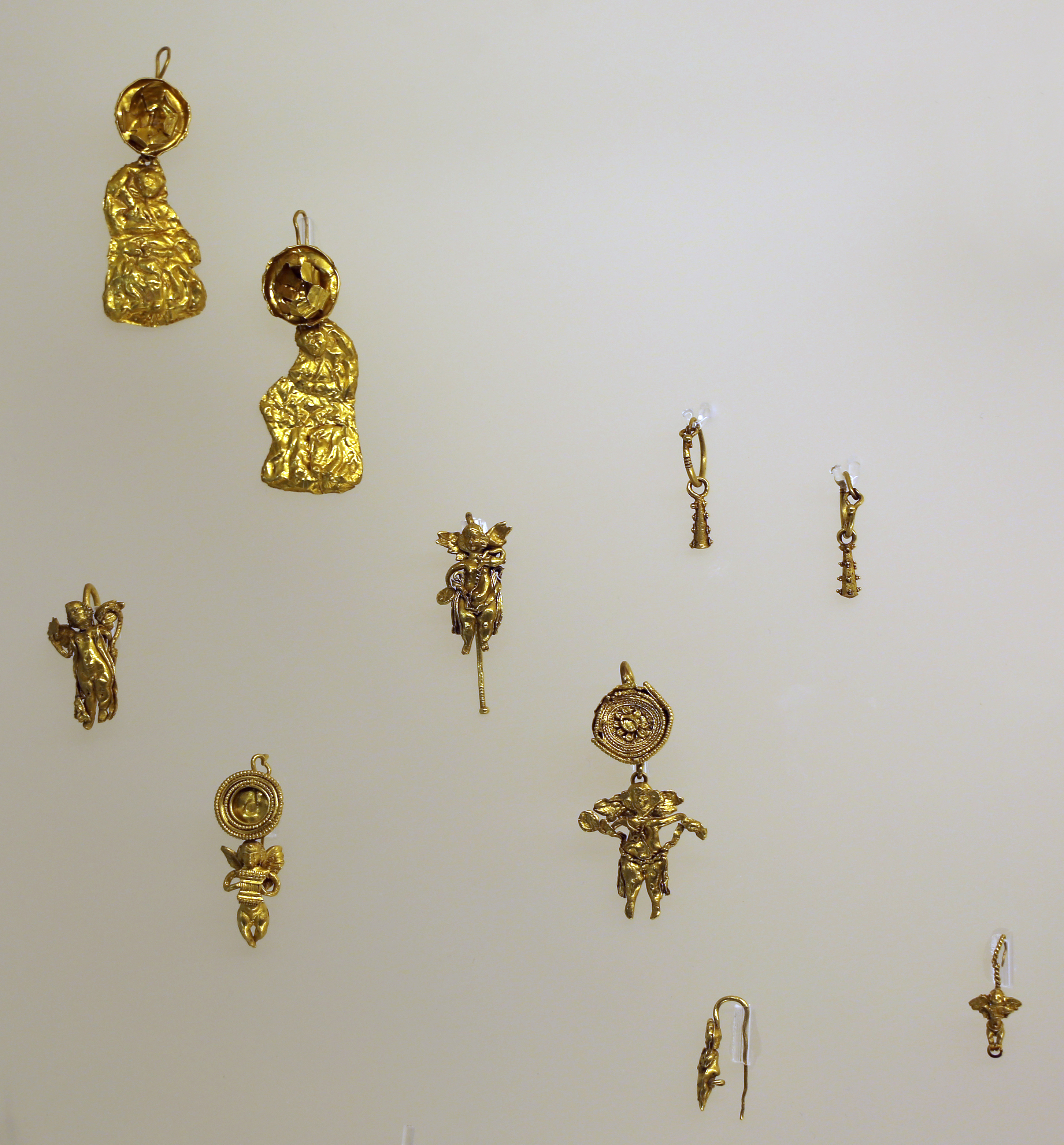
Rome, republic or empire, jewellery, 1st century BC-3rd AD, earrings with pendants

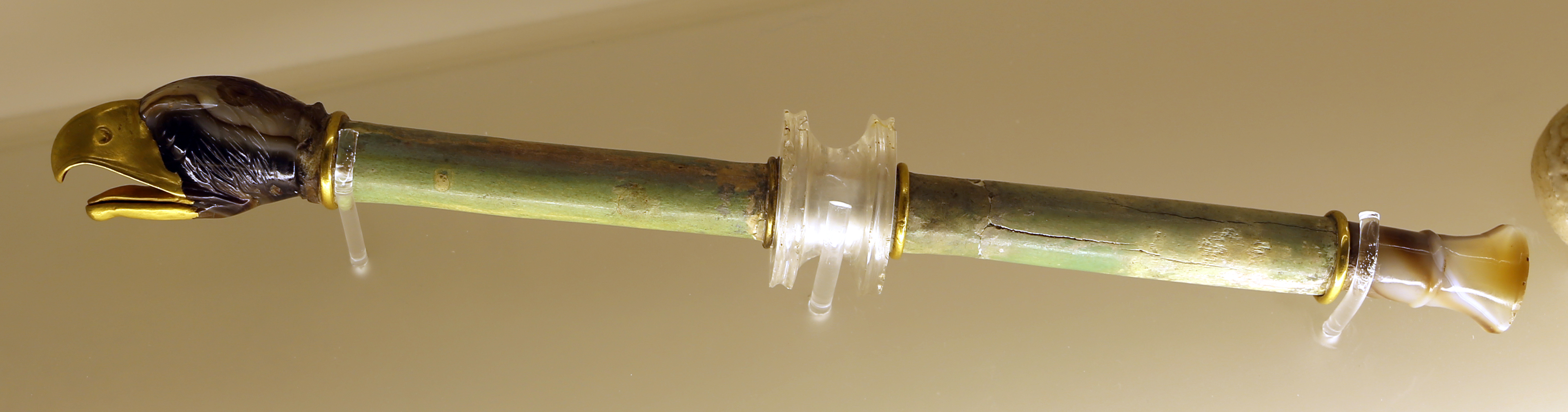
Rome, republic or empire, goldsmiths, 1st century BC-3rd AD, scepter with eagle's head 01

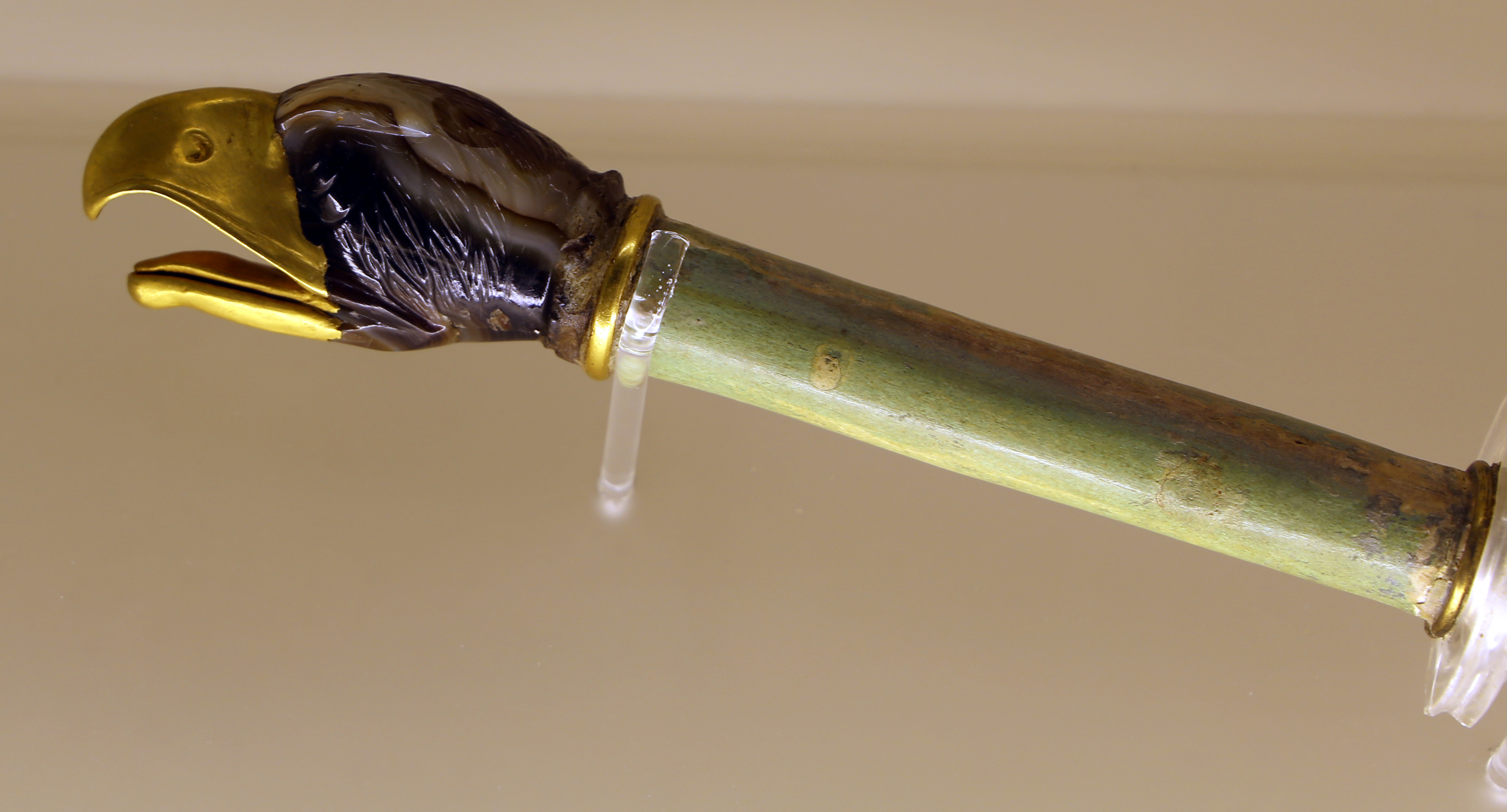
Rome, republic or empire, goldsmiths, 1st century BC-3rd AD, scepter with eagle's head 02

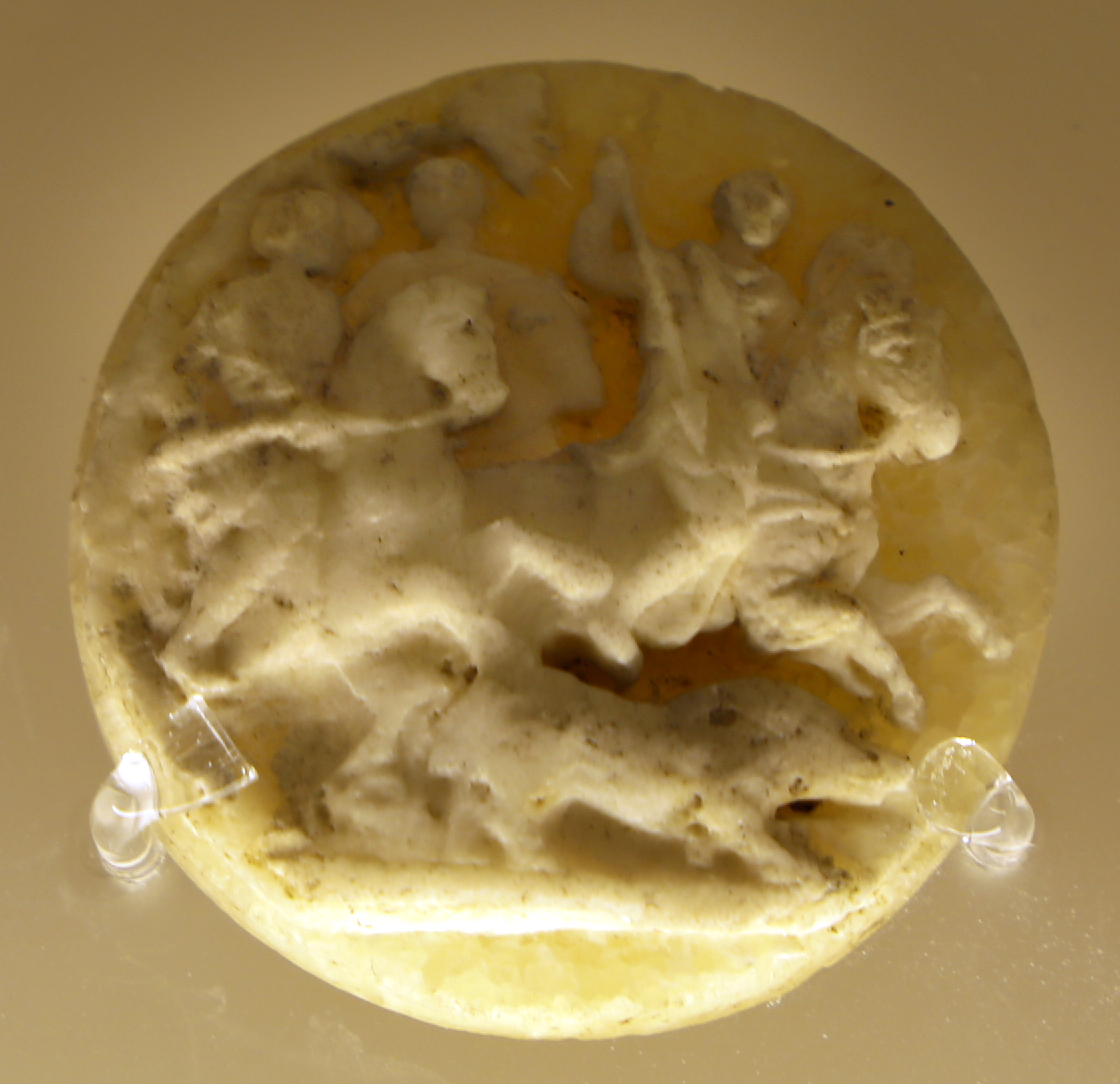
Rome, republic or empire, goldsmiths, 1st century BC-3rd AD, ivory tondo with Calydonian hunting

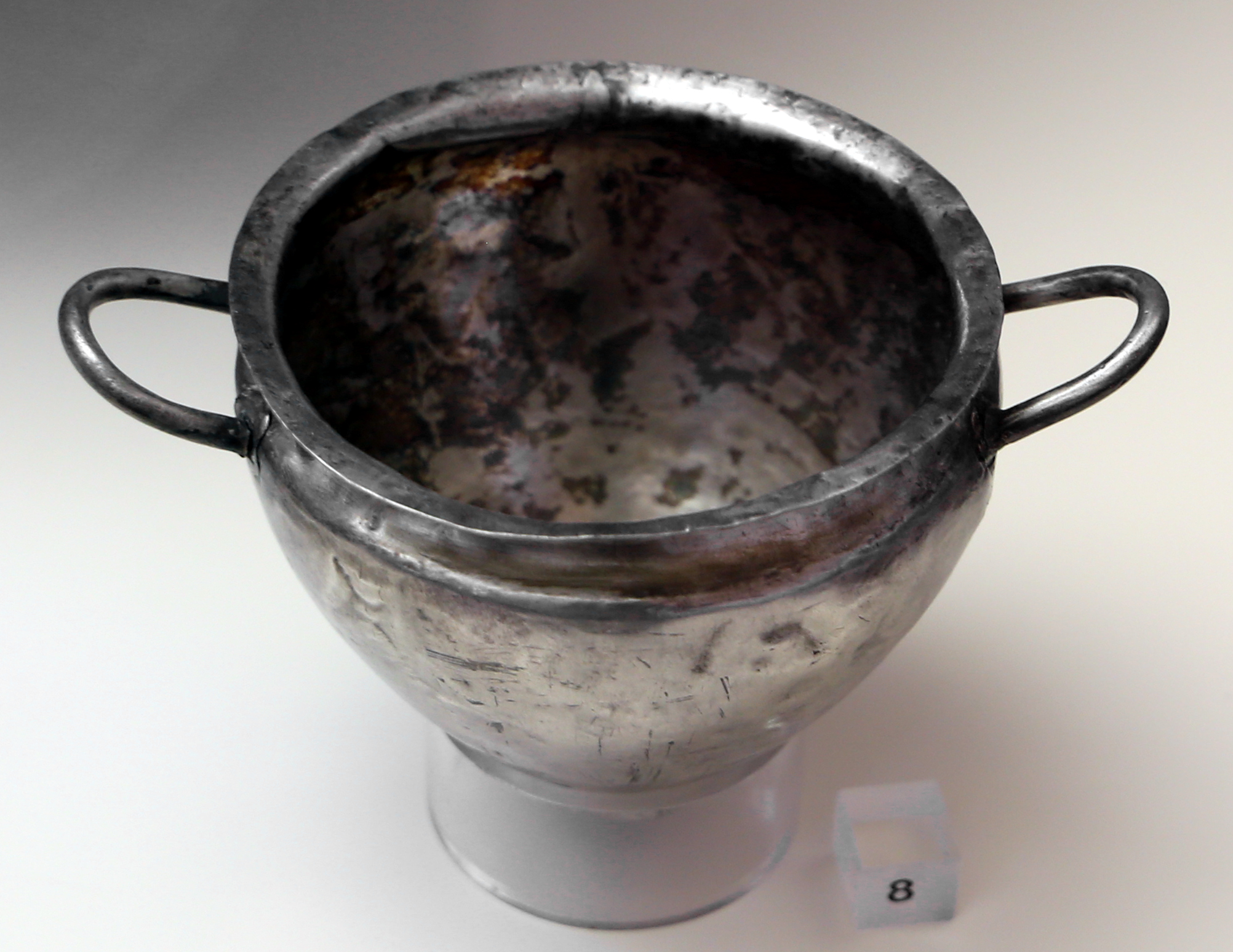
Skiphos in silver foil, from the castellani tomb in palestrina, c.700-675 BC

== Bibliography ==
- G. Bordenache Battaglia, «CASTELLANI». In: Dizionario Biografico degli Italiani, Roma: Istituto della Enciclopedia Italiana, 1978 (on-line).
- Ministero per i Beni e le Attività culturali, Soprintendenza per i Beni Archeologici del Lazio, I Castellani e l'oreficeria archeologica italiana : New York, the bard graduate center for studies in the decorative arts, 18 novembre 2004-6 febbraio 2005; Londra, Somerset house, 5 maggio-18 settembre 2005; Roma, Museo Nazionale Etrusco di Villa Giulia, 11 novembre 2005-26 febbraio 2006, Roma: "L'Erma" di Bretschneider, 2005. ISBN 88-8265-354-4 (Google books).
- Sante Guido, L'oreficeria sacra dei Castellani in Vaticano, Città del Vaticano: Edizioni Capitolo Vaticano, 2011 - (Archivium Sancti Petri). ISBN 9788863390223.
- Sante Guido, Il Calice Castellani nel Museo della Basilica Papale di Santa Maria Maggiore , Roma: Lisanti Editore - (Studia Liberiana IV). ISBN 9788890583810.
