= Oneiros =

Personification of dreams in Greek mythology

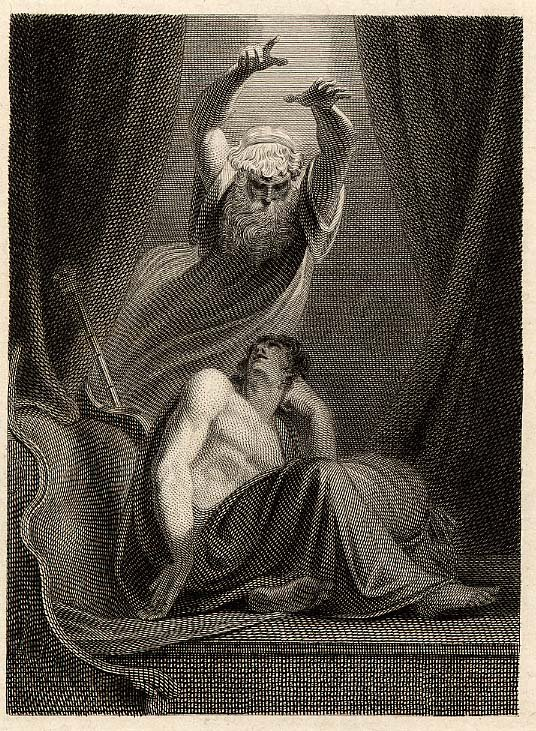
"Nestor Appearing in a Dream to Agamemnon" (1805) by Henry Fuseli

In Greek mythology, dreams were sometimes personified as Oneiros (Ancient Greek: Ὄνειρος, lit. 'dream') or Oneiroi (Ὄνειροι, 'dreams'). In the Iliad of Homer, Zeus sends an Oneiros to appear to Agamemnon in a dream, while in Hesiod's Theogony, the Oneiroi are the sons of Nyx (Night), and brothers of Hypnos (Sleep).

== Sources ==
For the ancient Greeks, dreams were not generally personified. However, a few instances of the personification of dreams, some perhaps solely poetic, can be found in ancient Greek sources.

In Homer's Iliad, Zeus decides to send a "baleful dream" to Agamemnon, the commander of the Greek army during the Trojan War. An Oneiros is summoned by Zeus, and ordered to go to the camp of the Greeks at Troy and deliver a message from Zeus urging him to battle. The Oneiros goes quickly to Agamemnon's tent, and finding him asleep, stands above Agamemnon's head; taking the shape of Nestor, a trusted counselor to Agamemnon, the Oneiros speaks to Agamemnon, as Zeus had instructed him.

The Odyssey locates a "land of dreams" past the streams of Oceanus, close to Asphodel Meadows, where the spirits of the dead reside. In another passage of the Odyssey, truthful dreams are said to come through a gate made of horn, while deceitful dreams come through a gate made of ivory (see Gates of horn and ivory).

Hesiod, in his genealogical poem the Theogony, makes the "tribe of Dreams" (φῦλον Ὀνείρων), among the many offspring of Nyx (Night), without a father. Their siblings include: Moros (Doom), Ker (Destiny), Thanatos (Death), Hypnos (Sleep), Momus (Blame), Oizys (Pain), Keres (Destinies), Nemesis (Retribution), Eris (Discord), and other abstract personifications.

Euripides, in his play Hecuba, has Hecuba call "lady Earth" the "mother of black-winged dreams". The second-century AD geographer Pausanias mentions seeing statues of an Oneiros and Hypnos lulling a lion to sleep. He writes that the statue was surnamed Epidotes.

== Related figures ==
Related figures are the Somnia (Dreams), the thousand sons that the Latin poet Ovid gave to Somnus (Sleep), who appear in dreams. Ovid named three of the sons of Somnus: Morpheus, who appears in human guise, Phobetor, called Icelos by the gods, who appears as beasts, and Phantasos, who appears as inanimate objects.

== In modern culture ==
Oneiros appear in the episode "Babes in the Wood" of Over the Garden Wall in the song "Forward, Oneiroi!" as cherubs that take Greg to a land of dreams.
