= Somnus =

Roman deity, god of sleep

- God of sleep
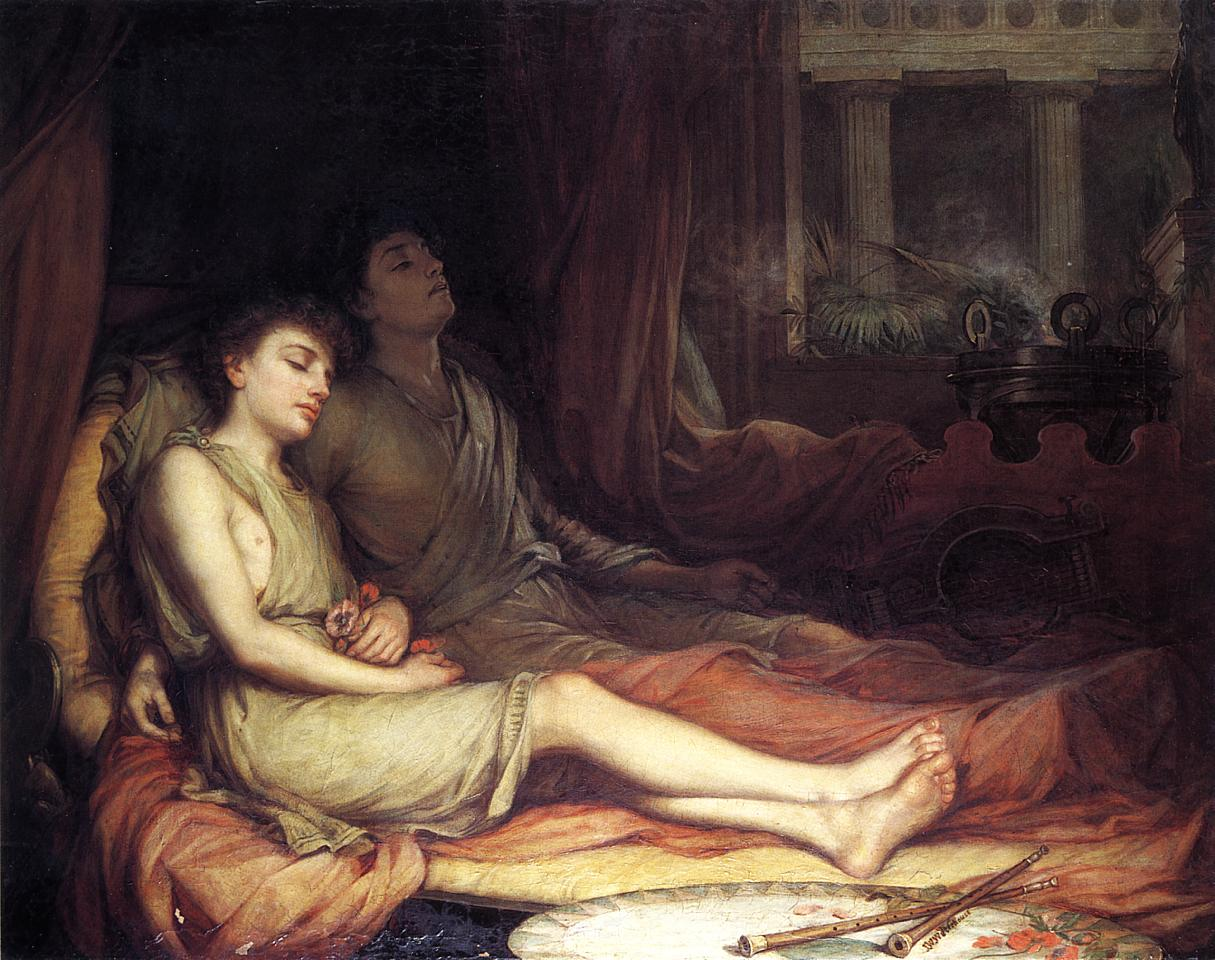
- Somnus and Mors, Sleep and His Half-Brother Death by John William Waterhouse
- Abode: Underworld

Genealogy
- Children: The Somnia, which included Morpheus, Phobetor, and Phantasos

In Roman mythology, Somnus ("sleep") is the personification of sleep. His Greek counterpart is Hypnos. Somnus resided in the underworld. According to Virgil, Somnus was the brother of Death (Mors), and according to Ovid, Somnus had a 'thousand' sons, the Somnia ('dream shapes'), who appear in dreams 'mimicking many forms'. Ovid named three of the sons of Somnus: Morpheus, who appears in human guise, Icelos / Phobetor, who appears as beasts, and Phantasos, who appears as inanimate objects.

== Greek tradition ==
In the Greek tradition, Hypnos (Sleep) was the brother of Thanatos (Death), and the son of Nyx (Night). According to Hesiod, Sleep, along with Death, live in the underworld, while in the Homeric tradition, although "the land of dreams" was located on the road to the underworld, near the great world-encircling river Oceanus, nearby the city of Cimmerians, Sleep himself lived on the island of Lemnos.

== Virgil ==
Following the Greek tradition, Virgil makes Sleep and Death brothers, and locates their dwellings next to each other, near the entrance of the underworld:

In the first courts and entrances of Hell
Sorrows and vengeful Cares on couches lie :
There sad Old Age abides, Diseases pale,
And Fear, and Hunger, temptress to all crime;
Want, base and vile, and, two dread shapes to see,
Bondage and Death : then Sleep, Death's next of kin;

Somnus makes a brief appearance in Virgil's Aeneid. Virgil has Somnus cause Palinurus, the helmsman of Aeneas's ship, to fall asleep while steering the ship at night. Somnus, in the guise of Phorbas, a shipmate, appears to Palinurus and offers to take over, so that Palinurus might rest awhile. But Palinurus refused the offer, so Somnus uses a branch, "imbued" with the power of underworld's river Styx, to sprinkle Palinurus with water from the river Lethe, the underworld's river of forgetfulness. Palinurus then falls asleep, and Somnus pushes him overboard.

== Ovid ==
Somnus, and his sons the Somnia appear in Ovid's poem Metamorphoses. Ovid, like Virgil before him, followed Hesiod in making Sleep a denizen of the underworld. However, recalling the location of the 'land of dreams' in the Odyssey, Ovid also locates the dwelling of Somnus "near the land of the Cimmerians". Ovid has Somnus live in a cave, describing "the home and chamber of sluggish Sleep" as a place where:

Phoebus [the Sun] can never enter ... with his rising, noontide, or setting rays. Clouds of vapour breathe forth from the earth, and dusky twilight shadows. There no wakeful, crested cock with his loud crowing summons the dawn; no watch-dog breaks the deep silence with his baying, or goose, more watchful than the dog. There is no sound of wild beast or of cattle, of branches rustling in the breeze, no clamorous tongues of men. There mute silence dwells.

In keeping with this theme of "silence", Ovid says that Somnus' house has no doors, "lest some turning hinge should creak".

Like Virgil, Ovid associates Somnus with the underworld's river Lethe, which Ovid has flowing from the bottom of Somnus' cave, and "whose waves, gently murmuring over the gravelly bed, invite to slumber." Near the entrance bloom sleep-inducing poppies and other herbs, which Nox (Night) uses to spread sleep over "the darkened lands." Although Ovid connects Night with Sleep, he makes no mention of Night being Sleep's mother as she is in Hesiod.

In the center of the main chamber, Somnus lies "in languorous repose" on a "downy-soft" black couch, surrounded by his innumerable sons, the "empty dream-shapes [Somnia vana], mimicking many forms, many as ears of grain in harvest-time, as leaves upon the trees, as sands cast on the shore." Ovid names three of these form-mimicking "dream shapes": Morpheus, Icelos/Phobetor, and Phantasos. About Morpheus, Ovid says "no other is more skilled than he in representing the gait, the features, and the speech of men; the clothing also and the accustomed words of each he represents." Another son called Icelos by the gods, but Phobetor by men, "takes the form of beast or bird or the long serpent", and a third son named Phantasos "puts on deceptive shapes of earth, rocks, water, trees, all lifeless things".

In Book 11 of the Metamorphoses, Somnus becomes involved in Ovid's telling of the love story of Ceyx and his wife Alcyone. Ceyx has died in a storm at sea. Juno the queen of the gods, sends her messenger Iris to the sleeping Somnus' cave, to command Somnus to send a dream to Alcyone, in the form of Alcyone's husband Ceyx. Arriving at the cave, Iris brushes aside the many sleeping Somnia blocking her way, and her brightly gleaming clothes wake Somnus from his deep slumber. Iris addresses Somnus as "thou rest of all things, Sleep, mildest of the gods, balm of the soul, who puttest care to flight, soothest our bodies worn with hard ministries, and preparest them for toil again!", then orders Somnus to "Fashion a shape that shall seem true form" to be sent to Alcyone. Iris immediately leaves before she herself is overcome with sleep, and Somnus wakes Morpheus to carry out what Juno has commanded, then goes back to sleep on his couch.

Like other gods associated with sleep, Ovid makes Somnus winged.
