= Epiales =

Ghost daemon in Greek mythology

In Greek mythology, Epiales (Ancient Greek: Ἠπιάλης, romanized: Epiálēs) was a ghost daemon. Alternate spellings of the name were Epialos (Ἠπίαλος), Epioles (Ἠπιόλης), Epialtes (Ἐπιάλτης) or Ephialtes (Ἐφιάλτης).

== Mythology ==
Epiales was also known as Melas Oneiros (Black Dream).

"The words epialos, epiales and epioles denote (1) the feverish chill (2) the daimon who assaults sleepers. Homer and most writers have epioles with the e; the form in -os means something different, namely the feverish chill . . . Alkaios (Alcaeus) called it epialos. Apollonios says that Epialtes itself (the nighmare daimon) is called Epiales and by a change of a to o Epioles." "[The goddess Gaia (Earth) is invoked to drive away a nightmare :] Like a spider, he [a rapist] is carrying me [a woman] seaward step by step--a nightmare (oneiros), a black nightmare (melas oneiros)! Oh! Oh! Mother Earth (Ma Ge), mother Earth (Ma Ge), avert his fearful cries! O father Zeus, son of Ge (Earth)!"

== See also ==
- Oneiroi
- Phobetor
