= Somnia =

Somnia may refer to

- Somnia (film), a 2016 American horror film
- Somnia, a book of poetry by A. W. Yrjänä
- The Somnia, the sons of Somnus, the Roman god of sleep
- Somnia (B.o.B album), a 2020 album by American rapper B.o.B
- Somnia (Hawkwind album), a 2021 album by British rock band Hawkwind
