= Epidotes =

Ancient Greek divinity and epithet

In Greek mythology, Epidotes (Ancient Greek: Ἐπιδώτης) was a divinity who was worshipped at Lacedaemon, and averted the anger of Zeus Hicesius (Greek: Ζευς Ικέσιος) for a crime committed by the Spartan general Pausanias.

Epidotes, meaning the "liberal giver" or "bountiful", occurs also as an epithet of other divinities, such as Zeus at Mantineia and Sparta, and of Hypnos and Oneiros at Sicyon, who had a statue in the temple of Asclepius there, which represented them in the act of sending a lion to sleep, and lastly of the beneficent gods, to whom a second-century senator, Antoninus, built a sanctuary at Epidaurus.
