= Morpheus =

Deity associated with sleep and dreams

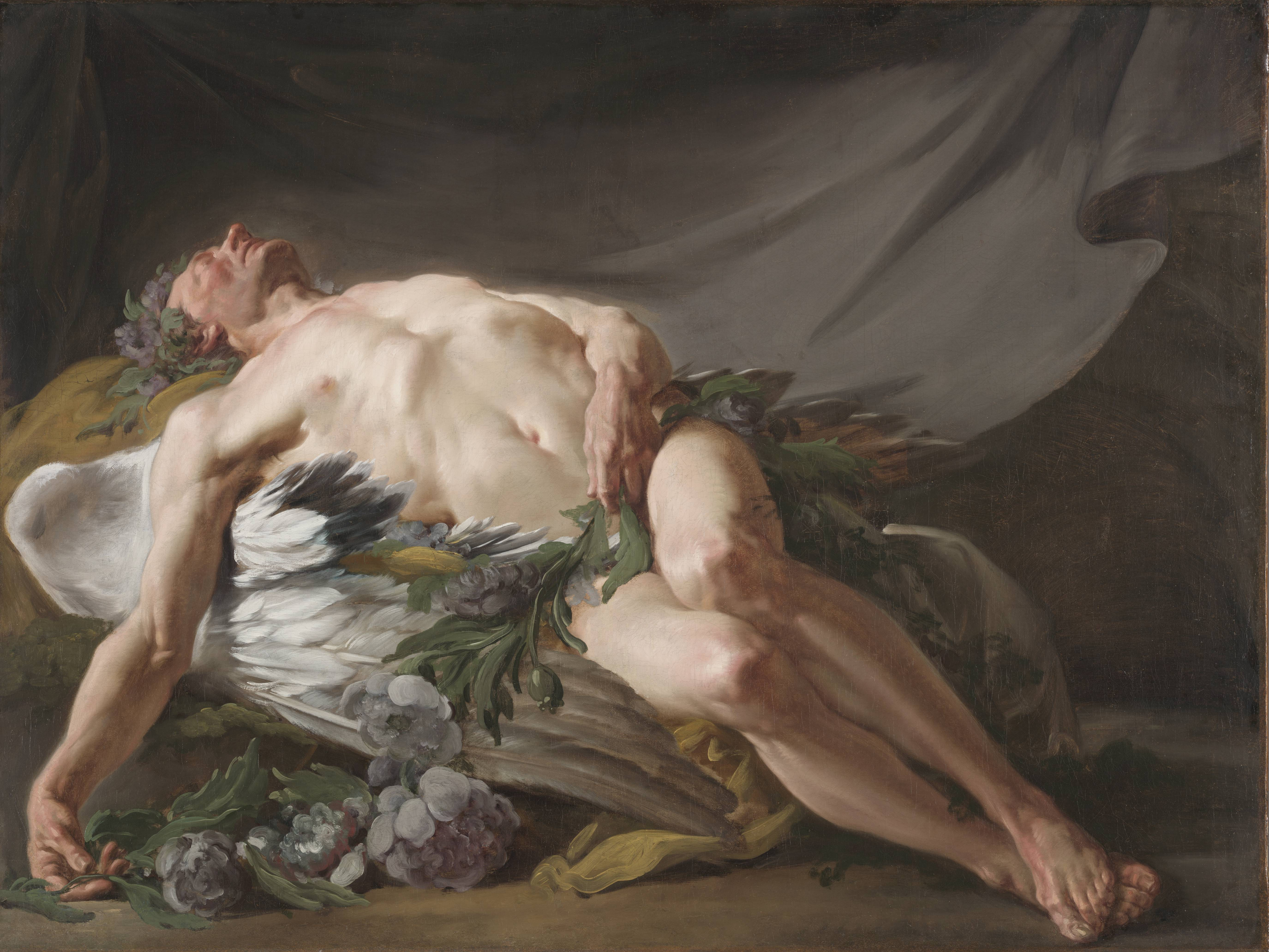
Morpheus, Jean-Bernard Restout (c. 1771)

Morpheus (Ancient Greek: Μορφεύς, romanized: Morpheús 'Fashioner', derived from Ancient Greek: μορφή, romanized: morphḗ, meaning 'form, shape') is a god associated with sleep and dreams. In Ovid's Metamorphoses, he is the son of Somnus (Sleep, the Roman counterpart of Hypnos) and appears in dreams in human form. From the Middle Ages, the name began to stand more generally for the god of dreams, or of sleep.

== Ovid ==
The only ancient mention of Morpheus occurs in Ovid's Metamorphoses, where Ovid tells of the story of Ceyx and his wife Alcyone who were transformed into birds. In Ovid's account, Juno (via the messenger goddess Iris) sends Morpheus to appear to Alcyone in a dream, as her husband Ceyx, to tell her of his death.

Ovid makes Morpheus one of the thousand sons of Somnus (Sleep). His name derives from the Greek word for form (μορφή), and his function was apparently to appear in dreams in human guise. According to Ovid "no other is more skilled than he in representing the gait, the features, and the speech of men; the clothing also and the accustomed words of each he represents." As with other gods associated with sleep, Ovid presents Morpheus as winged.

Ovid called Morpheus and his brothers, the other sons of Somnus, the Somnia ("dream shapes"), saying that they appear in dreams "mimicking many forms". Ovid gives names to two more of these sons of Sleep. One called Icelos ('Like'), by the gods, but Phobetor ('Frightener') by humans, "takes the form of beast or bird or the long serpent", and Phantasos ('Fantasy'), who "puts on deceptive shapes of earth, rocks, water, trees, all lifeless things".

The three brothers' names are found nowhere earlier than Ovid and are perhaps Ovidian inventions. Tripp calls these three figures "literary, not mythical concepts". However, Griffin suggests that this division of dream forms between Morpheus and his brothers, possibly including their names, may have been of Hellenistic origin.

== Gallery ==
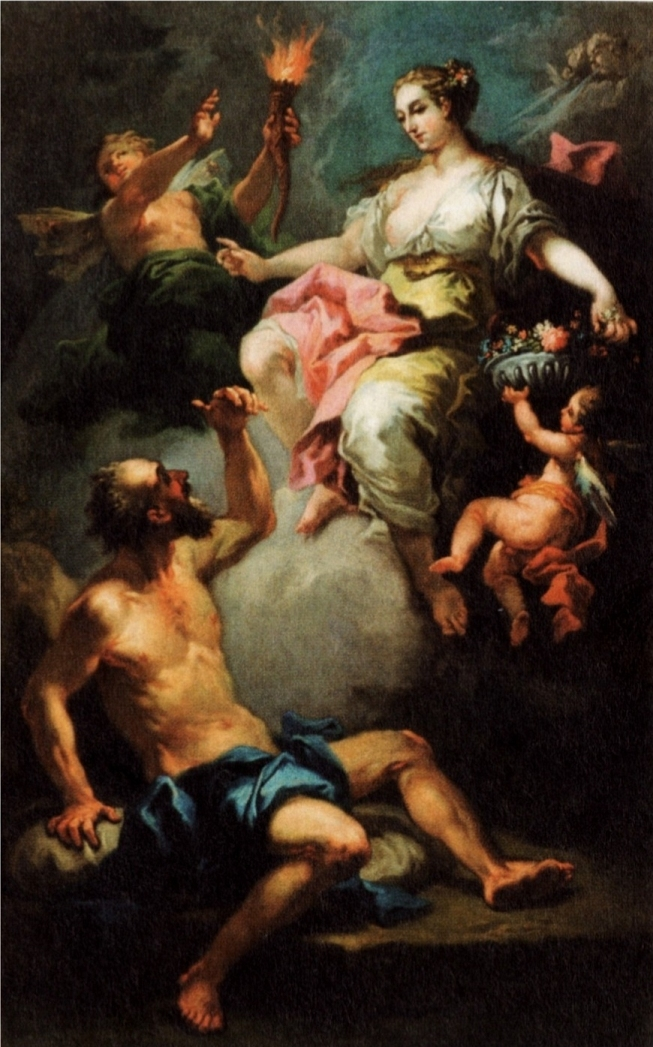
Aurora wakes Morpheus by Bartolomeo Altomonte (1769)

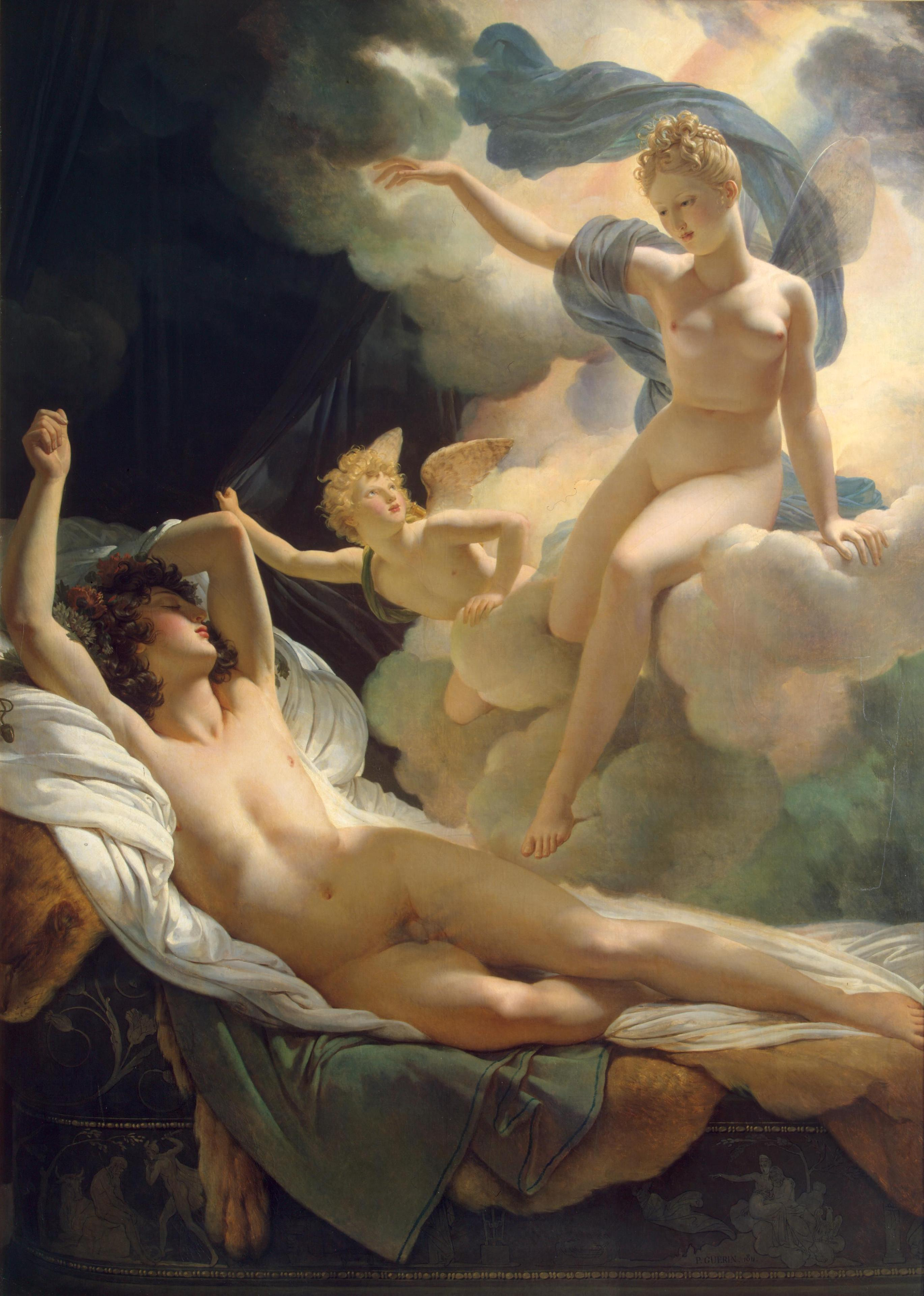
Morpheus and Iris, by Pierre-Narcisse Guérin, 1811 Hermitage Museum

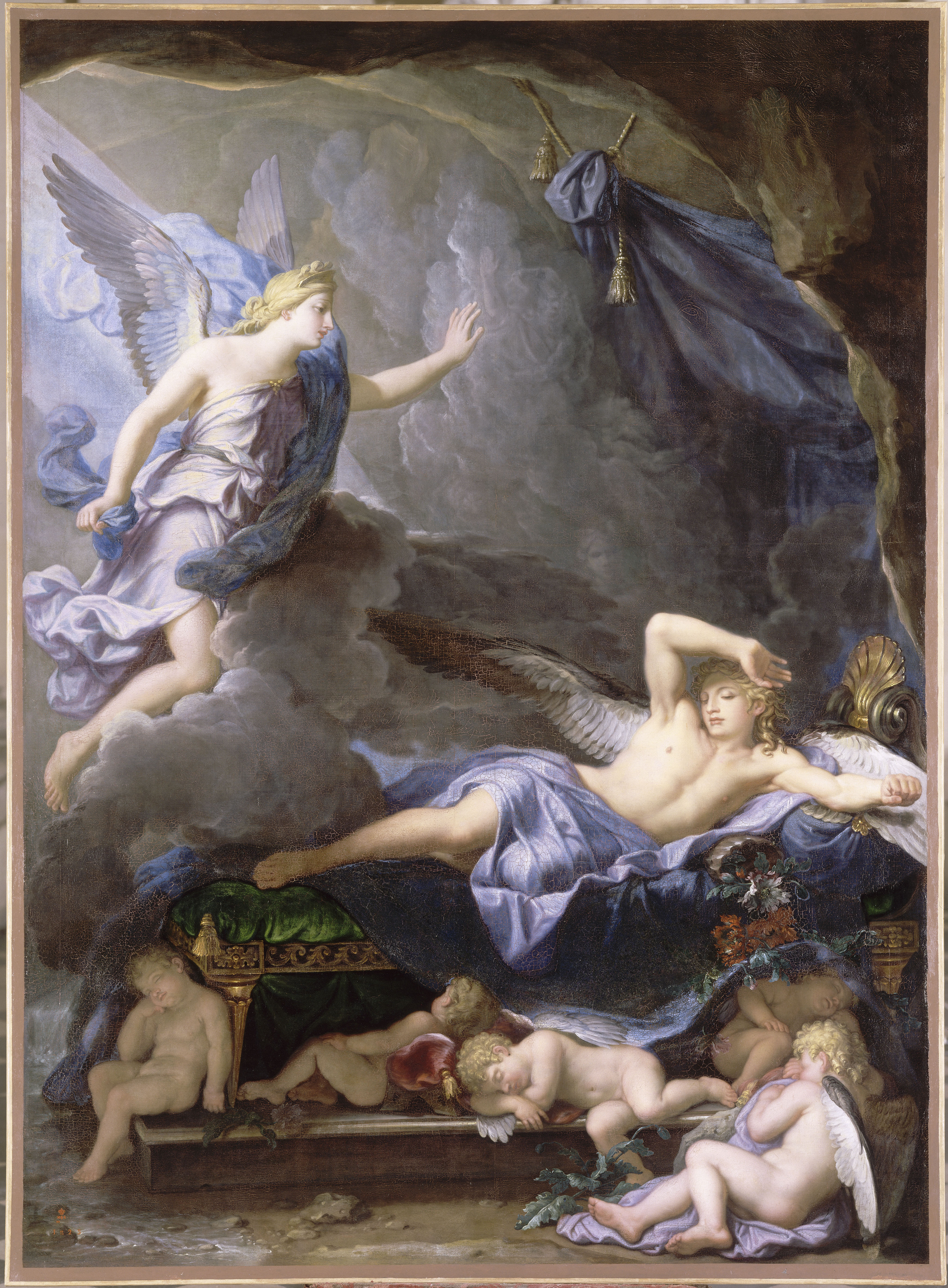
Morpheus awakening as Iris draws near by René-Antoine Houasse (1690)

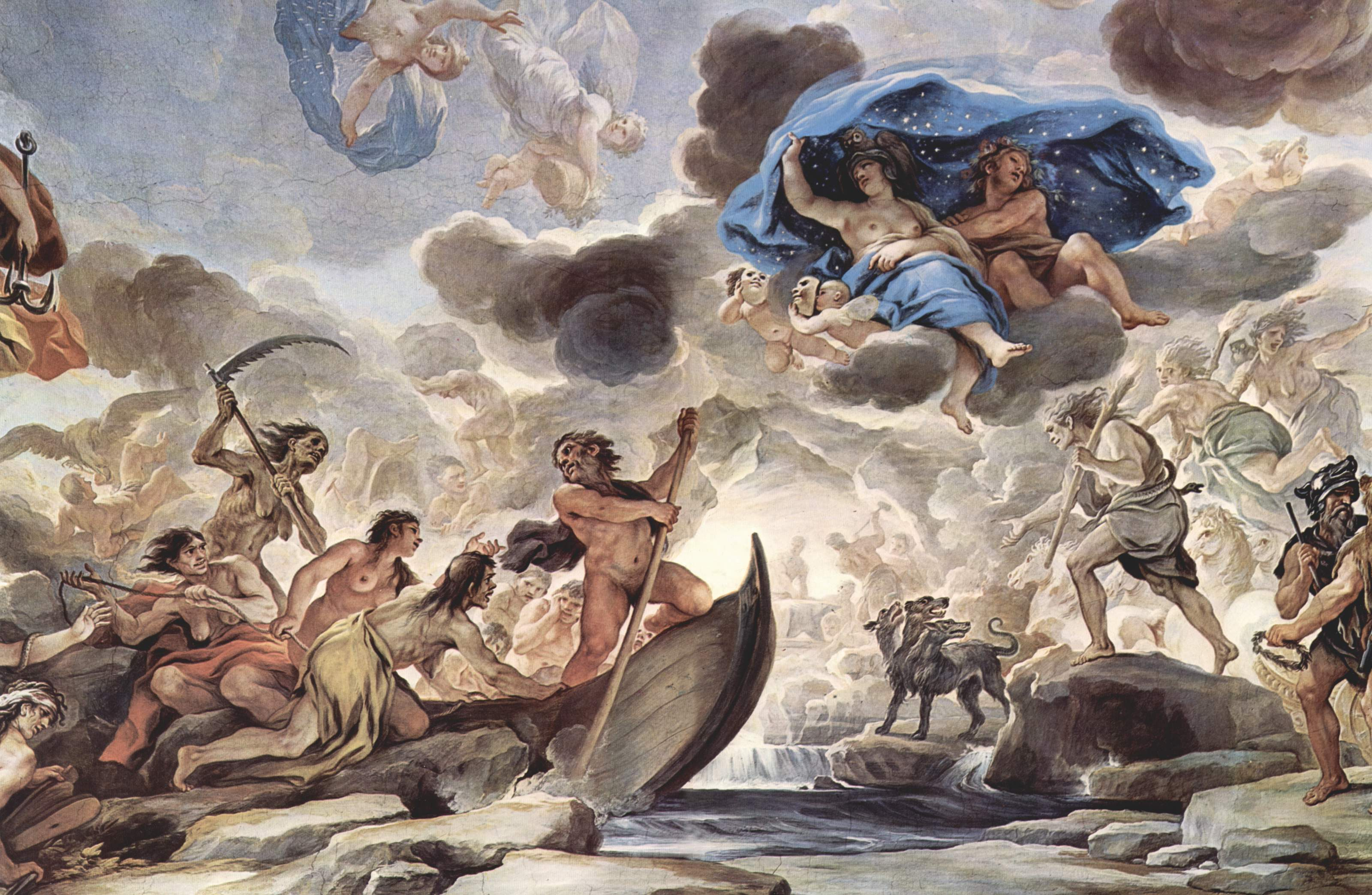
Fresco in the gallery of the Palazzo Medici-Riccardi in Florence: Charon's boat, the sleep of Night and Morpheus by Luca Giordano (1684–1686)

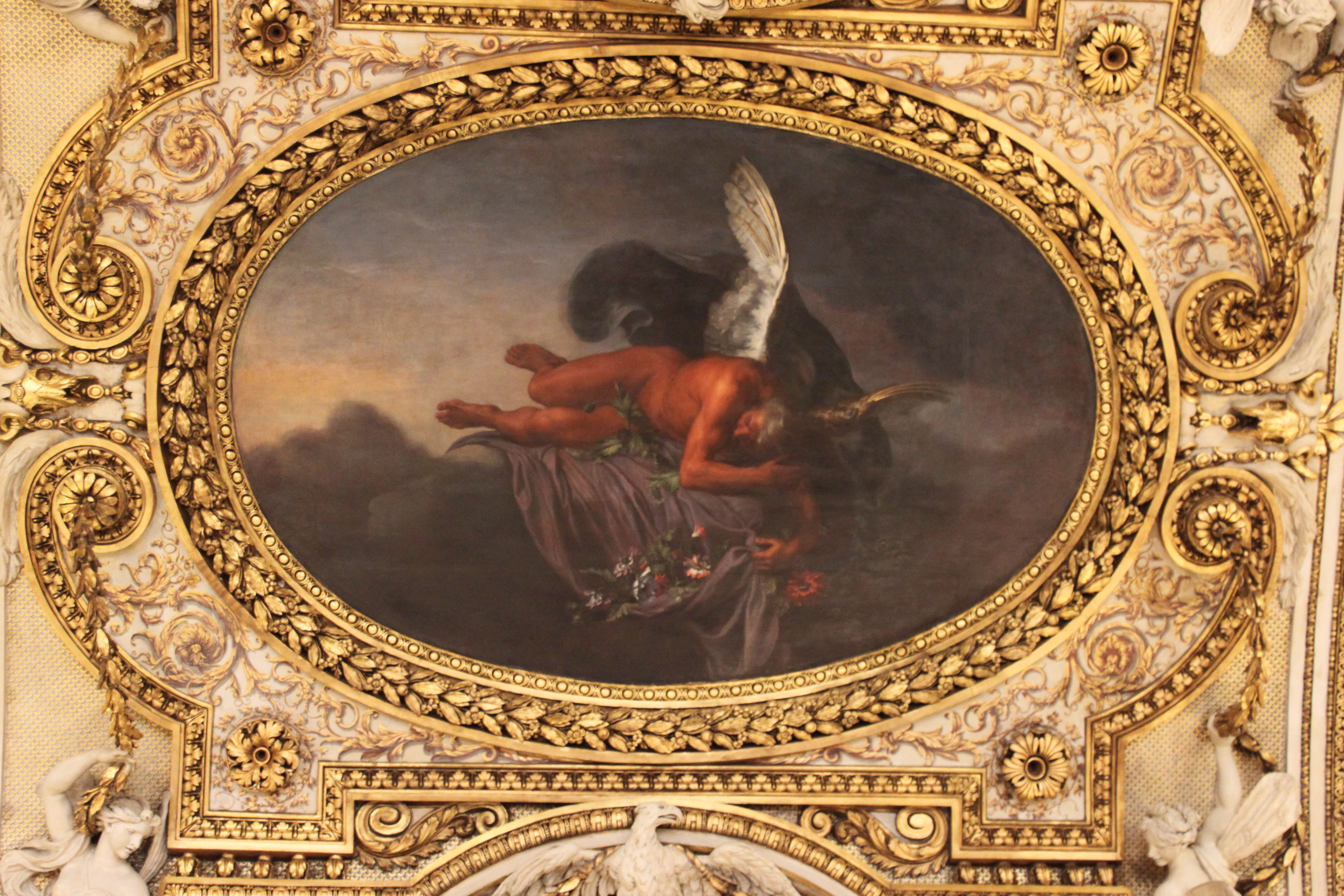
Evening or Morpheus by Charles Le Brun

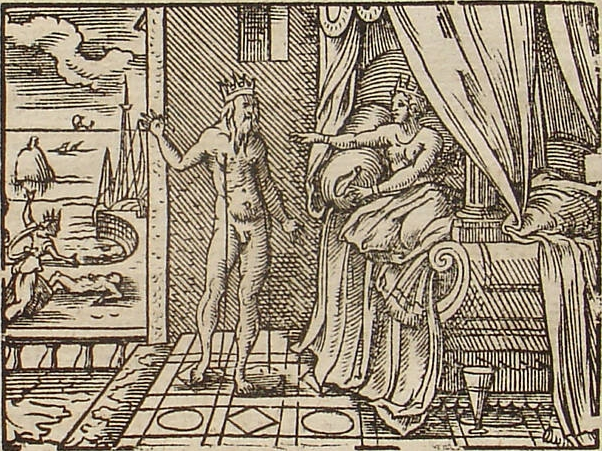
Morpheus appears to Alcyone. Engraving by Virgil Solis for Ovid's Metamorphoses Book XI, 650–749.

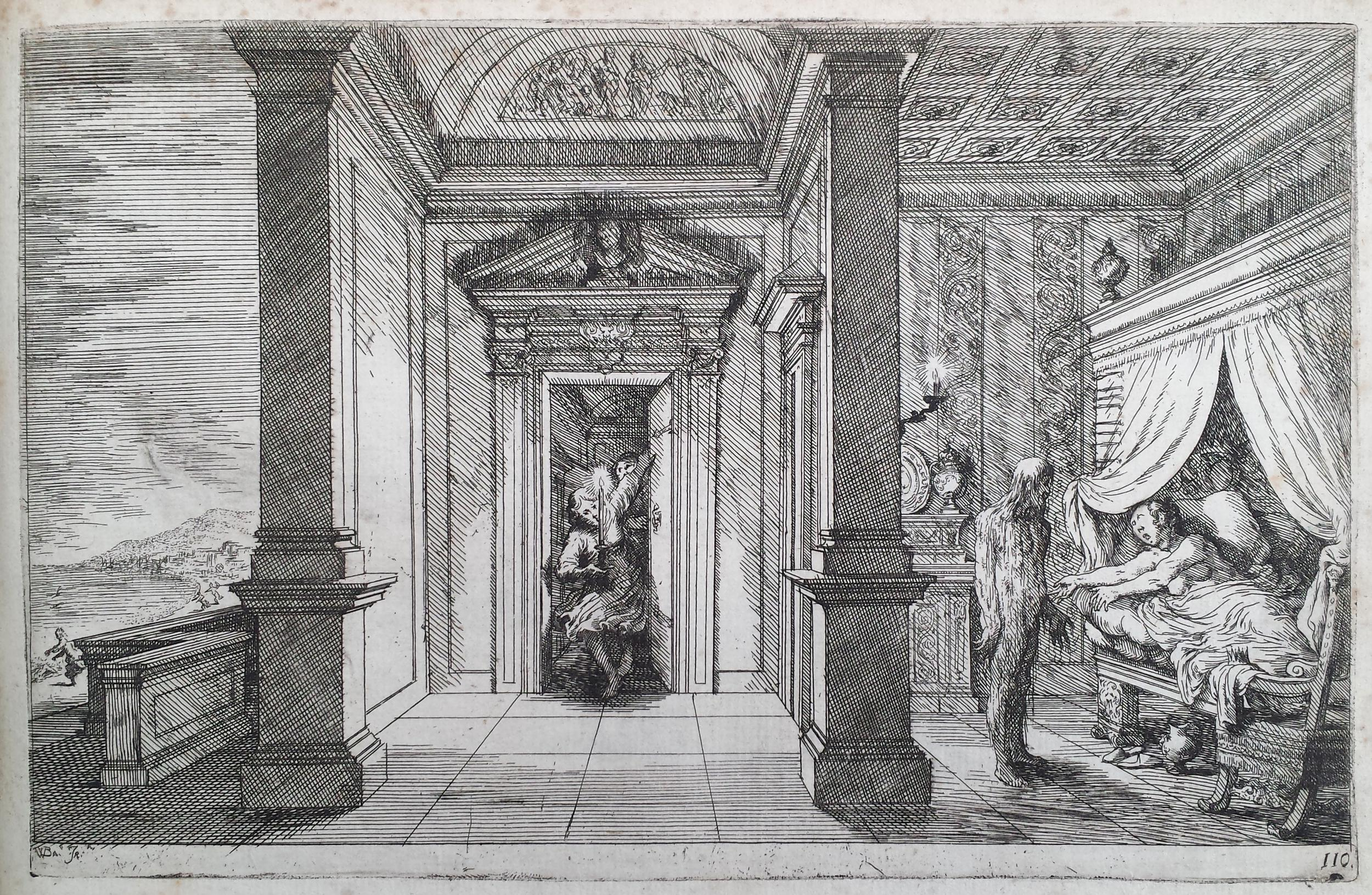
Morpheus appears to Alcyone. Engraving (or etching more likely) by Bauer for Ovid's Metamorphoses Book XI, 633–676.

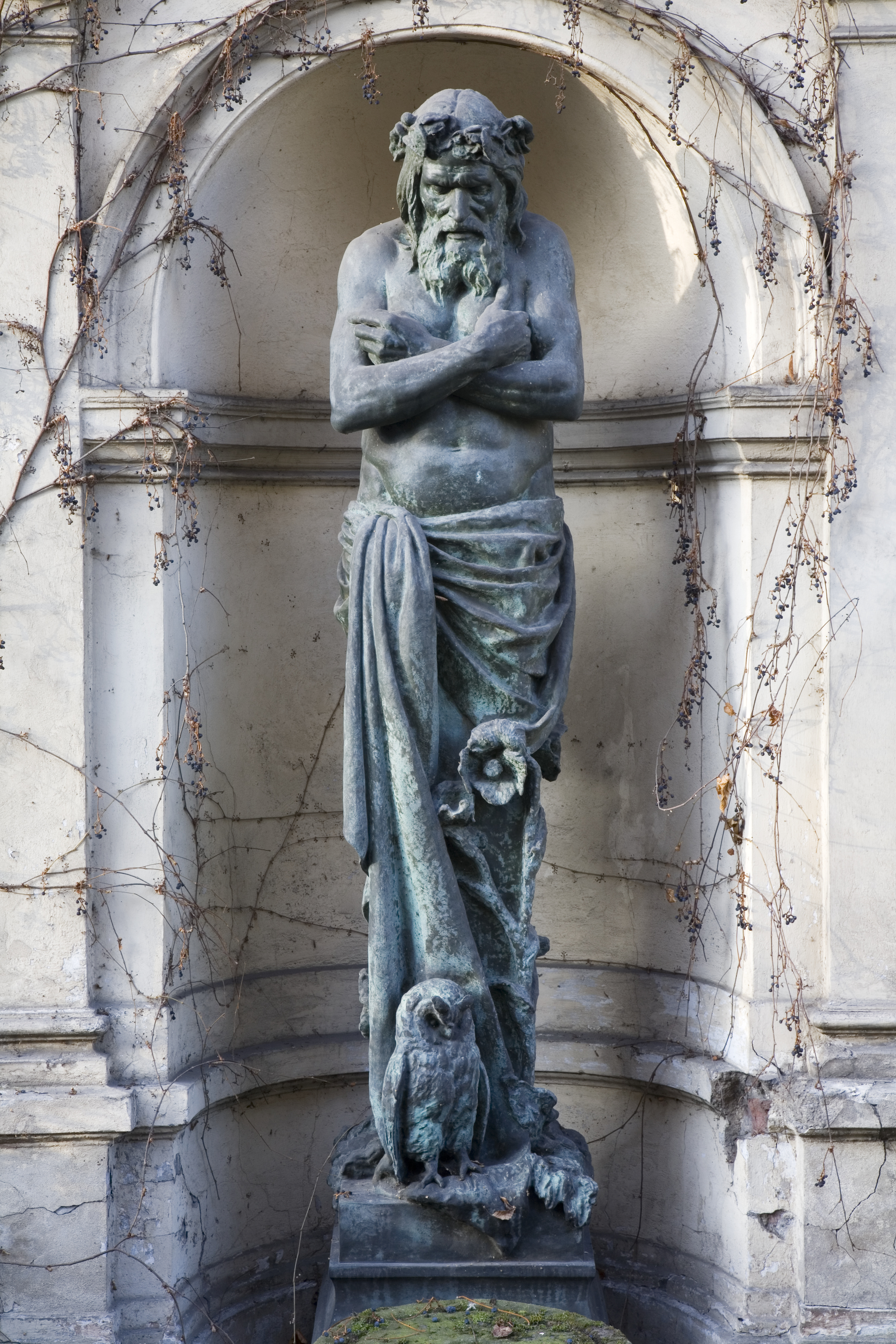
Morpheus. Sculpture by Teofila Certowicz (1889), National Museum in Kraków

== Namesake ==
- Friedrich Sertürner derived the name of the opiate drug morphine from the name of Morpheus.
- 4197 Morpheus, an Apollo asteroid and near-Earth object.

== See also ==
- Hypnos – Personification of sleep in Greek mythology
- Oneiroi – Personification of dreams in Greek mythology
- Dream (character) in DC comics sometimes referred to as Morpheus.
