= Greek underworld =

Location in Greek mythology

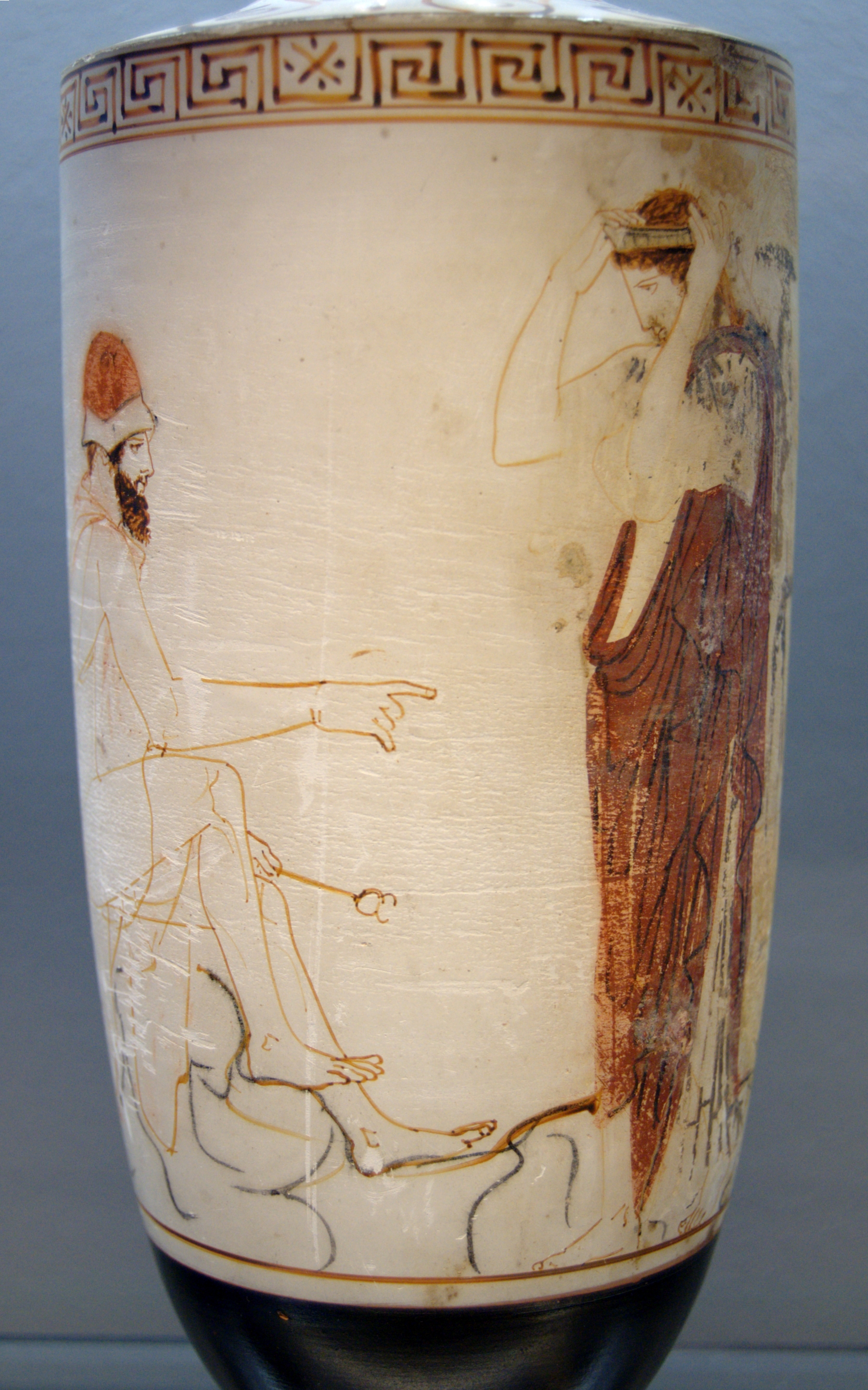
Hermes Psychopompos sits on a rock, preparing to lead a dead soul to the underworld. Attic white-ground lekythos, ca. 450 BC, Staatliche Antikensammlungen (Inv. 2797)

In Greek mythology, the underworld or Hades (Ancient Greek: ᾍδης, romanized: Háidēs) is a distinct realm (one of the three realms that make up the cosmos) where an individual goes after death. The earliest idea of afterlife in Greek myth is that, at the moment of death, an individual's essence (psyche) is separated from the corpse and transported to the underworld. In early mythology (e.g., Homer's Iliad and Odyssey) the dead were indiscriminately grouped together and led a shadowy post-existence; however, in later mythology (e.g., Platonic philosophy) elements of post-mortem judgment began to emerge with good and bad people being separated (both spatially and with regard to treatment).

The underworld itself—commonly referred to as Hades, after its patron god, but also known by various metonyms—is described as being located at the periphery of the earth, either associated with the outer limits of the ocean (i.e., Oceanus, again also a god) or beneath the earth. Darkness and a lack of sunlight are common features associated with the underworld and, in this way, provide a direct contrast to both the 'normality' of the land of the living (where the sun shines) and also with the brightness associated with Mount Olympus (the realm of the gods). The underworld is also considered to be an invisible realm, which is understood both in relation to the permanent state of darkness but also a potential etymological link with Hades as the 'unseen place'. The underworld is made solely for the dead and so mortals do not enter it – with only a few heroic exceptions (who undertook a mythical catabasis: Heracles, Theseus, Orpheus, possibly also Odysseus, and in later Roman depictions Aeneas).

== Geography ==
=== Entrance of the underworld ===
The deceased could enter the underworld through various routes, but perhaps the most common depiction is that of the ferryman Charon to take them across the river. This was a particularly common motif on Athenian white ground lekythoi (funerary vases) of fifth century BCE and it is difficult to date this figure much earlier than the 6th century BCE (perhaps the latest of Hades' inhabitants to 'appear'). While Charon doesn't feature in the earliest mythical sources, there was still a superstition that the unburied couldn't cross over until they receive a proper burial (the most famous examples being Patroclus and Hector in the Iliad). Alternatively, Hermes Psychopompos could also be relied upon to lead the deceased to the underworld and appears first in Homer's Odyssey book 24 (also a common motif on white ground lekythoi). Hades was well known for its gates (the πύλαι Ἀίδαο: Hom. Il. 5.646, 9.312, 23.71, Od. 14.156), with one of Hades's (the god) epithets being the "gate fastener" (πυλάρτης: Hom. Il. 8.367, 13.415, Od. 11.277).

=== Rivers ===
Rivers are a fundamental part of the topography of the underworld and are found in the earliest source materials: In Homer's Iliad, the "ghost" of Patroclus makes specific mention of gates and a river (unnamed) in Hades; in Homer's Odyssey, the "ghost" of Odysseus's mother, Anticlea, describes there being many "great rivers and appalling streams", and reference is made to at least four specific rivers. H. A. Guerber assumed that the rivers where Charon sailed mirrored the sky in Greco-Roman thought. In the wider mythological tradition, however, there are multiple bodies of water that are associated with the underworld (varying in number and combination depending on the source), the names of which can be understood to reflect specific associations with death.

- The Styx can be considered the most prominent and familiar of the underworld rivers. It is the only named underworld river mentioned in Homer's Iliad – the earliest mythological text concerning Hades – and three of the Homeric Hymns. Not only is it an underworld river but is also, more generally, the inviolable waters upon which the gods swear oaths and a goddess in her own right (the daughter of Oceanus and Tethys). In later traditions it often serves as the entrance to the underworld over which Charon (the ferryman of the dead) rows the deceased in order for them to enter the underworld. It is also known as the river of hatred. There are several Styx rivers in the real world: according to Herodotus, Strabo, and Pliny it was in Arcadia; while Pausanias locates one in Nonacris.
- The Acheron is the river of misery or river of woe. It is mentioned in many early sources of archaic poetry but is less prominent and early than the Styx. In some mythological accounts, Charon rows the dead over the Acheron rather than the Styx. In some alternative sources Acheron is a lake (rather than/as well as the river) and also functions as a synonym for the underworld. Pausanias describes a river named Acheron in Epirus, Thesprotia, which flows into a swampy-lake and converges with a river Cocytus (like its Homeric counterpart) which Pausanias attributes as the inspiration for Homer's description of the underworld. This site is also associated with specific instances of necromantic ritual and/or catabases from the mythic-past. Likewise, later traditions note an Acheron river in Cumae, Italy, which was also identified specifically with Odysseus' necromantic/catabatic activity.
- The Pyriphlegethon/Phlegethon is the river of blazing-fire (Pyriphlegéthōn being from the phrase puri phlegethonti, 'blazing like fire'). It has a single mention in Homer's Odyssey (Pyriphlegéthōn) where it is described as flowing into the river Acheron, and then does not appear again in sources until Plato. According to Plato, this river leads to the depths of Tartarus and is associated with punishment (in particular, people who hit their fathers and mothers). There was a river/field of this name near Cumae – maintaining its association with 'burning' due to the local hot springs – which Strabo explicitly associated with the Homeric underworld.
- The Cocytus is the river of wailing (from kōkuein, 'to weep, lament'). It too has only a single mention in Homer's Odyssey where it is described as a branch of the Styx that flows into the Acheron. According to Plato, the Cocytus is circular and empties into Tartarus and is associated with the punishment of murderers. It is also the name of a river in Thesprotia and Cumae which merges with the Acheron (see above).
- The Lethe is the river of forgetfulness, taking its name from Lethe, the goddess of forgetfulness and oblivion. In later accounts, a poplar branch dripping with water of the Lethe became the symbol of Hypnos, the god of sleep. Some sources reference a plain of Lethe, rather than a river.
- The Eridanos was mentioned as an underworld river by Virgil in his Aeneid.
- Oceanus is the river that encircles the world, and it marks the border of the land of the living and the underworld.

=== Asphodel Meadows ===
The Asphodel Meadows is the location in the underworld where the majority of the deceased dwell. The name appears as far back as Homer's Odyssey (11.539), where it features in Odysseus' survey of the underworld (technically referred to here as the field of asphodel: ἀσφοδελὸς λειμών). It is unclear exactly what the ancients understood this "field" to be, with scholars divided between either associating it with the flower asphodel (genus, Asphodelus L.) or with a field of ash (basing this on the etymological construction of σφοδελὸς > σποδός, "ash").

=== Elysium/Elysian Fields ===
The Elysium (also referred to as the Elysian Fields) was a utopian, paradisiacal afterlife reserved for specially distinguished individuals. The Elysian Fields are first referenced in Homer's Odyssey Book 4 where Menelaus is promised that he will go there instead of dying (and so distinguishing it from the afterlife proper): it is described as being located at the edges of the earth (the peirata) and is where life is "easiest for men". However, Menelaus does not achieve this fate due to anything he has done during his lifetime but rather because he is Zeus' son-in-law (being married to Helen). In Hesiod's Works and Days, however, this is a paradise that heroes could attain. Eventually, as concepts of the afterlife broadened and became more "democratic", the generally righteous could be sent to the Elysian Fields after being judged by the underworld judges, Rhadamanthus and Minos.

==== Isles of the Blessed ====
By Hesiod's time, the Elysium would also be known as the Fortunate Isles or the Isles of the Blessed. The isles, which were sometimes treated as a geographical location on Earth, would become known as a place of reward in the underworld for those who were judged exceptionally pure.

=== Erebus ===
Erebus is the personification of darkness, particularly that of the underworld. The name "Erebus" is often used by ancient authors to refer either to the underworld, or to the subterranean region through which souls of the dead travel to reach the underworld.

=== Tartarus ===
In some Greek sources Tartarus is another name for the underworld (serving as a metonym for Hades), while in others it is a completely distinct realm separate from the underworld. Hesiod most famously describes Tartarus as being as far beneath the underworld as the earth is beneath the sky. Like Hades, it too is so dark that the "night is poured around it in three rows like a collar round the neck, while above it grows the roots of the earth and of the unharvested sea." The most famous inhabitants of Tartarus are the Titans; Zeus cast the Titans along with his father Cronus into Tartarus after defeating them. Homer wrote that Cronus then became the king of Tartarus. According to Plato's Gorgias (c. 400 BC), souls are judged after death and Tartarus is where the wicked received divine punishment. Tartarus is also considered to be a primordial force or deity alongside entities such as the Earth, Night, and Time.

== Known inhabitants ==
=== Hades ===
Hades (Aides, Aidoneus, or Haidês), the eldest son of the Titans Cronus and Rhea; brother of Zeus, Poseidon, Hera, Demeter, and Hestia, is the Greek god of the underworld. When the three brothers divided the world between themselves, Zeus received the heavens, Poseidon the sea, and Hades the underworld; the earth itself was divided between the three. Therefore, while Hades' responsibility was in the underworld, he was allowed to have power on earth as well. However, Hades himself is rarely seen outside his domain, and to those on earth his intentions and personality are a mystery. In art and literature Hades is depicted as stern and dignified, but not as a fierce torturer or devil-like. However, Hades was considered the enemy to all life and was hated by both the gods and men; sacrifices and prayers did not appease him so mortals rarely tried. He was also not a tormenter of the dead, and sometimes considered the "Zeus of the dead" because he was hospitable to them. Due to his role as lord of the underworld and ruler of the dead, he was also known as Zeus Khthonios ("the infernal Zeus" or "Zeus of the lower world"). Those who received punishment in Tartarus were assigned by the other gods seeking vengeance. In Greek society, many viewed Hades as the least liked god and many gods even had an aversion towards him, and when people would sacrifice to Hades, it would be if they wanted revenge on an enemy or something terrible to happen to them.

Hades was sometimes referred to as Pluton and was represented in a lighter way – here, he was considered the giver of wealth, since the crops and the blessing of the harvest come from below the earth.

=== Persephone ===
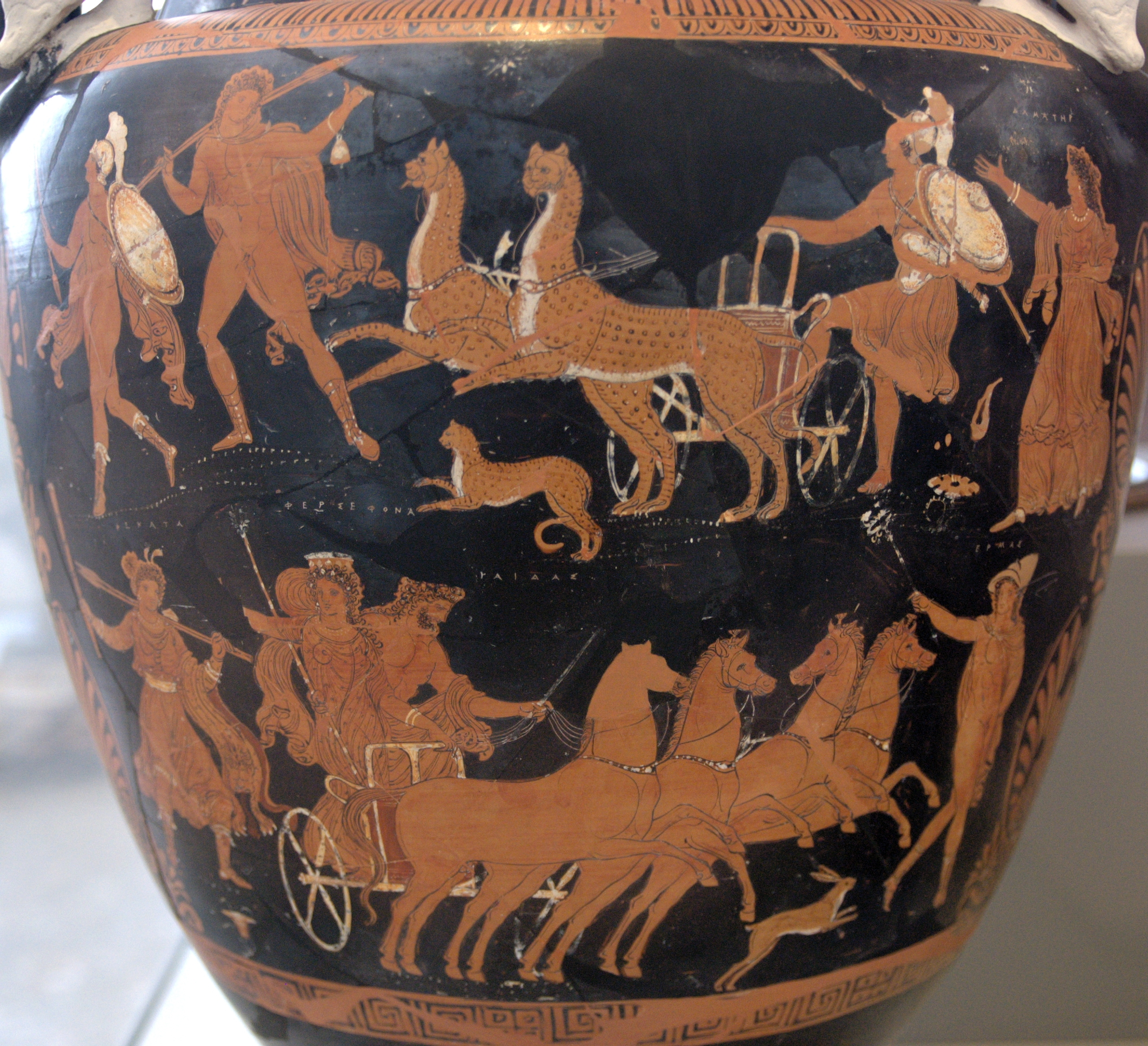
The Rape of Persephone: Persephone is abducted by Hades in his chariot. Persephone krater Antikensammlung Berlin 1984.40

Persephone (also known as Kore) was the daughter of Demeter, the goddess of the harvest, and Zeus. Persephone was abducted by Hades, who desired a wife. When Persephone was gathering flowers, she was entranced by a narcissus flower planted by Gaia (to lure her to the underworld as a favor to Hades), and when she picked it the earth suddenly opened up. Hades, appearing in a golden chariot, abducted Persephone into the underworld. When Demeter found out that Zeus had given Persephone to Hades, Demeter became consumed by grief and enraged at Zeus, so she stopped growing harvests for the earth. To soothe her, Zeus sent Hermes to the underworld to allow Persephone to leave the underworld. However, Hades had made her eat six pomegranate seeds in the underworld and was thus eternally tied to the underworld.

Persephone could then only leave the underworld when the earth was blooming, or every season except the winter. The Homeric Hymns describes the abduction of Persephone by Hades:

I sing now of the great Demeter
Of the beautiful hair,
And of her daughter Persephone
Of the lovely feet,
Whom Zeus let Hades tear away
From her mother's harvests
And friends and flowers—
Especially the Narcissus,
Grown by Gaia to entice the girl
As a favor to Hades, the gloomy one.
This was the flower that
Left all amazed,
Whose hundred buds made
The sky itself smile.
When the maiden reached out
To pluck such beauty,
The earth opened up
And out burst Hades ...
The son of Kronos,
Who took her by force
On his chariot of gold,
To the place where so many
Long not to go.
Persephone screamed,
She called to her father,
All-powerful and high, ...
But Zeus had allowed this.
He sat in a temple
Hearing nothing at all,
Receiving the sacrifices of
Supplicating men.

=== Hecate ===
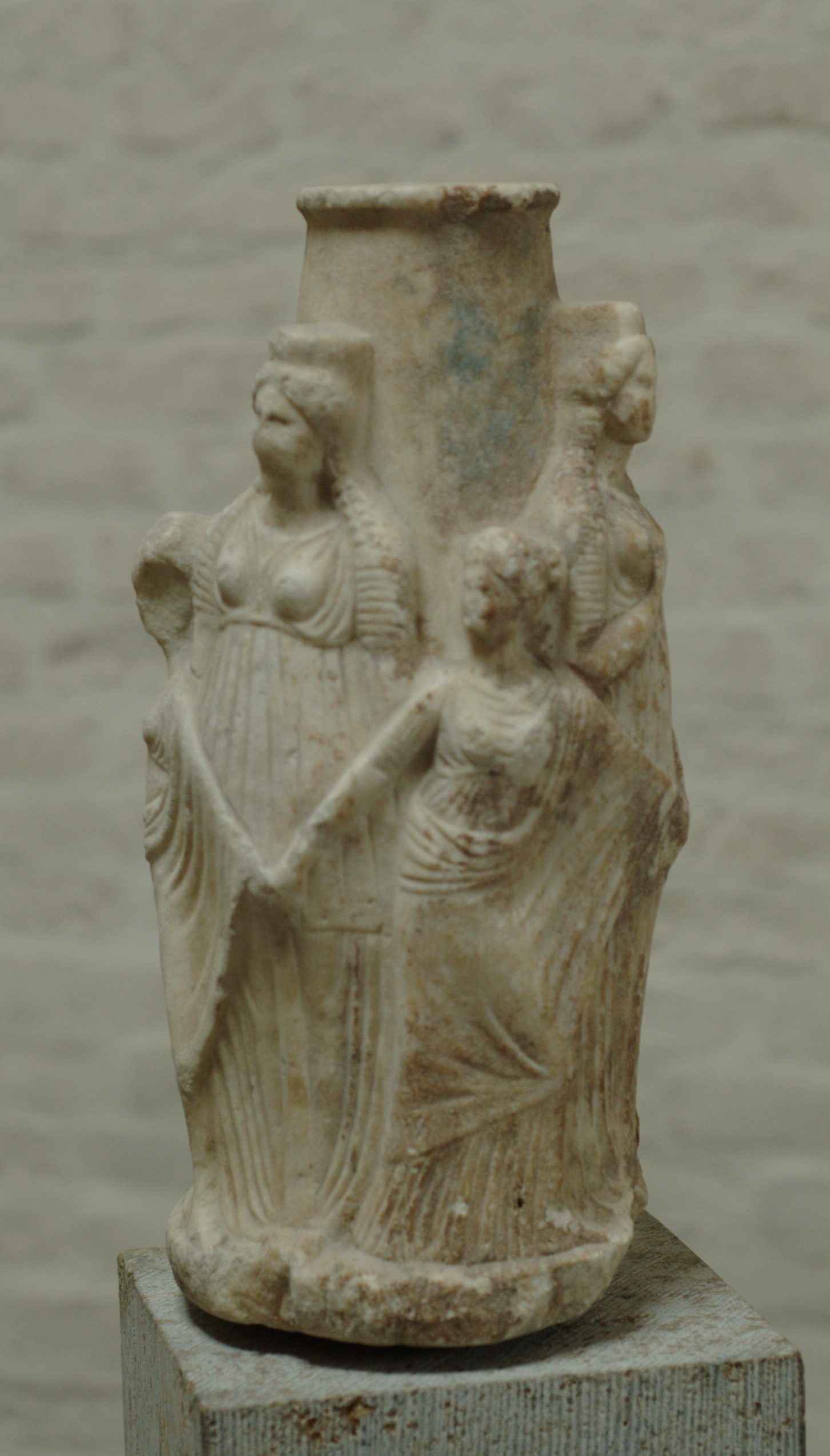
Triple Hecate and the Charites, Attic, 3rd century BCE (Glyptothek, Munich)

Hecate was variously associated with crossroads, entrance-ways, dogs, light, the Moon, magic, witchcraft, knowledge of herbs and poisonous plants, necromancy, and sorcery. Hecate is often shown as a tripartite goddess, which allows her to look in multiple directions at once. This emphasizes her role as a protector of the in betweens.

=== The Erinyes ===
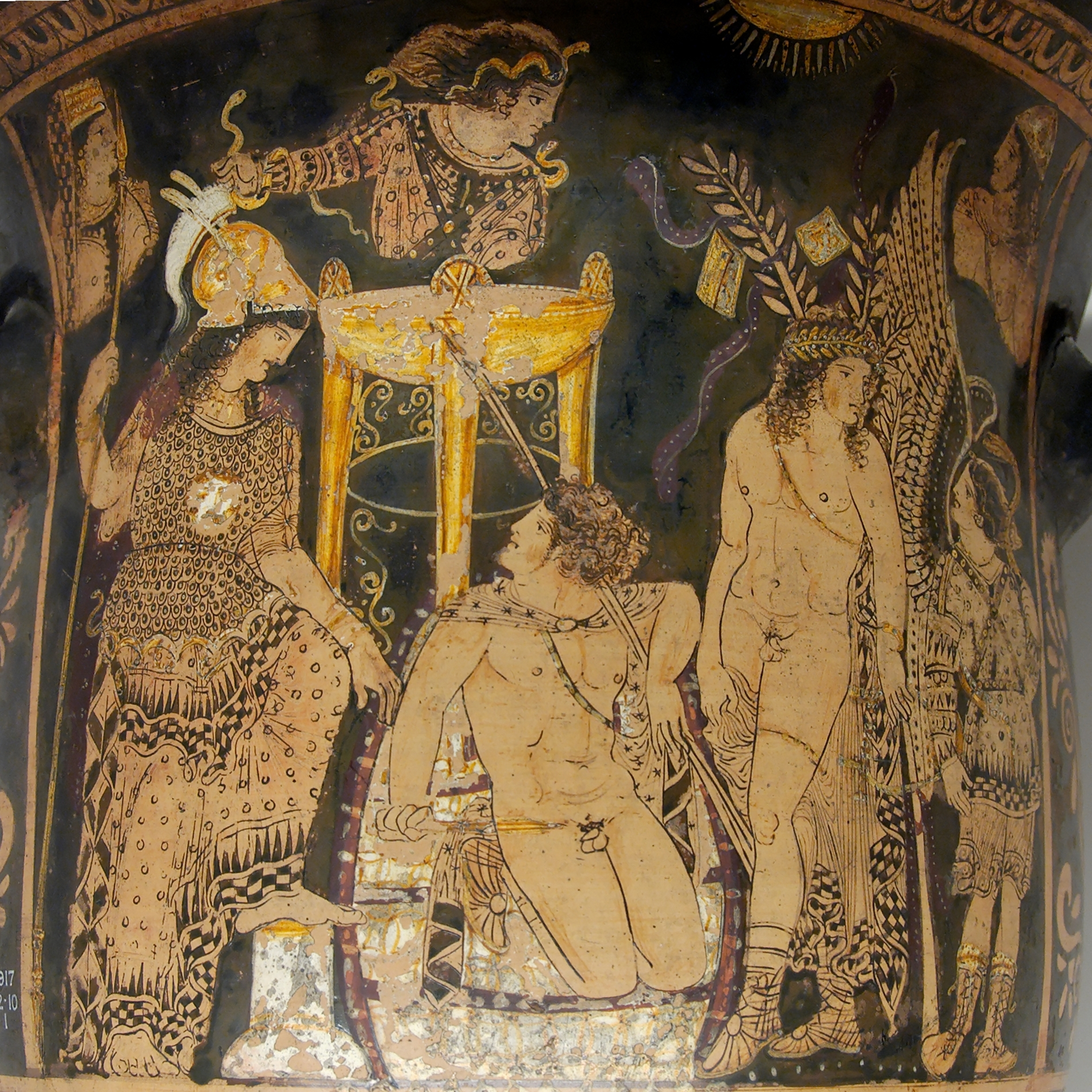
Orestes at Delphi flanked by Athena and Pylades among the Erinyes and priestesses of the oracle, perhaps including Pythia behind the tripod – Paestan red-figured bell-krater, c. 330 BC

The Erinyes (also known as the Furies) were the three goddesses associated with the souls of the dead and the avenged crimes against the natural order of the world. They consist of Alecto, Megaera, and Tisiphone.

They were particularly concerned with crimes done by children against their parents such as matricide, patricide, and unfilial conduct. They would inflict madness upon the living murderer, or if a nation was harboring such a criminal, the Erinyes would cause starvation and disease to the nation. The Erinyes were dreaded by the living since they embodied the vengeance of the person who was wronged against the wrongdoer. Often the Greeks made "soothing libations" to the Erinyes to appease them so as to not invoke their wrath, and overall the Erinyes received many more libations and sacrifices than other gods of the underworld. The Erinyes were depicted as ugly and winged women with their bodies intertwined with serpents.

=== Hermes ===
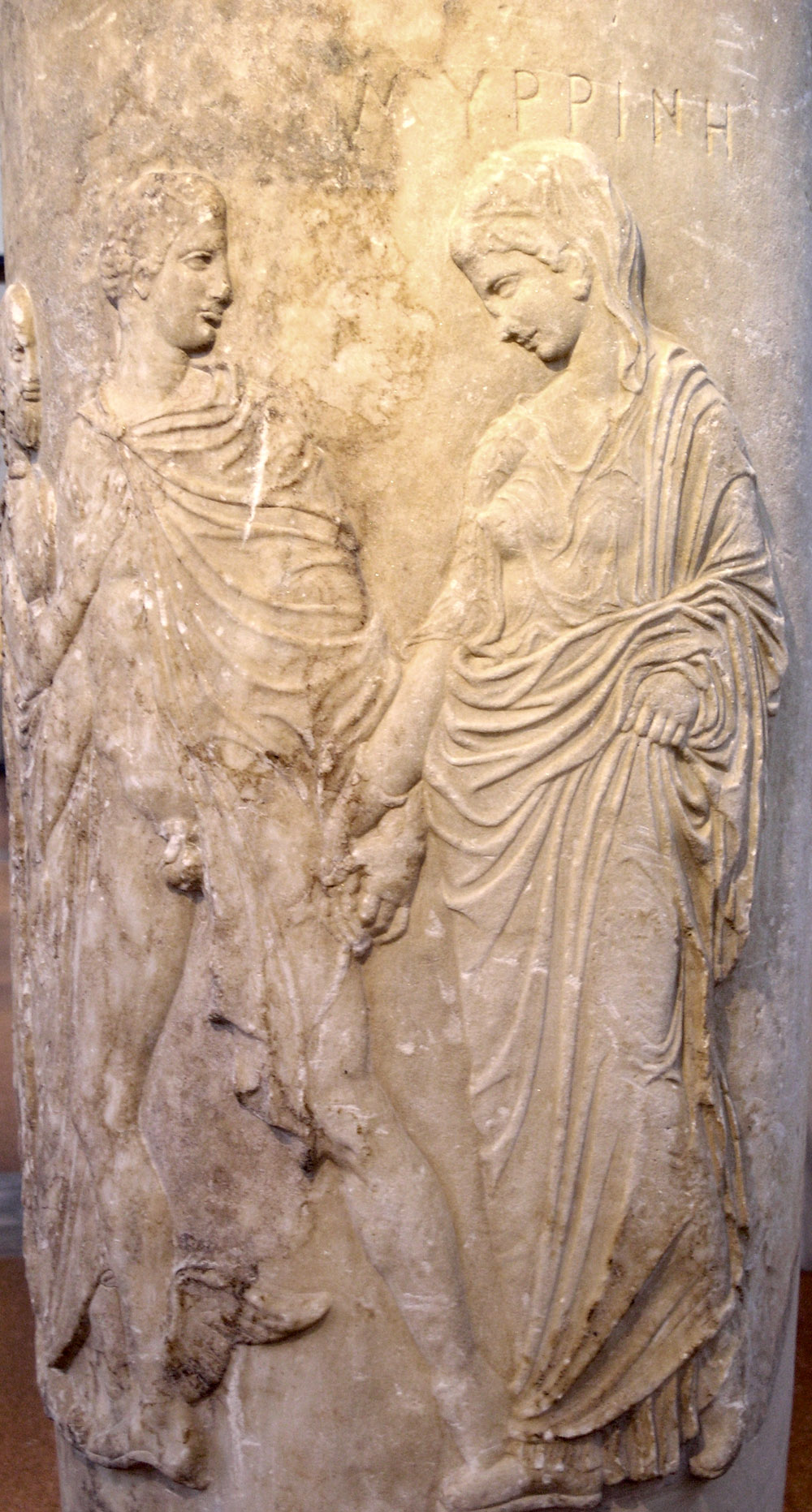
Relief from a carved funerary lekythos at Athens: Hermes as psychopomp conducts the deceased, Myrrhine, to Hades, ca 430-420 BCE (National Archaeological Museum of Athens).

While Hermes did not primarily reside in the underworld and is not usually associated with the underworld, he was the one who led the souls of the dead to the underworld. In this sense, he was known as Hermes Psychopompos and with his fair golden wand he was able to lead the dead to their new home. He was also called upon by the dying to assist in their death – some called upon him to have painless deaths or be able to die when and where they believed they were meant to die.

=== Judges of the underworld ===
Minos, Rhadamanthus, and Aeacus are the judges of the dead. Plato also includes Triptolemus. They judged the deeds of the deceased and created the laws that governed the underworld.

Aeacus was the guardian of the Keys of the underworld and the judge of the men of Europe. Rhadamanthus was Lord of Elysium and judge of the men of Asia. Minos was the judge of the final vote.

=== Charon ===
Charon is the ferryman who, after receiving a soul from Hermes, would guide them across the rivers Styx and/or Acheron to the underworld. At funerals, the deceased traditionally had an obol placed over their eye or under their tongue, so they could pay Charon to take them across. If not, they were said to fly at the shores for one hundred years, until they were allowed to cross the river. To the Etruscans, Charon was considered a fearsome being – he wielded a hammer and was hook-nosed, bearded, and had animalistic ears with teeth. In other early Greek depictions, Charon was considered merely an ugly bearded man with a conical hat and tunic. Later on, in more modern Greek folklore, he was considered more angelic, like the Archangel Michael. Nevertheless, Charon was considered a terrifying being since his duty was to bring these souls to the underworld and no one would persuade him to do otherwise.

=== Cerberus ===
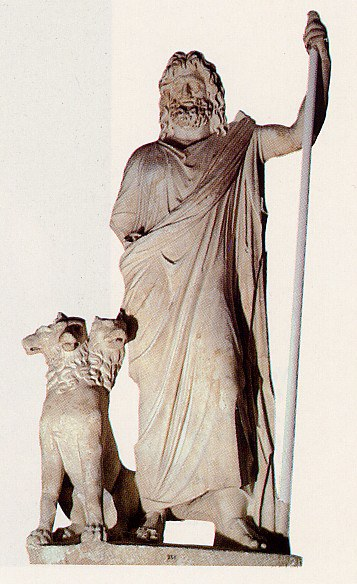
Serapis with Cerberus.

Cerberus (Kerberos), or the "Hell-Hound", is Hades' massive multi-headed (usually three-headed) dog with some descriptions stating that it also has a snake-headed tail and snake heads on its back and as its mane. Born from Echidna and Typhon, Cerberus guards the gate that serves as the entrance of the underworld. Cerberus' duty is to prevent dead people from leaving the underworld.

Heracles once borrowed Cerberus as the final part of the Labours of Heracles. Orpheus once soothed it to sleep with his music.

According to the Suda, the ancient Greeks placed a honeycake (μελιτοῦττα) with the dead in order for the dead to give it to Cerberus.

=== Thanatos ===
Thanatos is the personification of death. Specifically, he represented non-violent death as contrasted with his sisters the Keres, the spirits of diseases and slaughter.

=== Hypnos ===
Hypnos is the personification of sleep and twin brother of Thanatos. His cave was described as impenetrable by the light of sun and moon alike; it was surrounded by poppies and other soporific plants. The river Lethe also flowed through the cave, and here its murmuring would induce drowsiness.

=== Melinoë ===
Melinoe is a chthonic nymph, daughter of Zeus and Persephone, invoked in one of the Orphic Hymns and propitiated as a bringer of nightmares and madness. She may also be the figure named in a few inscriptions from Anatolia, and she appears on a bronze tablet in association with Persephone. The hymns, of uncertain date but probably composed in the 2nd or 3rd century AD, are liturgical texts for the mystery religion known as Orphism. In the hymn, Melinoë has characteristics that seem similar to Hecate and the Erinyes, and the name is sometimes thought to be an epithet of Hecate. The terms in which Melinoë is described are typical of moon goddesses in Greek poetry.

=== Nyx ===
Nyx is the goddess of the Night and the daughter of Chaos.

=== Tartarus ===
A deep abyss used as a dungeon of torment and suffering for the wicked and as the prison for the Titans, Tartarus was also considered to be a primordial deity.

=== Styx ===
Styx is the goddess of the river with the same name. Not much is known about her, but she is an ally of Zeus and lives in the underworld.

=== Eurynomos ===
Eurynomos is one of the daemons of the underworld, who eats off all the flesh of the corpses, leaving only their bones.

=== Zagreus ===
Zagreus was considered by some ancient authors as an underworld god.

== The dead ==
In the Greek underworld, the souls of the dead (known as shades) still existed, but they were insubstantial and flitted around the underworld with no sense of purpose. The dead within the Homeric underworld lack menos, or strength, and therefore they cannot influence those on earth. They also lack phrenes, or wit, and are heedless of what goes on around them and the earth above them. Their lives in the underworld were very neutral, so all social statuses and political positions were eliminated, and no one was able to use their previous lives to their advantage in the underworld.

The idea of progress did not exist in the Greek underworld—at the moment of death, the psyche was frozen in experience and appearance. The souls in the underworld did not age or really change in any sense. They did not lead any active life in the underworld—they were exactly the same as in life. Therefore, those who had died in battle were eternally blood-spattered in the underworld, and those who had died peacefully were able to remain that way.

Overall, the Greek dead were considered irritable and unpleasant but not dangerous or malevolent. They grew angry if they felt a hostile presence near their graves, and drink offerings were given in order to appease them so as not to anger the dead. Mostly, blood offerings were given because they needed the essence of life to become communicative and conscious again. This is shown in Homer's Odyssey, where Odysseus had to offer the blood of sheep in order for the souls to interact with him. While in the underworld, the dead passed the time through simple pastimes such as playing games, as shown by objects found in tombs such as dice and game-boards. Grave gifts such as clothing, jewelry, and food were left by the living for use in the underworld as well since many viewed these gifts to carry over into the underworld. There was not a general consensus as to whether the dead could consume food. Homer depicted the dead as unable to eat or drink unless summoned; however, some reliefs portray the underworld as having many elaborate feasts. While not completely clear, it is implied that the dead could still have sexual intimacy with another, although no children were produced. The Greeks also believed in the possibility of marriage in the underworld, which, in a sense, implies the Greek underworld was little different from the world of the living.

Lucian described the people of the underworld as simple skeletons. They are indistinguishable from each other, and it is impossible to tell who was wealthy or important in the living world. However, this view of the underworld was not universal—Homer depicts the dead keeping their familiar faces.

Hades itself was free from the concept of time. The dead are aware of both the past and the future, and in poems describing Greek heroes, the dead helped move the story's plot by prophesying and telling truths unknown to the hero. The only way for humans to communicate with the dead was to suspend time and their everyday life to reach Hades, the place beyond immediate perception and human time.

== Greek attitudes ==
The Greeks had a definite belief that there was a journey to the afterlife or another world. They believed that death was not a complete end to life or human existence. The Greeks hypothesized a soul after death, but saw the afterlife as meaningless. In the underworld, the identity of a dead person still existed, but it had no strength or true influence. Rather, the continuation of the existence of the soul in the underworld was considered a remembrance of the fact that the dead person had existed, yet while the soul still existed, it was inactive. However, the price of death was considered a great one. Homer believed that the best possible existence for humans was to never be born at all, or die soon after birth, because the greatness of life could never balance the price of death. However, it was considered very important to the Greeks to honor the dead and was seen as a type of piety. Those who did not respect the dead opened themselves to the punishment of the gods – for example, Odysseus ensured Ajax's burial, or the gods would be angered.

== Myths and stories ==
=== Orpheus ===
Orpheus, a poet and musician that had almost supernatural abilities to move anyone to his music, descended to the underworld as a living mortal to retrieve his dead wife Eurydice after she was bitten by a poisonous snake on their wedding day. With his lyre-playing skills, he was able to put a spell on the guardians of the underworld and move them with his music. With his beautiful voice he was able to convince Hades and Persephone to allow him and his wife to return to the living. The rulers of the underworld agreed, but under one condition – Eurydice would have to follow behind Orpheus and he could not turn around to look at her. Once Orpheus reached the entrance, he turned around, longing to look at his beautiful wife, only to watch as his wife faded back into the underworld. He was forbidden to return to the underworld a second time and he spent his life playing his music to the birds and the mountains.

== See also ==
- Metempsychosis – Transmigration of the soul
- Katabasis – Journey into the underworld in literature
- Nekyia – Ancient Greek cult practice
- Upper World (Greek mythology) – Location in Greek mythology
- Hades in Christianity

== Bibliography ==
- Albinus, Lars (2000). The House of Hades: Studies in Ancient Greek Eschatology. Aarhus: Aarhus University Press.
- Bärsch, Dominic (2023). Mundus ecce nutat et labitur: Weltuntergangskonzepte in der griechischen und lateinischen Literatur. Göttingen: Vandenhoeck & Ruprecht. ISBN 9783525302217.
- Buxton, R. (2004). The complete World of Greek Mythology. London: Thames & Hudson Ltd. ISBN 9780500251218.
- Fairbanks, Arthur (1900). "The Chthonic Gods of Greek Religion". The American Journal of Philology. 21 (3). The Johns Hopkins University Press: 241–259. doi:10.2307/287716. JSTOR 287716.
- Garland, Robert (1985). The Greek Way of Death. London: Duckworth.
- Hard, Robin, The Routledge Handbook of Greek Mythology: Based on H.J. Rose's "Handbook of Greek Mythology", London and New York, Routledge, 2004. ISBN 020344633X. doi:10.4324/9780203446331.
- Leeming, David (2005). "Demeter and Persephone". The Oxford Companion to World Mythology. Oxford University Press. doi:10.1093/acref/9780195156690.001.0001. ISBN 9780195156690.
- Leeming, David (2005). "Styx". The Oxford Companion to World Mythology. Oxford University Press. doi:10.1093/acref/9780195156690.001.0001. ISBN 9780195156690.
- Liddell, Henry George, and Robert Scott, A Greek-English Lexicon, revised by Henry Stuart Jones, Oxford, Clarendon Press, 1940. Perseus Digital Library.
- Long, J. Bruce (2005). "Underworld". Encyclopedia of Religion. 14. Macmillan Reference USA: 9451–9458.
- Mirtro, Marina Serena (2012). Death in the Greek world : from Homer to the classical age. Norman: University of Oklahoma Press.
- Mikalson, Jon D. (2010). Ancient Greek Religion. West Sussex: Wiley-Blackwell.
- Morford, Mark, Robert J. Lenardon, and Michael Sham, Classical Mythology, Oxford and New York, Oxford University Press, 2018. ISBN 9780195308051. Internet Archive.
- Mystakidou, Kyriaki; Tsilika, Eleni; Parpa, Efi; Katsouda, Elena; Vlahous, Lambros (2004–2005). "Death and Grief in the Greek Culture". Omega. 50 (1). Baywood Publishing Co.: 23–34. doi:10.2190/yyau-r4mn-akkm-t496. S2CID 144183546.
- O'Cleirigh, Padraig; Barrell, Rex A.; Bell, John M. (2000). An introduction to Greek mythology : story, symbols, and culture. Lewiston, New York: Edwin Mellen Press.
- Peck, Harry Thurston (1897). Harper's Dictionary of Classical Literature and Antiquities. Harper.
- Pfister, F. (1961). Greek Gods and Heroes. London: Macgibbon & Kee.
- Scarfuto, Christine. "The Greek Underworld".
- Schmiel, Robert (1987). "Achilles in Hades". Classical Philology. 82 (1). The University of Chicago Press: 35–37. doi:10.1086/367020. JSTOR 270025. S2CID 161299069.
- Smith, William, Dictionary of Greek and Roman Biography and Mythology, London, John Murray, 1873. OCLC 681106410. Perseus Digital Library.
