= Phobetor =

Greek god of sleep and dreams

In Ovid's Metamorphoses, Phobetor (Ancient Greek: Φοβήτωρ, romanized: Phobḗtōr, lit. 'frightener', from Ancient Greek: φόβος, romanized: phóbos, lit. 'panic, fear'), so called by humans, or Icelus/Icelos (Ancient Greek: Ἴκελος, romanized: Íkelos, lit. 'like, resembling'), so called by the gods, is one of the thousand sons of Hypnos (known to the Romans as Somnus). He appeared in dreams "in the form of beast or bird or the long serpent".

According to Ovid, two of his brothers were Morpheus, who appeared in dreams in human form, and Phantasos ('Fantasy'), who appears in dreams in the form of inanimate objects. The three brothers‘ names are found nowhere earlier than Ovid, which leads some scholars to believe that they were originally invented by him. One example of these scholars is Tripp, who calls the three figures "literary, not mythical concepts". However, there is not a consensus around the origins of the figures. For example, Griffin suggests that the names of the deities and the division of dream forms between Phobetor and his brothers may have been of Hellenistic origin.

== See also ==
- Epiales
- Melinoë
- Phobos (mythology)
