= Phantasos =

Son of Somnus according to Ovid

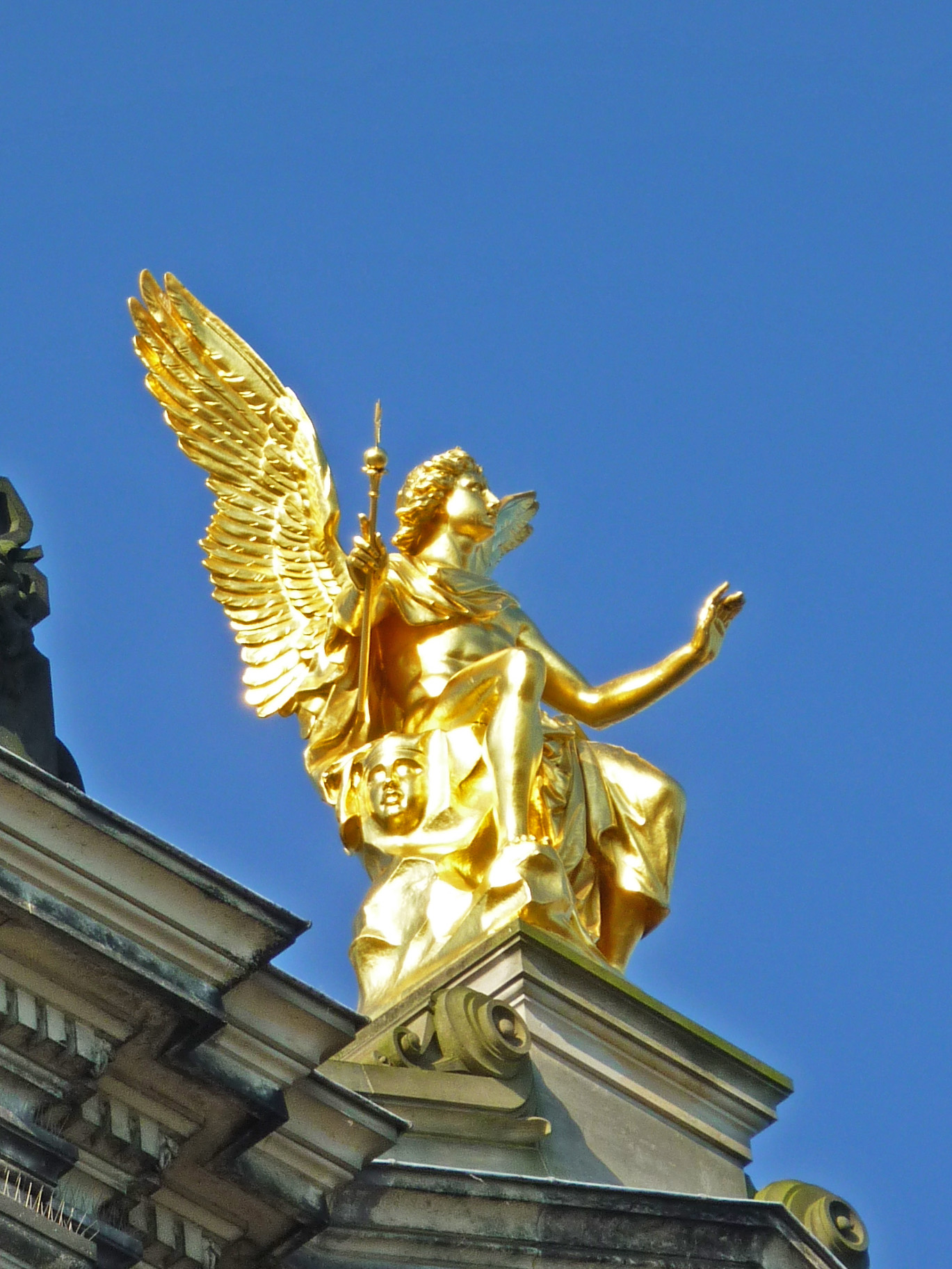
Phantasos on the western corner of the Dresden Academy of Fine Arts by Robert Henze

In Ovid's Metamorphoses, Phantasos (Ancient Greek: Φάντασος, 'apparition' 'fantasy' from Ancient Greek: φαντασία, phantasíā, 'appearance' 'imagination') is one of the thousand sons of Somnus (Sleep, the Roman counterpart of Hypnos). He appeared in dreams in the form of inanimate objects, putting on "deceptive shapes of earth, rocks, water, trees, all lifeless things".

== Ovid ==
According to Ovid, two of his brothers were Morpheus, who appeared in dreams in human form, and one called Icelos ('Like'), by the gods, but Phobetor ('Frightener') by men, who appeared in dreams in the form of beasts. The three brothers' names are found nowhere earlier than Ovid, and are perhaps Ovidian inventions. Tripp calls these three figures "literary, not mythical concepts". However, Griffin suggests that this division of dream forms between Phantasos and his brothers, possibly including their names, may have been of Hellenistic origin.
