= Upper world (Greek mythology) =

Location in Greek mythology

In Greek mythology, the upper world is the part of the world inhabited by the living. Below it lies the underworld.
