= Mors (mythology) =

Personification of death in Roman mythology

- Personification of Death
- Parents: Nox and Scotus

In ancient Roman myth and literature, Mors is the personification of death equivalent to the Greek Thanatos. The Latin noun for "death," mors, genitive mortis, is of feminine gender, but surviving ancient Roman art is not known to depict death as a woman. Latin poets, however, are bound by the grammatical gender of the word. Horace writes of pallida Mors, "pale Death," who kicks her way into the hovels of the poor and the towers of kings equally. Seneca, for whom Mors is also pale, describes her "eager teeth." Tibullus pictures Mors as black or dark.

Mors is often represented allegorically in later Western literature and art, particularly during the Middle Ages. Depictions of the Crucifixion of Christ sometimes show Mors standing at the foot of the cross. Mors' antithesis is personified as Vita, "Life."

== Roman mythology ==
In Latin literature, Mors is sometimes identified with the Roman gods Mars, god of war; Dīs Pater, god of the Roman underworld (later, also known as Pluto) and Orcus, god of death and punisher of perjurers.

== See also ==
- List of death deities
- Parca Maurtia or Morta, one of the Parcae
- Pluto
