= Thanatos =

Ancient Greek personification of death

- Personification of Death
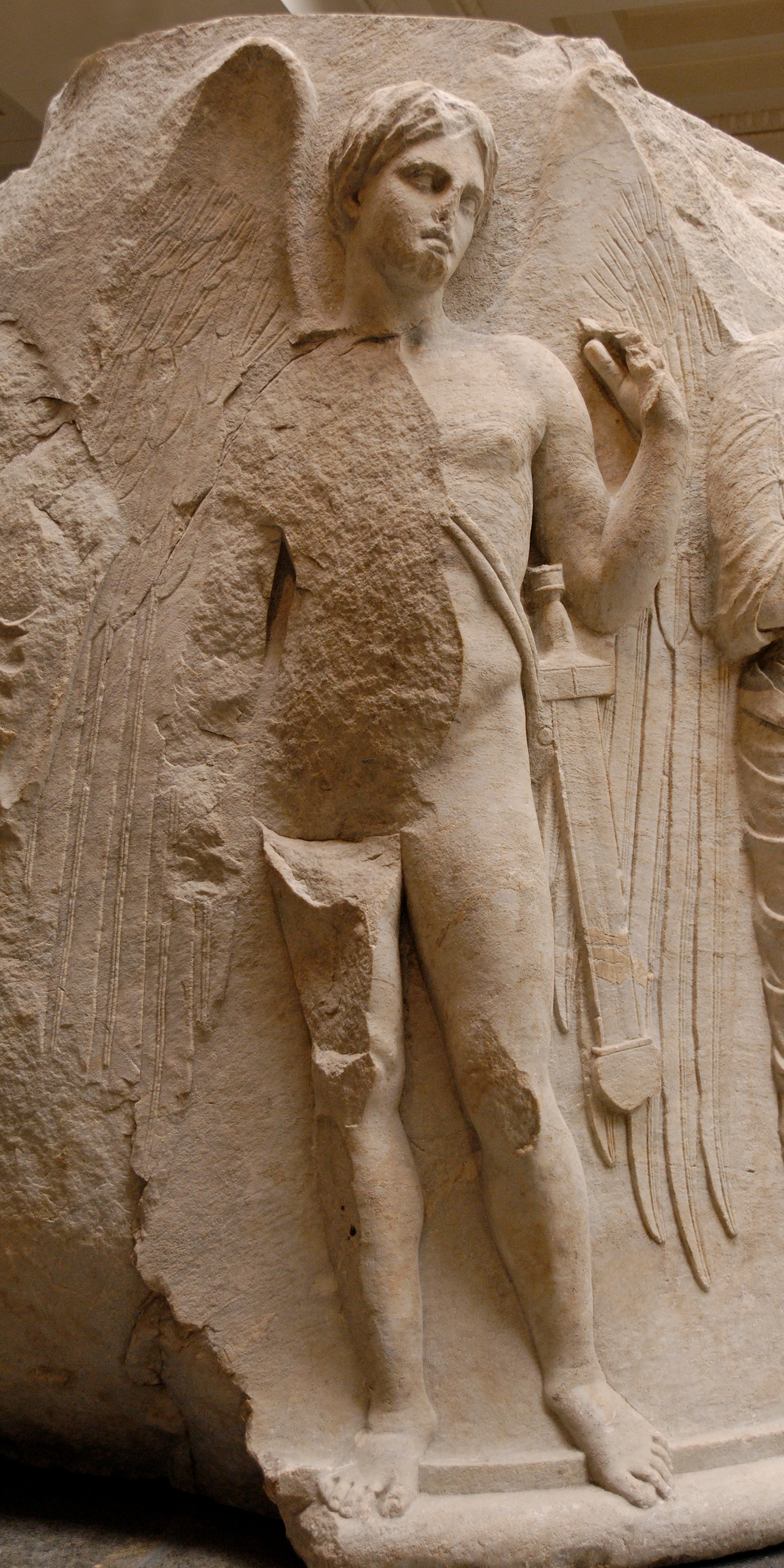
- Thanatos as a winged and sword-girt youth. Sculptured marble column drum from the Temple of Artemis at Ephesos, c. 325–300 BC.
- Abode: Underworld
- Symbol: Theta, Poppy, Butterfly, Sword, Inverted Torch
- Parents: Nyx alone

In Greek mythology, Thanatos (UK: /ˈθænətɒs/; Ancient Greek: Θάνατος, Thánatos, pronounced in Ancient Greek: [tʰánatos] "Death", from θνῄσκω thnēskō "(I) die, am dying") was the personification of death. He was a figure in Greek mythology, often referred to but rarely appearing in person.

His name is transliterated in Latin as Thanatus, but his counterpart in Roman mythology is Mors or Letum.

== In myth and poetry ==
The Greek poet Hesiod established in his Theogony that Thánatos has no father, but is the son of Nyx (Night) and brother of Hypnos (Sleep).

Homer earlier described Hypnos and Thanatos as twin brothers in his epic poem, the Iliad, where they were charged by Zeus via Apollo with the swift delivery of the slain hero Sarpedon to his homeland of Lycia.

Then [Apollo] gave him (Sarpedon) into the charge of swift messengers to carry him, of Hypnos and Thanatos, who are twin brothers, and these two presently laid him down within the rich countryside of broad Lycia.

Counted among Thanatos' siblings were other personifications such as Geras (Old Age), Oizys (Suffering), Moros (Doom), Apate (Deception), Momus (Blame), Eris (Strife), and Nemesis (Retribution). Thanatos was loosely associated with the three Moirai (for Hesiod, also daughters of Night), particularly Atropos, who was a goddess of death in her own right. He is also, at times, specified as being exclusive to a peaceful death, while the bloodthirsty Keres embodied violent death. His duties as a Guide of the Dead were sometimes superseded by Hermes Psychopompos.

The god's character is established by Hesiod in the following passage of the Theogony:

And there the children of dark Night have their dwellings, Sleep and Death, awful gods. The glowing Sun never looks upon them with his beams, neither as he goes up into heaven, nor as he comes down from heaven. And the former of them roam peacefully over the earth and the sea's broad back and is kindly to men; but the other has a heart of iron, and his spirit within him is pitiless as bronze: whomsoever of men he has once seized he holds fast: and he is hateful even to the deathless gods.

Thanatos was thus regarded as merciless and indiscriminate, hated by – and hateful towards — mortals and gods alike. But in myths which feature him, Thanatos could occasionally be outwitted, a feat that the sly King Sisyphus of Korinth twice accomplished. When it came time for Sisyphus to die, Zeus ordered Thanatos to chain Sisyphus up in Tartarus. Sisyphus cheated death by tricking Thanatos into his own shackles, thereby preventing the demise of any mortal while Thanatos was so enchained.

Eventually Ares, the bloodthirsty god of war, grew frustrated with the battles he incited, since neither side could suffer any casualties. He released Thanatos and handed his captor over to the god. Sisyphus would evade Death a second time by convincing Persephone to allow him to return to his wife stating that she never gave him a proper funeral. This time, Sisyphus was forcefully dragged back to the Underworld by Hermes, where he was sentenced to an eternity of frustration in Tartarus, rolling a boulder up a hill only to have it roll back down when he got close to the top.

A fragment of Alcaeus, a Greek lyric poet of the 6th century BC, refers to this episode:

King Sisyphos, son of Aiolos, wisest of men, supposed that he was master of Thanatos; but despite his cunning he crossed eddying Akheron twice at fate's command.

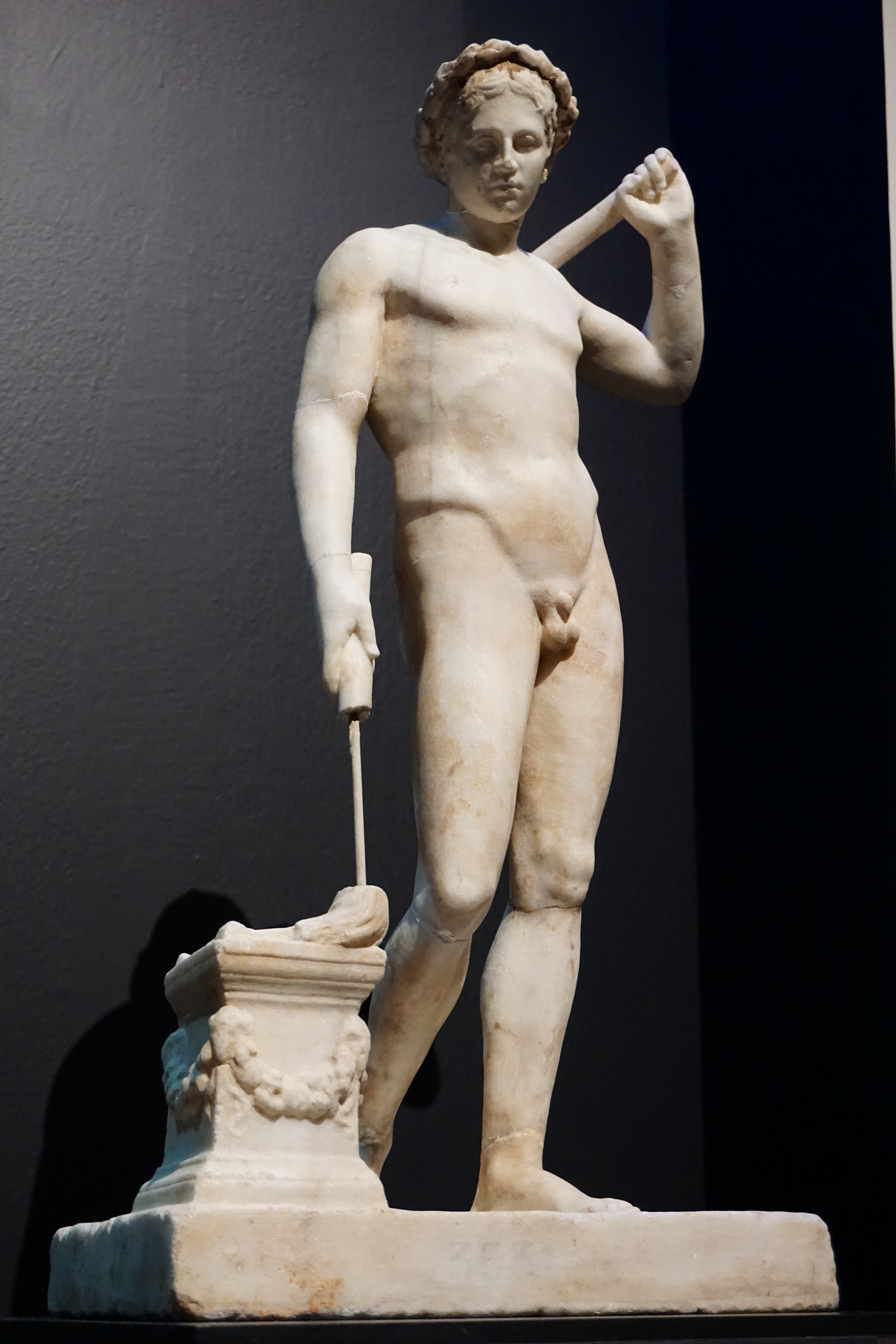
Statuette of a youth with torches, perhaps Thanatos, NAMA.

As the son of Aeolus (and thus a descendant of the Titan Prometheus), Sisyphus was a more-than-mortal figure: when it came to ordinary humans, Thanatos was usually thought of as inexorable. The sole time he was successfully prevented from claiming a mortal life was by the intervention of the hero Heracles, a son of Zeus. Thanatos had come to take the soul of Alkestis, who had offered her life in exchange for the continued life of her husband, King Admetos of Pherai. Heracles was an honored guest in the House of Admetos at the time and offered to repay the king's hospitality by contending with Death itself for Alkestis' life. When Thanatos ascended from Hades to claim Alkestis, Heracles sprung upon the god and overpowered him, winning the right to have Alkestis remain, while Thanatos fled, cheated of his quarry.

Euripides, in Alcestis:

Thanatos: Much talk. Talking will win you nothing. All the same, the woman goes with me to Hades' house. I go to take her now and dedicate her with my sword, for all whose hair is cut in consecration by this blade's edge are devoted to the gods below.

== In art ==
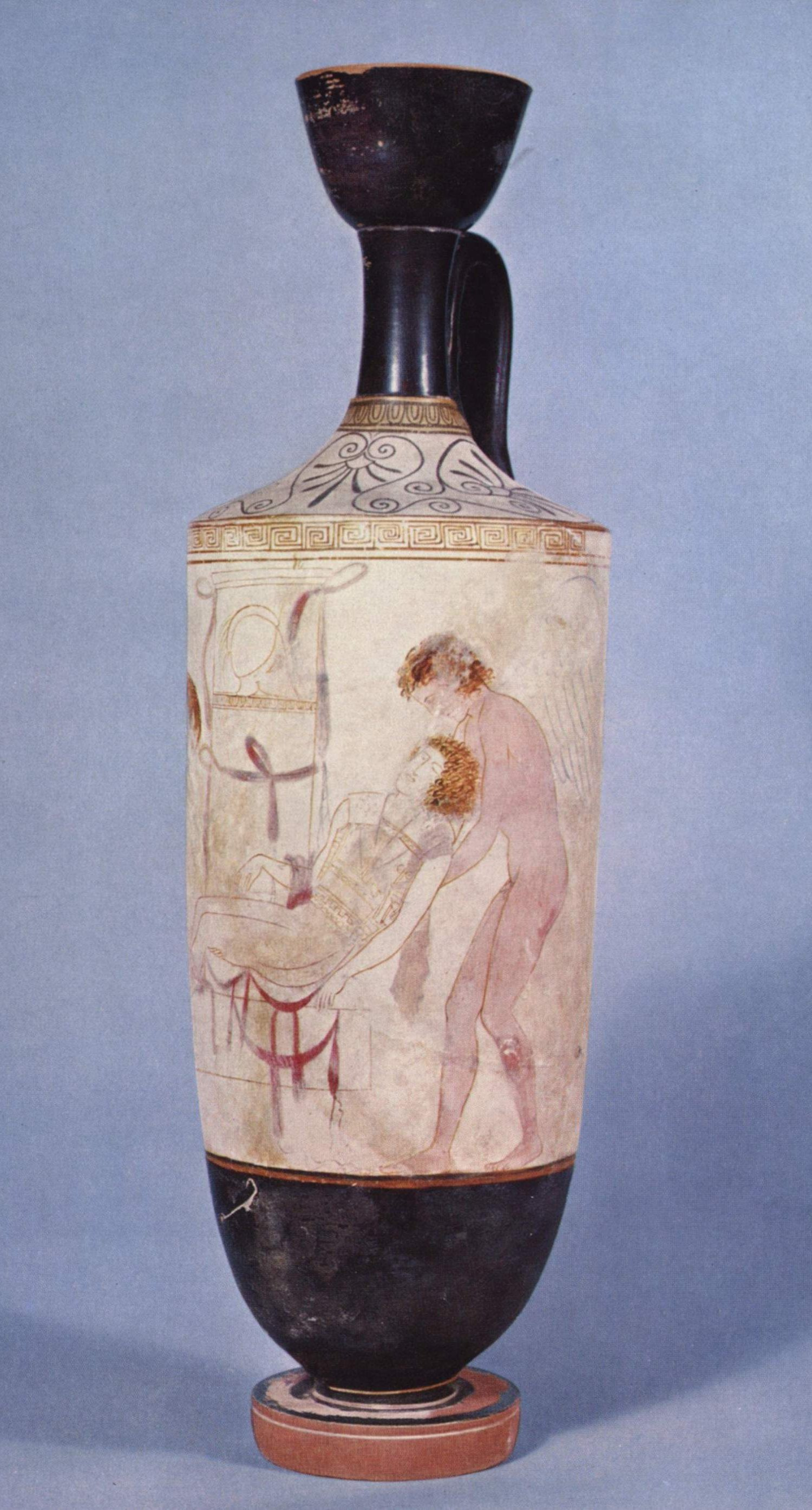
Hypnos and Thanatos carrying the body of Sarpedon from the battlefield of Troy; detail from an Attic white-ground lekythos, ca. 440 BC.

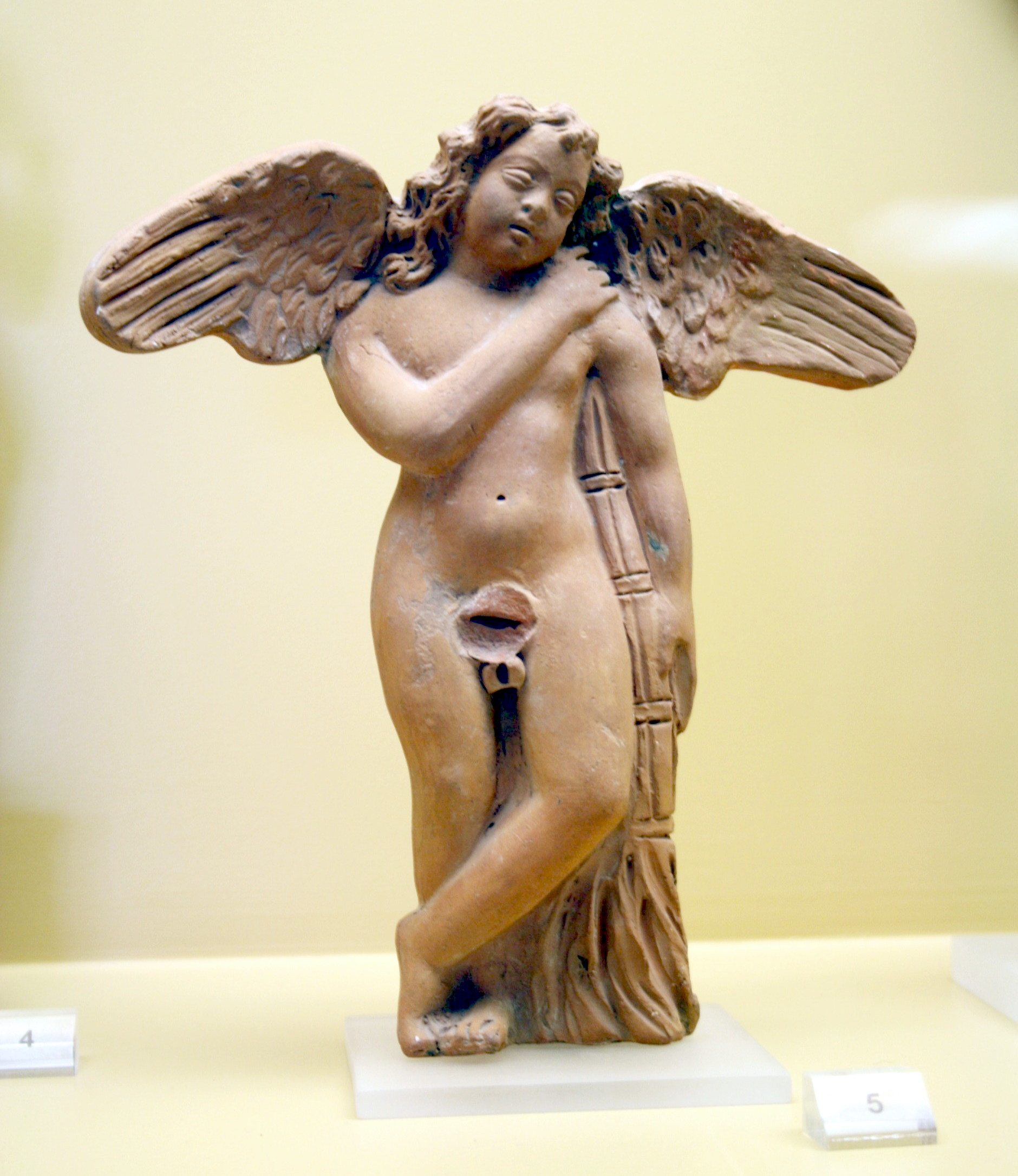
Winged Eros Thanatos, with reversed torch and crossed legs (3rd century BC, Stoa of Attalus, Athens)

An Orphic Hymn that invoked Thanatos, here given in late 18th-century translation:

To Death, Fumigation from Manna.

Hear me, O Death, whose empire unconfin'd
extends to mortal tribes of ev'ry kind.
On thee, the portion of our time depends,
whose absence lengthens life, whose presence ends.

Thy sleep perpetual bursts the vivid folds
by which the soul, attracting body holds:
common to all, of ev'ry sex and age,
for nought escapes thy all-destructive rage.

Not youth itself thy clemency can gain,
vigorous and strong, by thee untimely slain.
In thee the end of nature's works is known,
in thee all judgment is absolved alone.
No suppliant arts thy dreadful rage controul,
no vows revoke the purpose of thy soul.
O blessed power, regard my ardent prayer,
and human life to age abundant spare.

In later eras, as the transition from life to death in Elysium became a more attractive option, Thanatos came to be represented as a beautiful Ephebe. He became associated more with a gentle passing than a woeful demise. Many Roman sarcophagi depict him as a winged boy, very much akin to Cupid: "Eros with crossed legs and torch reversed became the commonest of all symbols for Death", observes Arthur Bernard Cook.

Thanatos has also been portrayed as a slumbering infant in the arms of his mother Nyx, or as a youth carrying a butterfly (the ancient Greek word "ψυχή" can mean soul or butterfly, or life, amongst other things) or a wreath of poppies (poppies were associated with Hypnos and Thanatos because of their hypnogogic traits and the eventual death engendered by overexposure to them).

He is often shown carrying an inverted torch (holding it upside down in his hands), representing a life extinguished. He is usually described as winged and with a sword sheathed at his belt. In Euripides' Alcestis (438 BCE), he is depicted dressed in black and carrying a sword. Thanatos was rarely portrayed in art without his twin brother Hypnos.

Thanatos is also famously shown on the Euphronios Krator where he and his brother Hypnos are shown carrying the body of Sarpedon to his home for burial. Here he is pictured as a full-grown and bearded man with wings, as is his brother.

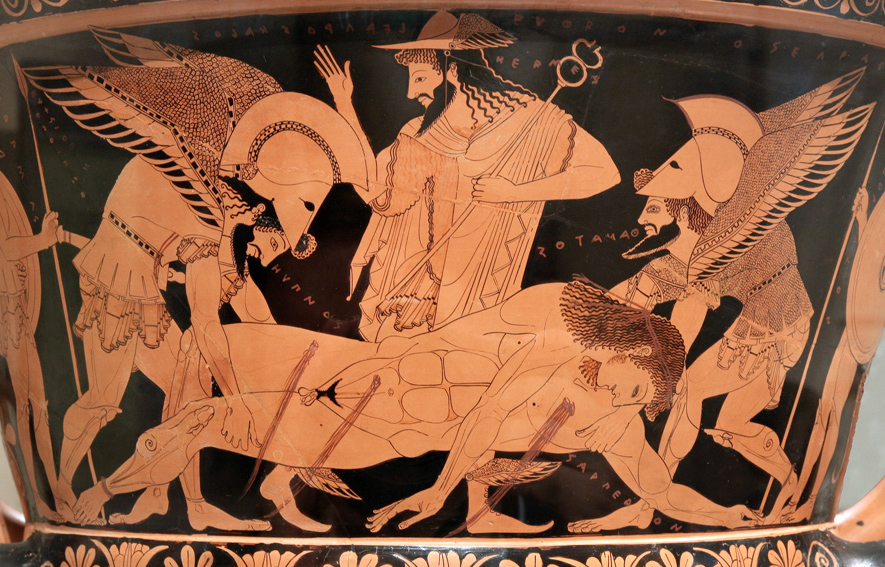
Hypnos (left) and Thanatos (right) carrying dead Sarpedon, while Hermes watches. Inscriptions in ancient Greek read HVPNOS-HERMES-θΑΝΑΤΟS (here written vice versa). Attic red-figured calyx-krater, 515 BC.

== In psychology and medicine ==
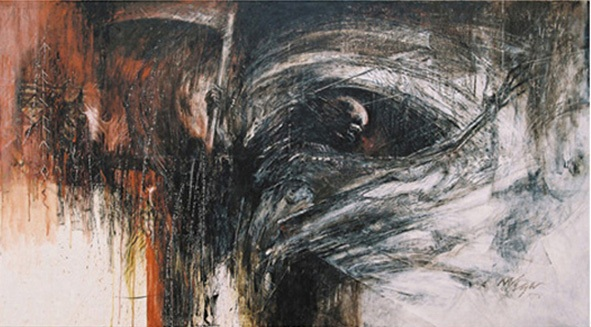
Depiction of Thanatos by Mexican artist Mauricio García Vega

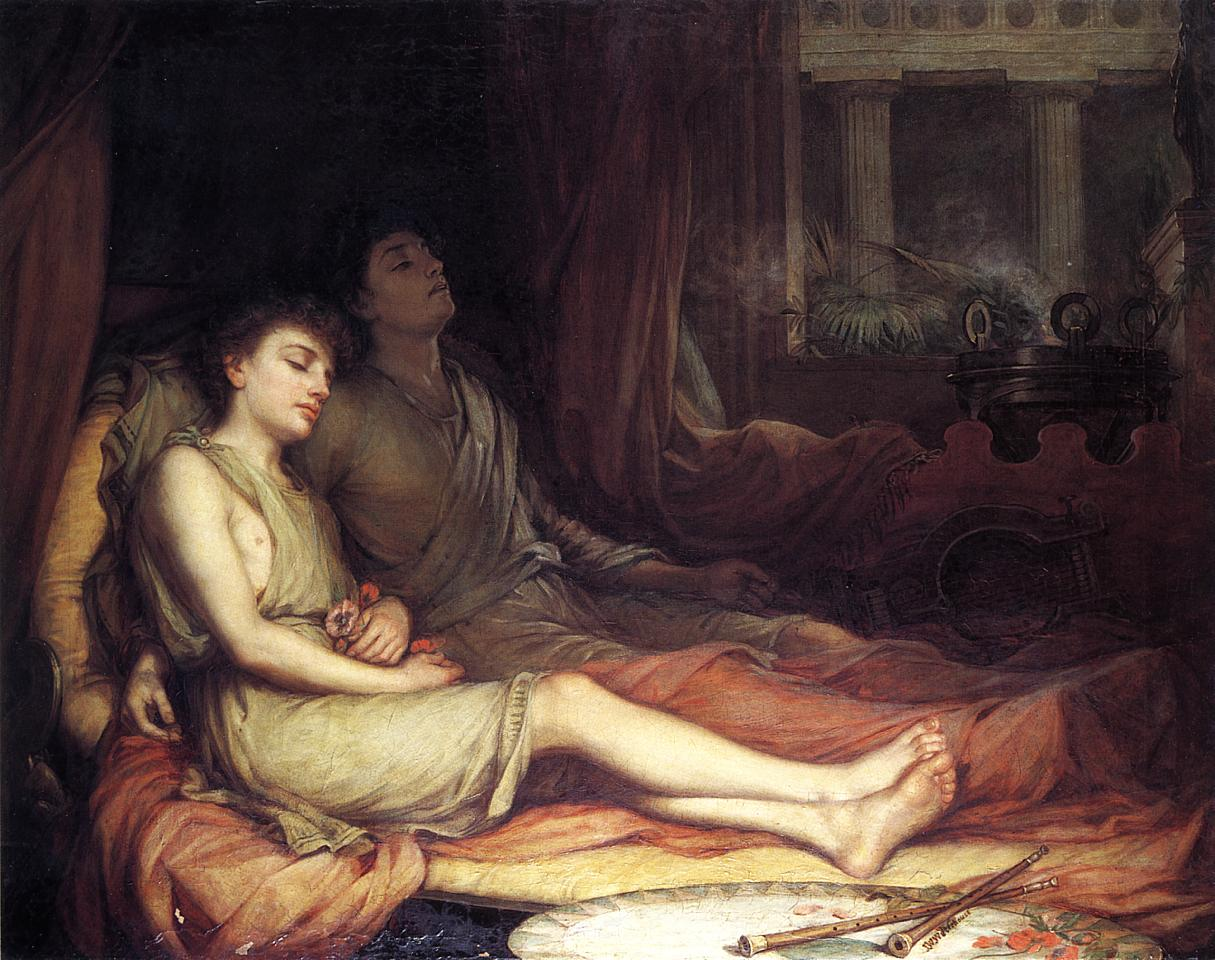
Hypnos and Thanatos: Sleep and His Half-Brother Death, by John William Waterhouse, 1874.

According to Sigmund Freud, humans have a life instinct—which he named "Eros"—and a death drive, which is commonly called (though not by Freud himself) "Thanatos". This postulated death drive allegedly compels humans to engage in risky and self-destructive acts that could lead to their own death. Behaviors such as thrill-seeking and aggression are viewed as actions which stem from this Thanatos instinct.

However, some scientists argue that there is little evidence that most people have a specific drive toward self-destruction. According to them, the behaviors Freud studied can be explained by simpler, known processes, such as salience biases (e.g., a person abuses drugs because the promise of immediate pleasure is more compelling than the intellectual knowledge of harm sometime in the future) and risk calculations (e.g., a person drives recklessly or plays dangerous sports because the increases in status and reproductive success outweigh the risk of injury or death).

Thanatophobia is the fear of things associated with or reminiscent of death and mortality, such as corpses or graveyards. It is related to necrophobia, although the latter term typically refers to a specific fear of dead bodies rather than a fear of death in general.

Thanatology is the academic and scientific study of death among human beings. It investigates the circumstances surrounding a person's death, the grief experienced by the deceased's loved ones, and larger social attitudes towards death such as ritual and memorialization. It is primarily an interdisciplinary study, frequently undertaken by professionals in nursing, psychology, sociology, psychiatry, social work and veterinary science. It also describes bodily changes that accompany death and the after-death period.

Thanatophoric dysplasia, so named because of its lethality at birth, is the most common lethal congenital skeletal dysplasia with an estimated prevalence of one in 6,400 to one in 16,700 births. Its name Thanatophoros, means "death-bearing" in Greek.

Euthanasia, "good death" in Greek, is the act or practice of ending the life of an individual who would otherwise experience severe, incurable suffering or disability. It typically involves lethal injection. Doctor Jack Kevorkian named his euthanasia device the Thanatron.

== See also ==
- Death drive
- Thanatosensitivity
- Thanatosis
- Thanatology
- Pale Horseman, one of the Four Horsemen of the Apocalypse, also named Thanatos
- Thanatophobia
