= Hypnos =

Personification of sleep in Greek mythology

- God of sleep
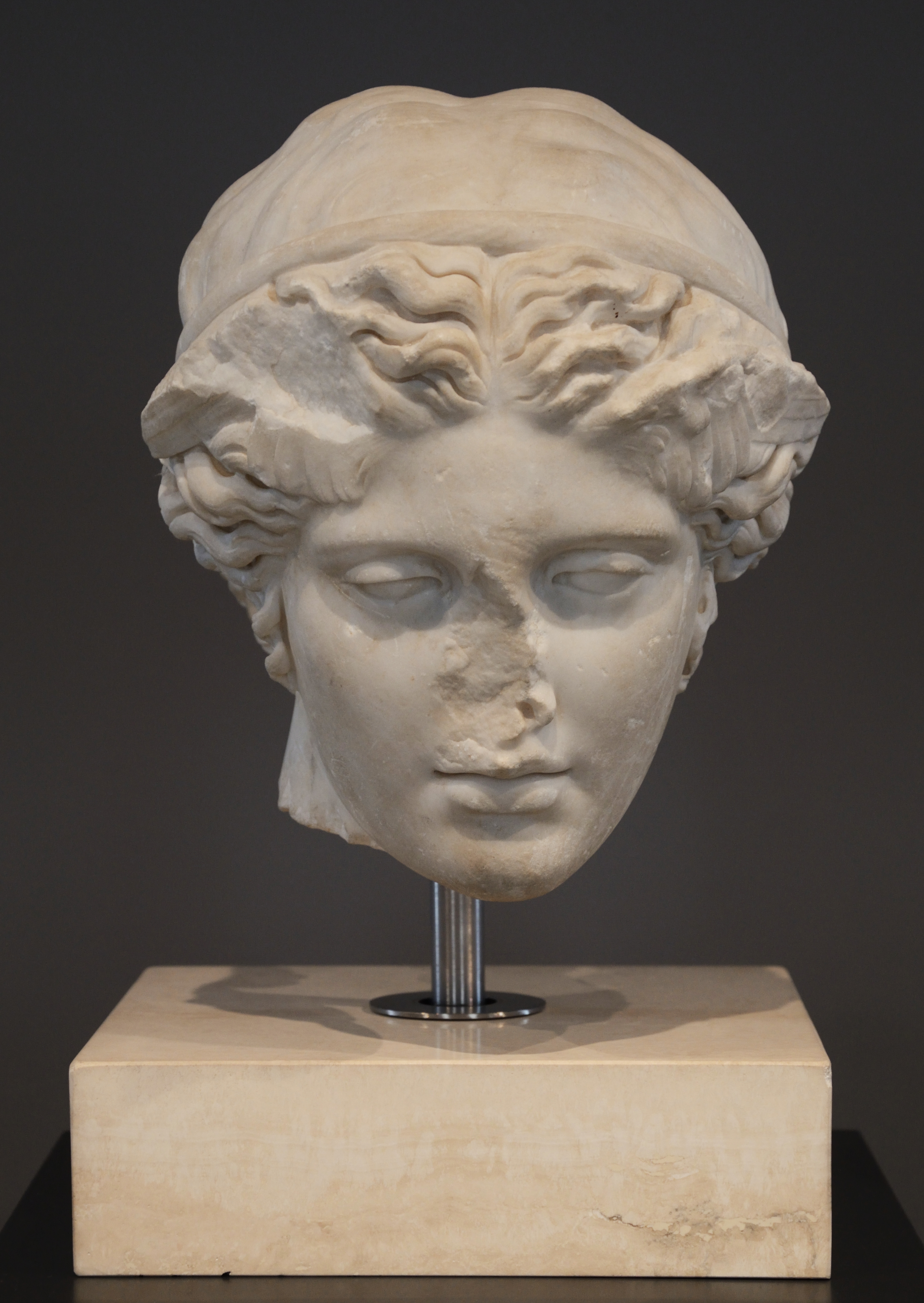
- Marble head of Hypnos in the National Roman Museum, Rome
- Abode: Underworld

Genealogy
- Parents: Nyx
- Siblings: Thanatos
- Consorts: Pasithea

Equivalents
- Roman: Somnus

In Greek mythology, Hypnos (/ˈhɪpnɒs/; Ancient Greek: Ὕπνος, 'sleep'), also spelled Hypnus, is the personification of sleep. The Roman equivalent is Somnus. His name is the origin of the word hypnosis. Pausanias wrote that Hypnos was the dearest friend of the Muses.

== Etymology ==
According to the Dutch linguist Robert S. P. Beekes, the god's name derives from the Proto-Indo-European root *sup-no- 'sleep'.

== Family ==
Hypnos lived next to his twin brother, Thanatos (Θάνατος, 'death'), in the underworld, where the rays of the sun never reached them.

In Hesiod's Theogony, Hypnos is one of the offspring of Nyx (Νύξ, 'Night'), the goddess of Night, without a father. In genealogies from works by Roman authors, he is the son of Erebus (Darkness) and Nox (Night, the Roman name for Nyx). In the Iliad, Nyx is a dreadful and powerful goddess, and even Zeus fears to enter her realm.

His wife, Pasithea, is one of the youngest of the Charites and is promised to him by Hera, who is the goddess of marriage and birth.

== Description ==
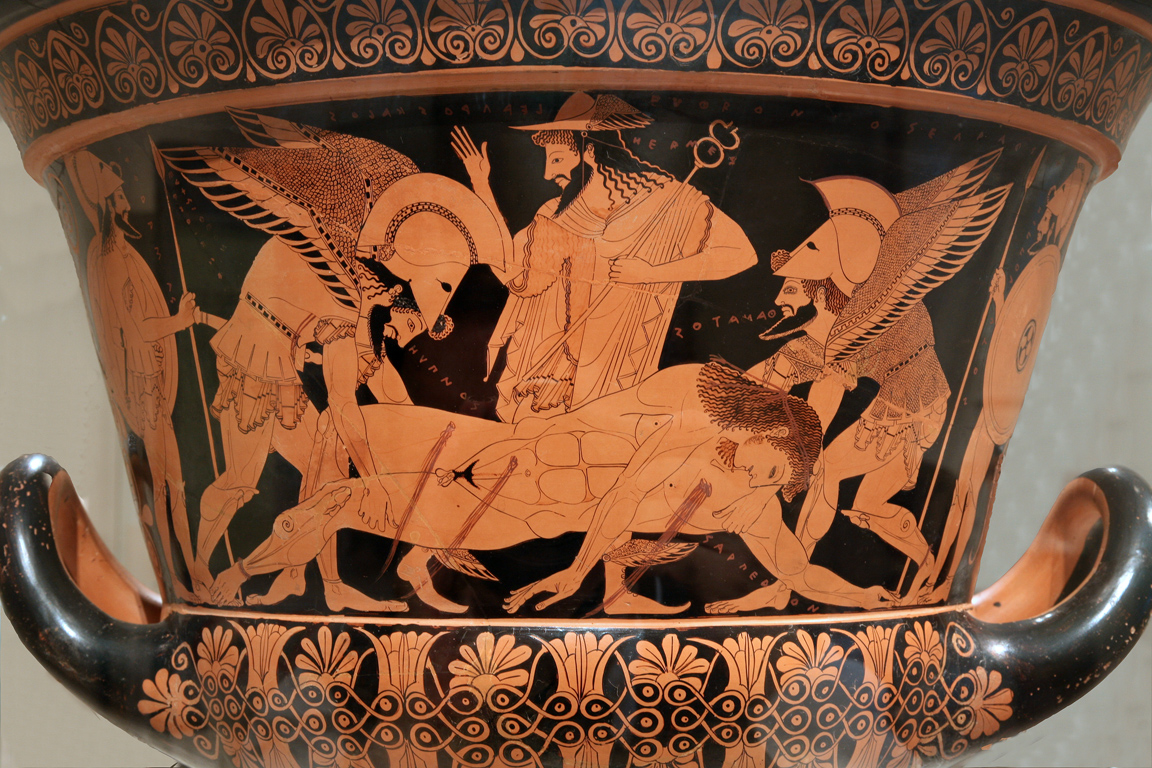
Hypnos (left) and Thanatos (right) carry the body of Sarpedon while Hermes watches, Euphronios Krater, an Attic red-figure calyx-krater, c. 515–510 BC

Hypnos, together with his brother Thanatos, live in the underworld (Hades). According to rumors, Hypnos lived in a big cave, which the river Lethe ("Forgetfulness") comes from and where night and day meet. They call this area the Land of Dreams. His bed is made of ebony, and on the entrance of the cave grow several poppies and other soporific plants. No light and no sound would ever enter his grotto. According to Homer, he lives on the island Lemnos, which later has been claimed to be his very own dream island. He is said to be a calm and gentle god, as he helps humans in need and, due to their sleep, owns half of their lives.

== Mythology ==
=== Hypnos in the Iliad ===
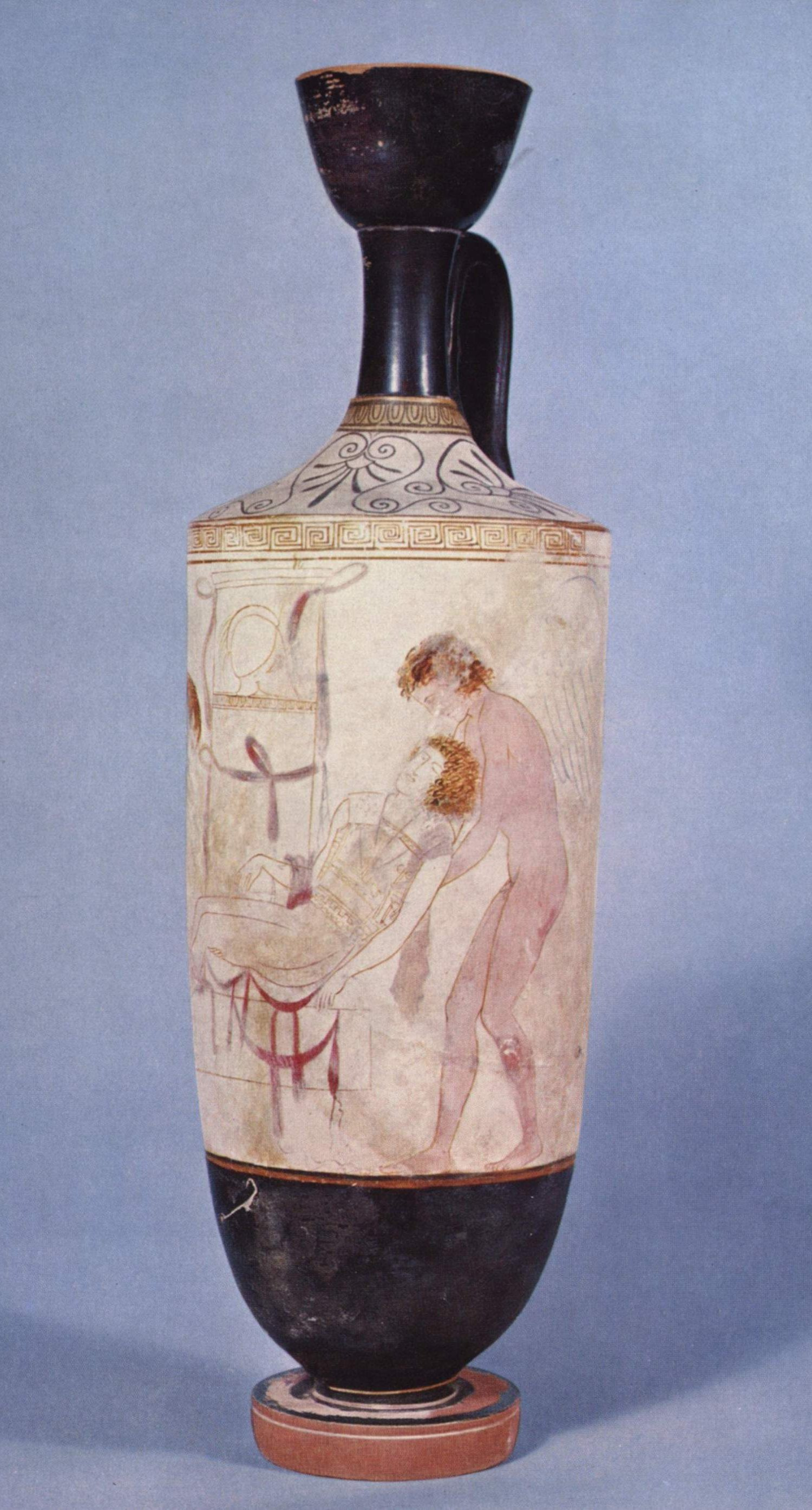
Hypnos and Thanatos carrying the body of Sarpedon from the battlefield of Troy; detail from an Attic white-ground lekythos, ca. 440 BC.

Hypnos was able to trick Zeus and help the Danaans win the Trojan War. During the war, Hera loathed her brother and husband, Zeus, so she devised a plot to trick him. She decided that to trick him she needed to make him so enamored with her that he would fall for the trick. So she washed herself with ambrosia and anointed herself with oil, made especially for her to make herself impossible for Zeus to resist. She wove flowers through her hair, put on three brilliant pendants for earrings, and donned a wondrous robe. She then called for Aphrodite, the goddess of love, and asked her for a charm that would ensure that her trick would not fail. To procure the charm, however, she lied to Aphrodite because they sided on opposite sides of the war. She told Aphrodite that she wanted the charm to help herself and Zeus stop fighting. Aphrodite willingly agreed. Hera was almost ready to trick Zeus, but she needed the help of Hypnos, who had tricked Zeus once before.

Hera called on Hypnos and asked him to help her by putting Zeus to sleep. Hypnos was reluctant because the last time he had put the god to sleep, he was furious when he awoke. It was Hera who had asked him to trick Zeus the first time as well. She was furious that Heracles, Zeus' son, sacked the city of the Trojans. So she had Hypnos put Zeus to sleep, and set blasts of angry winds upon the sea while Heracles was still sailing home. When Zeus awoke he was furious and went on a rampage looking for Hypnos. Hypnos managed to avoid Zeus by hiding with his mother, Nyx. This made Hypnos reluctant to accept Hera's proposal and help her trick Zeus again. Hera first offered him a beautiful golden seat that can never fall apart and a footstool to go with it. He refused this first offer, remembering the last time he tricked Zeus. Hera finally got him to agree by promising that he would be married to Pasithea, one of the youngest Graces, whom he had always wanted to marry. Hypnos made her swear by the river Styx and call on the gods of the underworld to be witnesses so that he would be ensured that he would marry Pasithea.

Hera went to see Zeus on Gargarus, the topmost peak of Mount Ida. Zeus was extremely taken by her and suspected nothing as Hypnos was shrouded in a thick mist and hidden upon a pine tree that was close to where Hera and Zeus were talking. Zeus asked Hera what she was doing there and why she had come from Olympus, and she told him the same lie she told Aphrodite. She told him that she wanted to go help her parent stop quarreling and she stopped there to consult him because she didn't want to go without his knowledge and have him be angry with her when he found out. Zeus said that she could go any time and that she should postpone her visit and stay there with him so they could enjoy each other's company. He told her that he was never in love with anyone as much as he loved her at that moment. He took her in his embrace and Hypnos went to work putting him to sleep, with Hera in his arms. While this went on, Hypnos traveled to the ships of the Achaeans to tell Poseidon, God of the Sea, that he could now help the Danaans and give them a victory while Zeus was sleeping. This is where Hypnos leaves the story, leaving Poseidon eager to help the Danaans. Thanks to Hypnos helping to trick Zeus, the war changed its course in Hera's favor, and Zeus never found out that Hypnos had tricked him one more time.

=== Hypnos and Endymion ===
According to a passage in Deipnosophistae, the sophist and dithyrambic poet Licymnius of Chios tells a different tale about the Endymion myth, in which Hypnos loves Endymion and does not close the eyes of his beloved even while he is asleep, but lulls him to rest with eyes wide open so that he may without interruption enjoy the pleasure of gazing at them.

== Hypnos in art ==
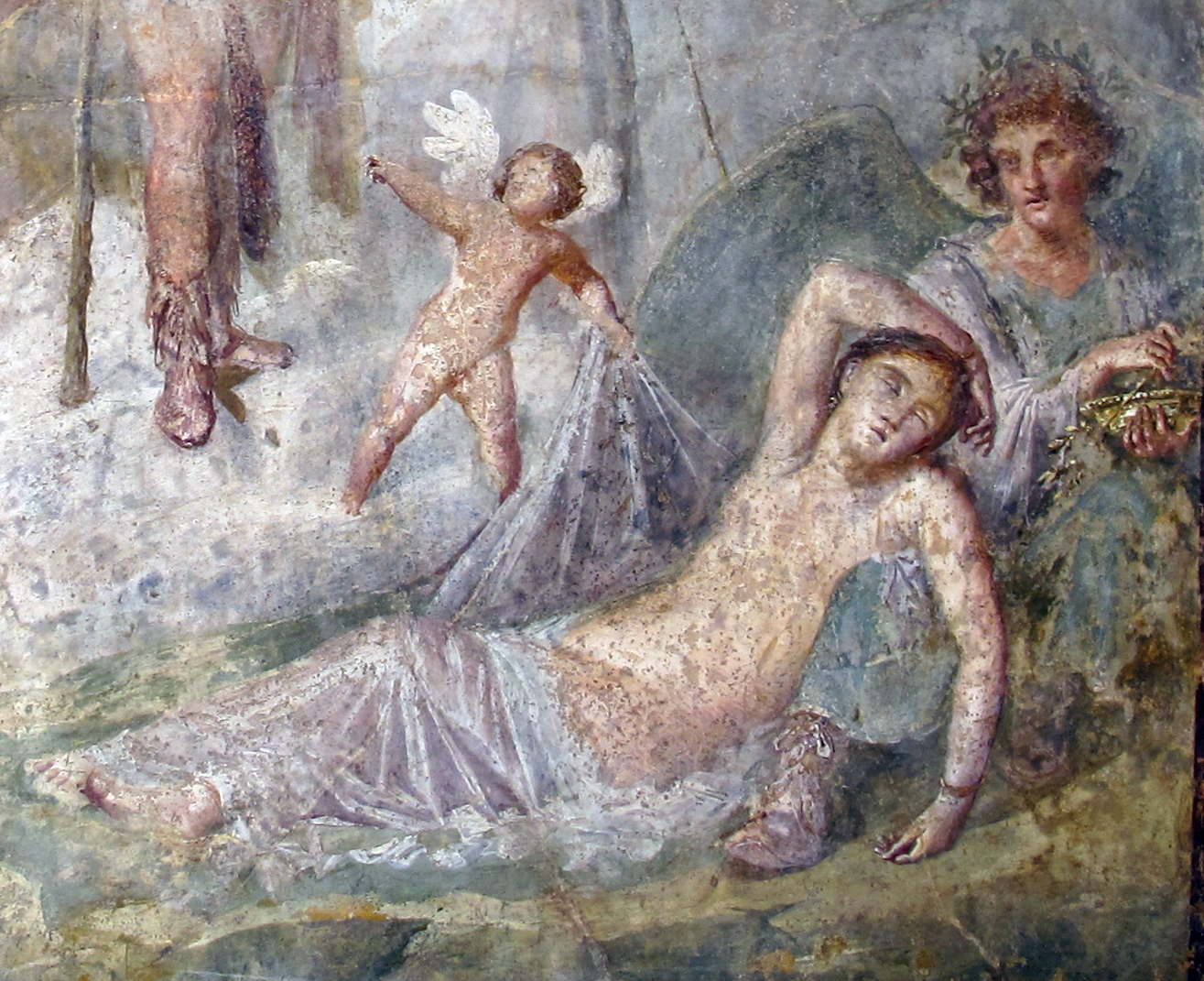
Ariadne asleep at Hypnos's side. Detail of ancient fresco in Pompeii

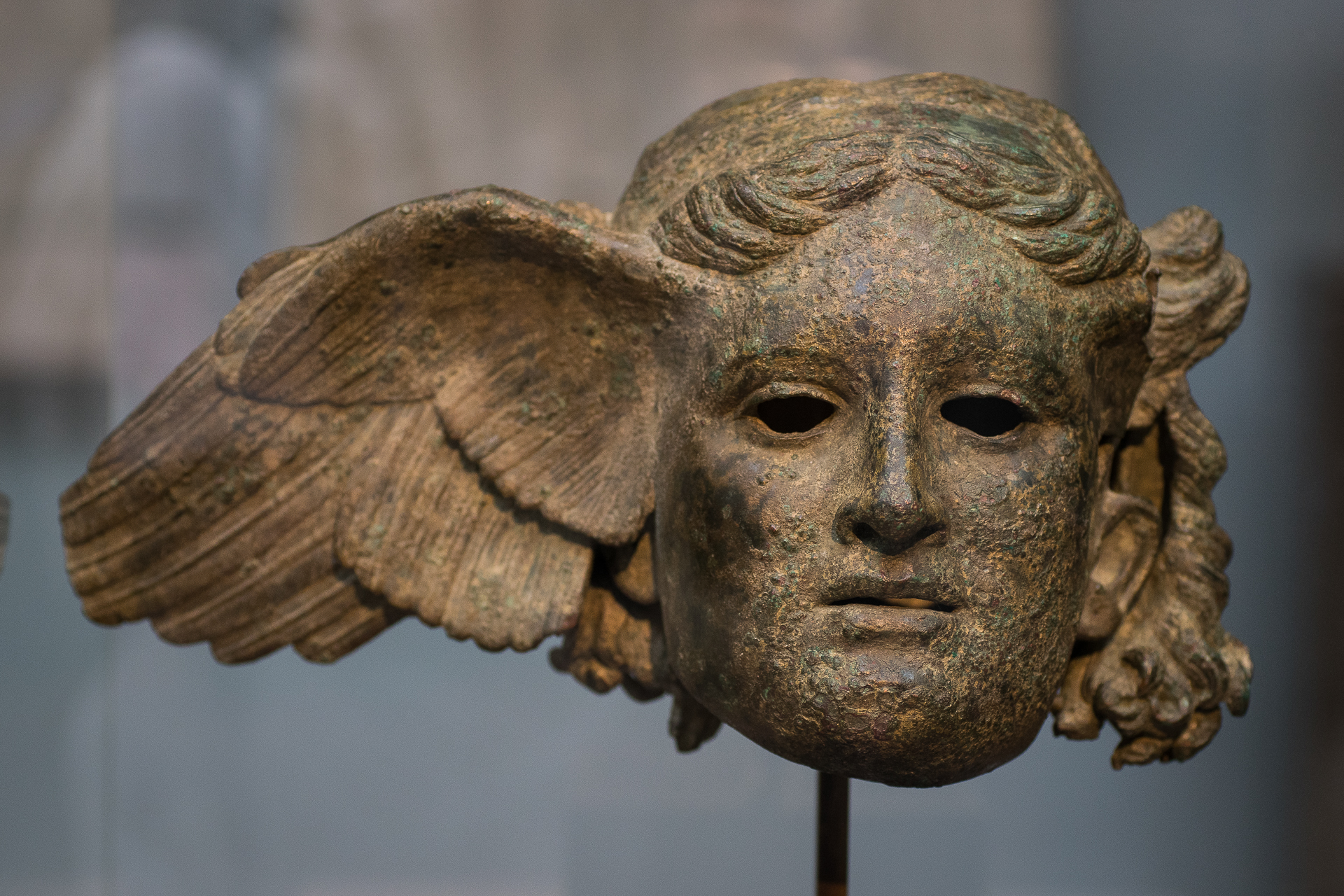
Bronze Head of Hypnos found in Civitella d'Arno, Italy

Hypnos appears in numerous works of art, most of which are vases. An example of one vase that Hypnos is featured on is called "Ariadne Abandoned by Theseus," which is part of the Museum of Fine Arts in Boston's collection. In this vase, Hypnos is shown as a winged god dripping Lethean water upon the head of Ariadne as she sleeps.

There are only three bronze statues featuring Hypnos known to be found in the Roman world. The first one was found in mid-19th century in Civitella d'Arno (Italy), kept in the British Museum in London since 1868. This bronze head has wings sprouting from his temples and the hair is elaborately arranged, some tying in knots and some hanging freely from his head. The second one, a torsus, was found in Jumilla (Spain) in 1893 and is now exhibited at the Berlin antiquities collection. The most recent discovery took place in 1988 in Almedinilla (also in Spain), where bronze statue almost intact of Hypnos was found in a Roman villa dated in the 2nd century A.D. It is kept in the local History & Archaeology Museum.

The National Roman Museum of the Italian capital keeps an Hypnos marble head found in Hadrian's Villa, built around 120 AD by Emperor Hadrian in Tivoli as a retreat not far from Rome.

== Words derived from Hypnos ==
The English word "hypnosis" is derived from his name, referring to the fact that when hypnotized, a person is put into a sleep-like state (hypnosis "sleep" + -osis "condition"). The class of medicines known as "hypnotics" which induce sleep also take their name from Hypnos.

== See also ==
- Aergia, a goddess of sloth and attendant of Hypnos
- Morpheus

== Bibliography ==
- Athenaeus, The Learned Banqueters, Volume V: Books 10.420e-11, edited and translated by S. Douglas Olson, Loeb Classical Library No. 274, Cambridge, Massachusetts, Harvard University Press, 2009. ISBN 978-0-674-99632-8. Online version at Harvard University Press.
- Cicero, Marcus Tullius, De Natura Deorum in Cicero: On the Nature of the Gods. Academics, translated by H. Rackham, Loeb Classical Library No. 268, Cambridge, Massachusetts, Harvard University Press, first published 1933, revised 1951. ISBN 978-0-674-99296-2. Online version at Harvard University Press. Internet Archive.
- Hesiod, Theogony, in The Homeric Hymns and Homerica with an English Translation by Hugh G. Evelyn-White, Cambridge, MA., Harvard University Press; London, William Heinemann Ltd. 1914. Online version at the Perseus Digital Library.
- Homer, The Iliad with an English Translation by A.T. Murray, Ph.D. in two volumes. Cambridge, MA., Harvard University Press; London, William Heinemann, Ltd. 1924. Online version at the Perseus Digital Library.
- Hyginus, Fabulae in Apollodorus' Library and Hyginus' Fabulae: Two Handbooks of Greek Mythology, Translated, with Introductions by R. Scott Smith and Stephen M. Trzaskoma, Hackett Publishing, 2007. ISBN 978-0-87220-821-6. Google Books.
- Lexicon Iconographicum Mythologiae Classicae (LIMC) VII.1., Zürich and Munich, Artemis Verlag, 1994. ISBN 3-7608-8751-1. Internet Archive.
- Tripp, Edward, Crowell's Handbook of Classical Mythology, Thomas Y. Crowell Co; First edition (June 1970). ISBN 069022608X.
