= Leuce (mythology) =

Greek nymph

In Greco-Roman mythology, Leuce or Leuke (Ancient Greek: Λεύκη, romanized: Leúkē, lit. 'white', specifically "white poplar"), was an Oceanid nymph, one of the daughters of the Titans Oceanus and Tethys.

== Mythology ==
Hades abducted her to the underworld. She lived out the span of her life in his realm, and when she died, the god turned her into a white poplar which he placed in the Elysian Fields. To celebrate his return from the underworld, the hero Heracles crowned himself with a branch of this tree.

== Mythology of the poplar ==
The myth of the Heliades and Phaethon depicts a recurrent theme of connecting poplars with death and mourning which traces since at least the 4th century BC, in fragments by Philoxenus of Cythera, and also referenced in later works such as Apollonius Rhodius' Argonautica and Ovid's Metamorphoses, yet the poplars in these myth are black.

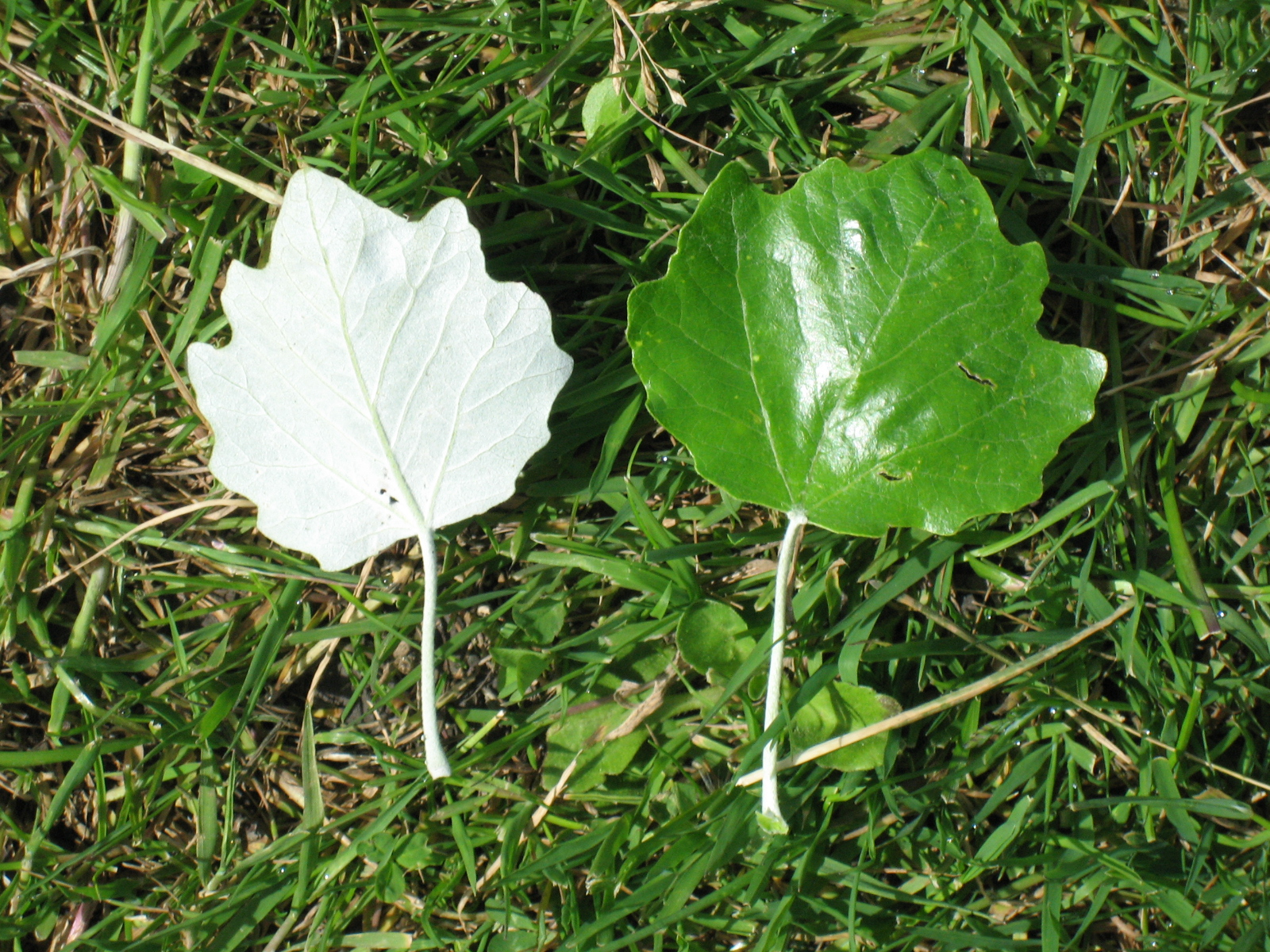
The two sides of the white poplar leaf

Maurus Servius Honoratus identifies the tree as the white poplar, the leaf of which is distinctively two-sided, one white and one dark. The double color, Servius says, made a wreath that represented the duality of the hero's labors in both the upper and the underworld. The association of white poplar leaves with Herakles is also attested by archaeological remains, such as the poplar-leaf motif carved on a statue base found in a small sanctuary to Herakles (Roman Hercules) along the Tiber river. It has been suggested that behind the vague outlines of this tale lurks an older myth having to do with Herakles' encounter with the river deity Achelous, who had chthonic associations and whose name was the subject of speculative theological etymology among the Greeks, in this case involving acherōïs, another Greek word for "poplar". In a founding myth of the 1st century BC, Herakles is supposed to have established the Arvernian oppidum of Alesia, the name of which likely derives from the Gaulish word for poplar.

Celebrants of the Bacchic rites wore a wreath of poplar leaves to honor the chthonic aspect of Dionysus.

At Elis, white poplar was the only wood used in sacrifices to Zeus, according to Pausanias, because Herakles imported the tree and used it to burn the thigh bones of sacrificial victims at Olympia. The oak is the customary sacred tree of Zeus, and the substitution among the Eleans may simply reflect the more widespread growth habit of the poplar there. The hero was supposed to have discovered the tree growing on the banks of the upperworld Acheron in Thesprotia. Pausanias says this is the reason for the Homeric epithet Acherōïda for the white poplar, which was also called leukē in Greek.

The white poplar might be worn as a crown at athletic contests in honor of Herakles, a patron of the Olympic games. Its infernal origin made it appropriate for funeral games, which played an important role in the development of Greek athletics.

The white poplar was also sacred to Persephone, for whom Leuce seems to be a doublet or epithet, as a goddess of regeneration. Robert Graves used the myth of Leuce in developing his poetic theories of mythology. Graves, for instance, holds that the back of the poplar leaf was turned white by the sweat of Herakles. In The White Goddess, he names the white poplar as one of the "three trees of resurrection", along with alder and cypress.

== See also ==
- Heliades
- Crocus
- Hyacinthus
- Minthe
