= List of fortune deities =

Gods and goddesses of fortune
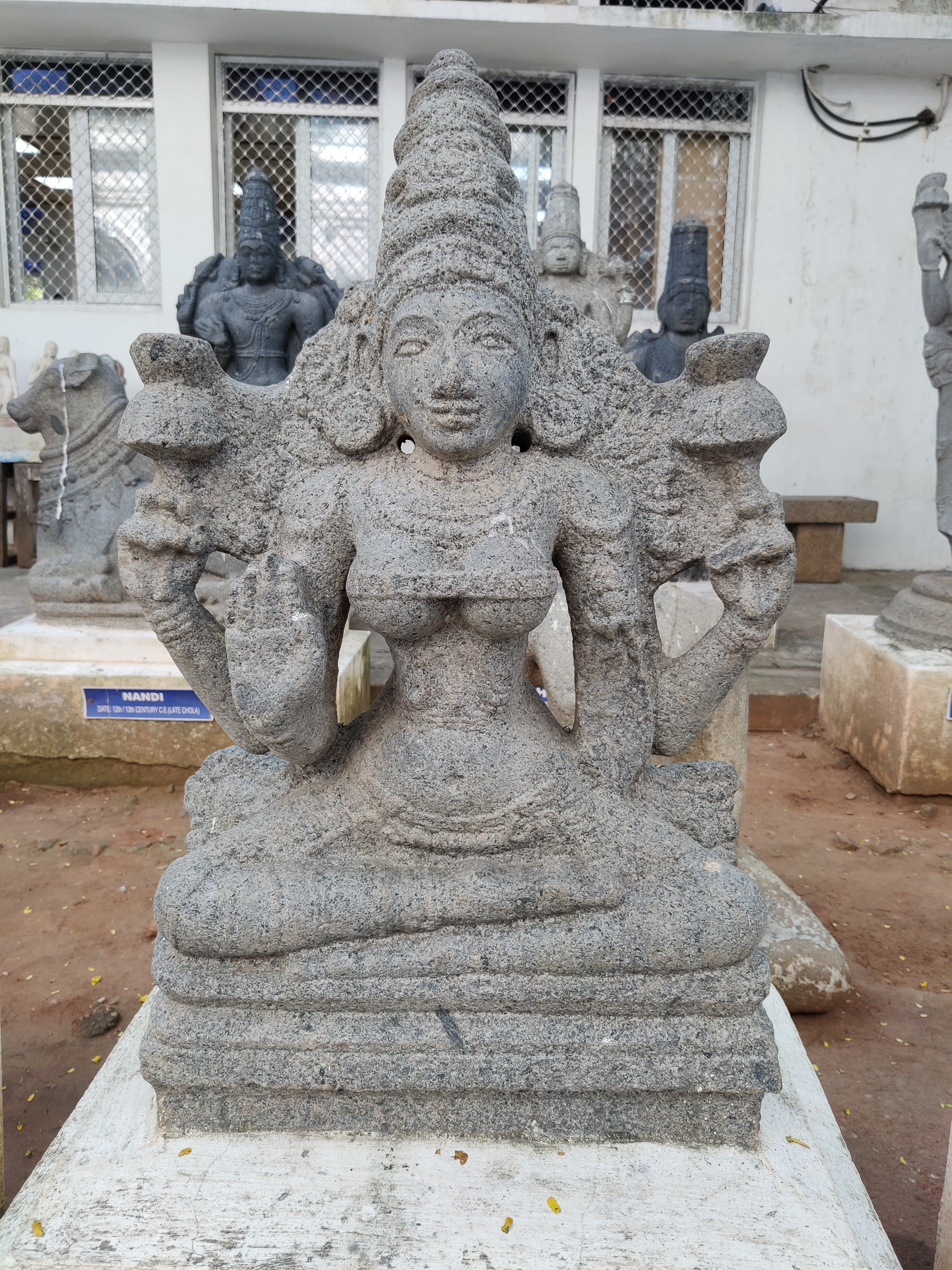
Goddess Lakshmi of Hinduism

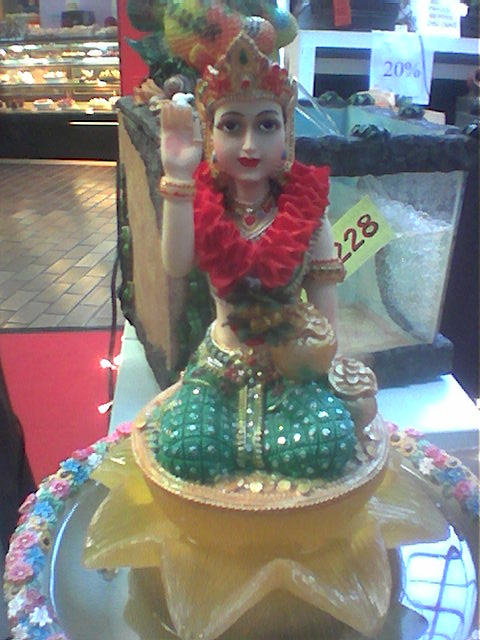
Goddess Nang Kwak of Tai folk religion

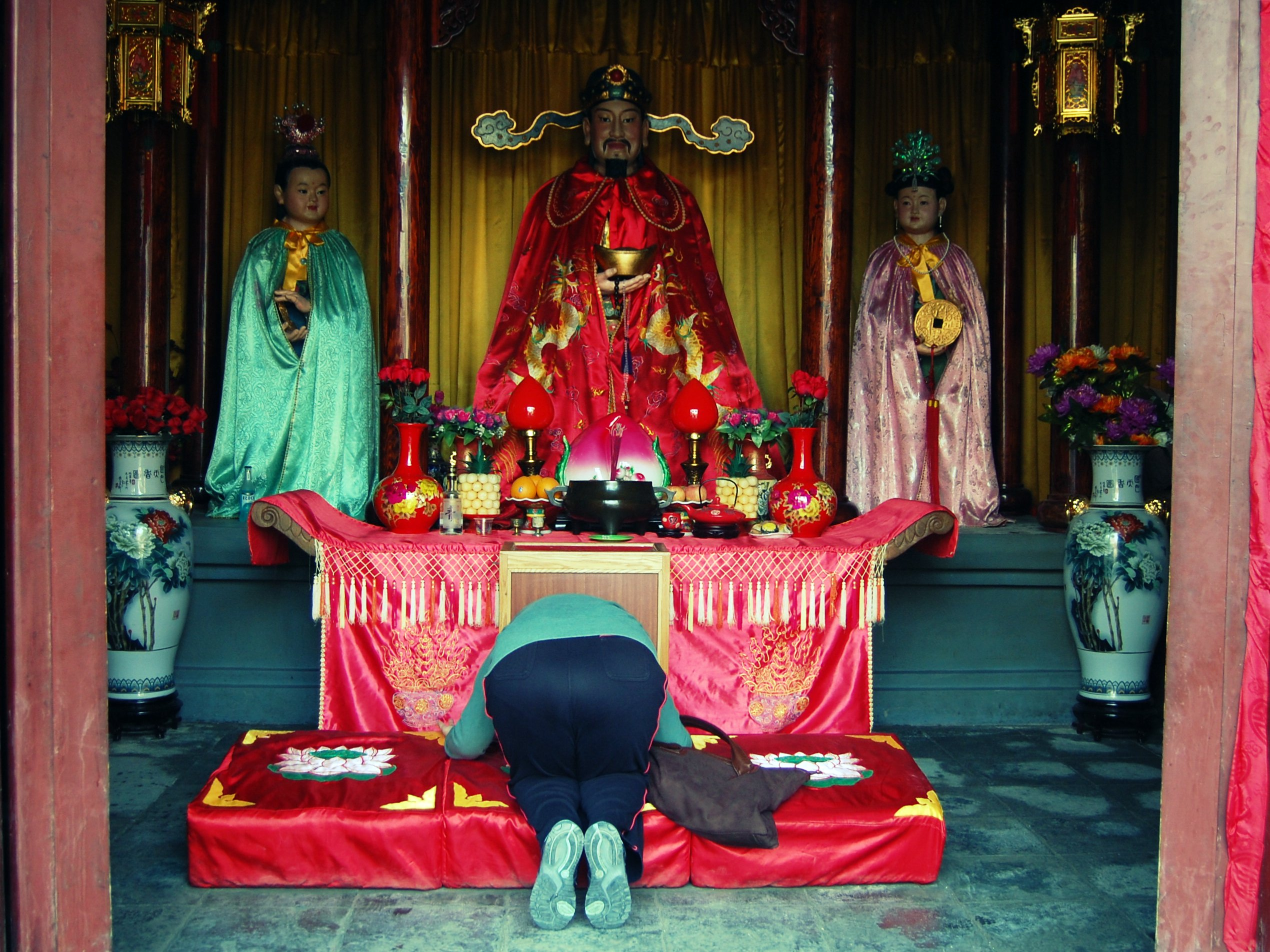
Lord Caishen of Chinese folk religion and Taoism

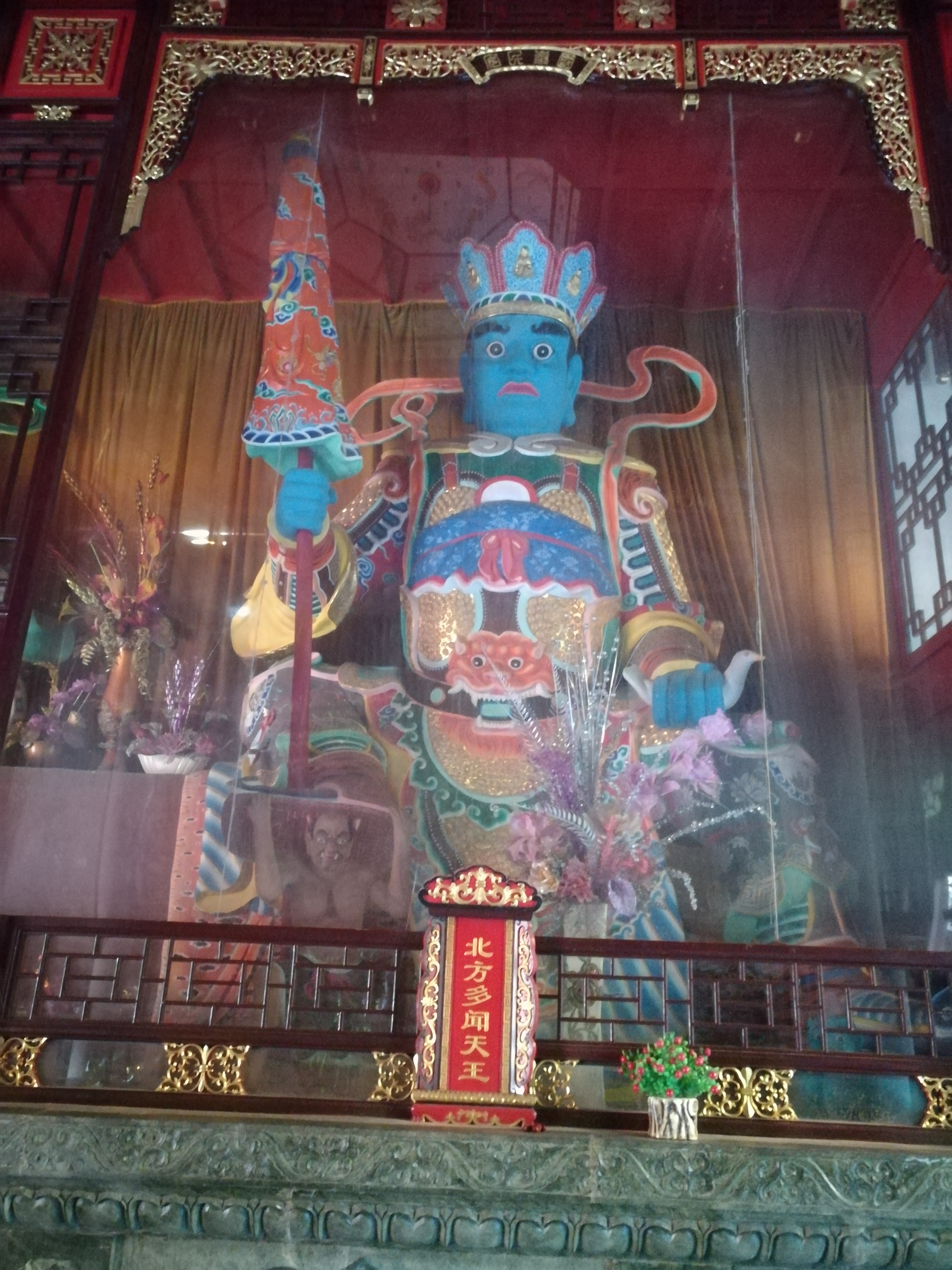
Lord Vaiśravaṇa of Mahayana
Gods and goddesses of fortune

A fortune deity is a deity associated with fortune, luck and wealth in mythology.

== Burmese folk religion ==
- Thurathadi

== Chinese folk religion and Taoism ==
- Caishen (財神) — God of Wealth; collective designation for several deified historical figures.
- Zhao Gongming (趙公明) — Military God of Wealth (武財神); central figure of the Five Roads Wealth Gods.
- Bi Gan (比干) — principal Civil God of Wealth (文財神); Shang dynasty prince.
- Fan Li (范蠡) — also known as Tao Zhugong (陶朱公); Spring and Autumn period statesman and patron of merchants.
- The Five Caishen of all directions (五路神)
- Goddess Qianmu Caishen (錢母財神)
- Goddess Wuji Caishenye (無極財神爺)
- Fuxing (福星) and Luxing (祿星) — two of the Three Stars (Fu Lu Shou); not Shouxing, which is the Star of Longevity rather than fortune.
- Tudigong (土地公) — the Earth God; widely venerated as a local prosperity deity.
- Guandi (關帝) — the deified Guan Yu; venerated since the late imperial period as a wealth and protective deity in commercial premises.
- Liu Hai (劉海) — Taoist immortal associated with side-wealth (偏財神).

== Filipino religion ==
- Ikapati
- Burigadang Pada Sinaklang Bulawan

== Greek religion ==
- Hermes
- Tyche
- Plutus
- Hades
- Caerus

== Hinduism ==
- Lakshmi: Goddess of wealth, fortune and luck.
- Kubera: God of wealth
- Ganesha: God of wisdom, luck and good beginnings; associated with wealth and fortune.
- Alakshmi: Goddess of misfortune.
- Agni: God of fire, wealth and food (in the vedas).

== Zoroastrianism ==
- Khwarrah: Yazata of good fortune, success and divine glory
- Ashi Vanguhi: Yazata of good reward and capricious luck

== Igbo religion ==
- Anyanwu
- Agwu Nsi

== Japanese mythology ==
- Daikokuten
- Ebisu
- Seven Lucky Gods

== Korean mythology ==
- Gameunjang-aegi
- Chilsungshin

== Mahayana ==
- Śrīmahādevī
- Vaiśravaṇa
- Benzaiten
- Kangiten

== Norse religion ==
- Njörðr

== Nubian mythology ==
- Dedun

== Roman religion ==
- Fortuna
- Mercury
- Pluto
- Dis Pater
- Abundantia

== Semitic religion ==
- Gad

== Shinto ==
- Ame-no-Sagume
- Seven Lucky Gods

== Thai folk religion ==
- Nang Kwak: Goddess of wealth, fortune and luck
- Phosop: Goddess of wealth
- Mae ya nang (แม่ย่านาง) : Goddess of luck and good beginnings; associated with wealth and fortune.
- Phra phum chaiya mongkol (พระภูมิชัยมงคล) :
- Phra Nang phum chaiya ( wife of Phra phum chaiya mongkol ) (พระนางภูมิไชยา) :
- Kuman thong, a deity that bestow luck and fortune if properly revered

== Thracian mythology ==
- Derzelas: god of abundance

== Tibetan Buddhism ==
- Jambala: god of wealth and underground treasures such as minerals and jewels

== Vajrayana ==
- Vasudhara
- Jambhala
- Palden Lhamo

== Vietnamese folk religion ==
- Thần Tài
- Bà Chúa Kho

== Yoruba ==
- Aje
