= Minthe =

Greek Naiad nymph

- Chthonic Naiad nymph
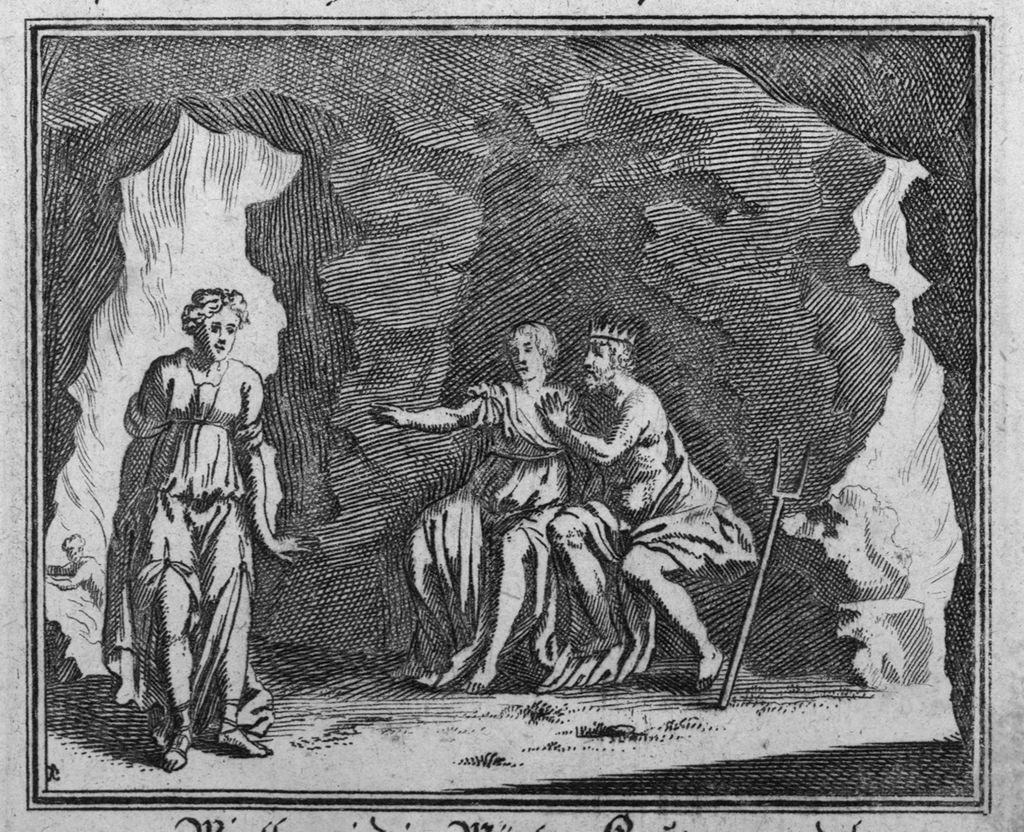
- Minthe being turned into a Mint-Plant, Johann Ulrich Kraus
- Greek: Μίνθη
- Abode: Underworld
- Symbols: Mint
- Consort: Hades

In ancient Greek religion and Greek mythology, Minthe or Mintha (Ancient Greek: Μίνθη, romanized: Mínthē, lit. 'mint') is an underworld naiad associated with the river Cocytus. She was a mistress of Hades, the king of the underworld, and was transformed into a mint plant by either his wife Persephone or Demeter, Persephone's mother. The plant was also called by some as hedyosmos (Ancient Greek: ἡδύοσμος), which means "sweet-smelling".

== Etymology ==
The ancient Greek noun μίνθη or μίνθα translates to 'mint'. According to Robert Beekes, it is of undoubtedly pre-Greek origin due to the variant ending in "-ᾰ". The -nth-/-nthos- element in menthe has been described as a characteristic of a class of words borrowed from a pre-Greek language; compare akanthos, Zakynthos, labyrinthos, Korinthos, and hyakinthos. The word has been also found in a Bronze Age tablet, spelled in Linear B as 𐀖𐀲 (mi-ta).

== Mythology ==
The naiad Minthe became concubine to Hades, the lord of the Underworld and god of the dead. In jealousy, his wife Persephone intervened and metamorphosed Minthe, in the words of Strabo's account, "into the garden mint, which some call hedyosmos (lit. 'sweet-smelling')". A mountain near Pylos was named after Minthe, where one of the few temples of Hades in Greece was situated:

Near Pylus, towards the east, is a mountain named after Minthe, who, according to myth, became the concubine of Hades, was trampled under foot by Core, and was transformed into garden-mint, the plant which some call Hedyosmos. Furthermore, near the mountain is a precinct sacred to Hades

Similarly to that, a scholiast on Nicander wrote that Minthe became Hades' mistress; for this Persephone tore her into pieces, but Hades turned his dead lover into the fragrant plant that bore her name in her memory. Ovid also briefly mentions Minthe and her transformation at the hands of Persephone in his Metamorphoses, but neglects to mention the story behind it.

According to Oppian, Minthe had been Hades' mistress before he had abducted and married Persephone, but he set her aside once he carried off and married his queen. Afterwards, she would boast that she surpassed Persephone in beauty and that Hades would soon return to her and banish Persephone from the subterranean halls. In anger over the nymph's insolence, Persephone's mother Demeter trampled her in anger, obliterating Minthe, and thus from the earth sprang the mint herb.

Bell notes that Demeter went through too much pain following Persephone's abduction and partial return to tolerate any adulterous behaviour against her daughter. Oppian writing that she was trampled to death is perhaps an allusion to the verb μινύθω, minytho, meaning "to reduce". Orpheus wrote that Demeter, seeing the mint sad, hated it, and made it barren.

According to Julius Pollux's Onomasticon, Minthe was mentioned by the poet Cratinus, an Athenian playwright of the Old Comedy, in his lost play Nomoi ("Laws").

== Culture ==
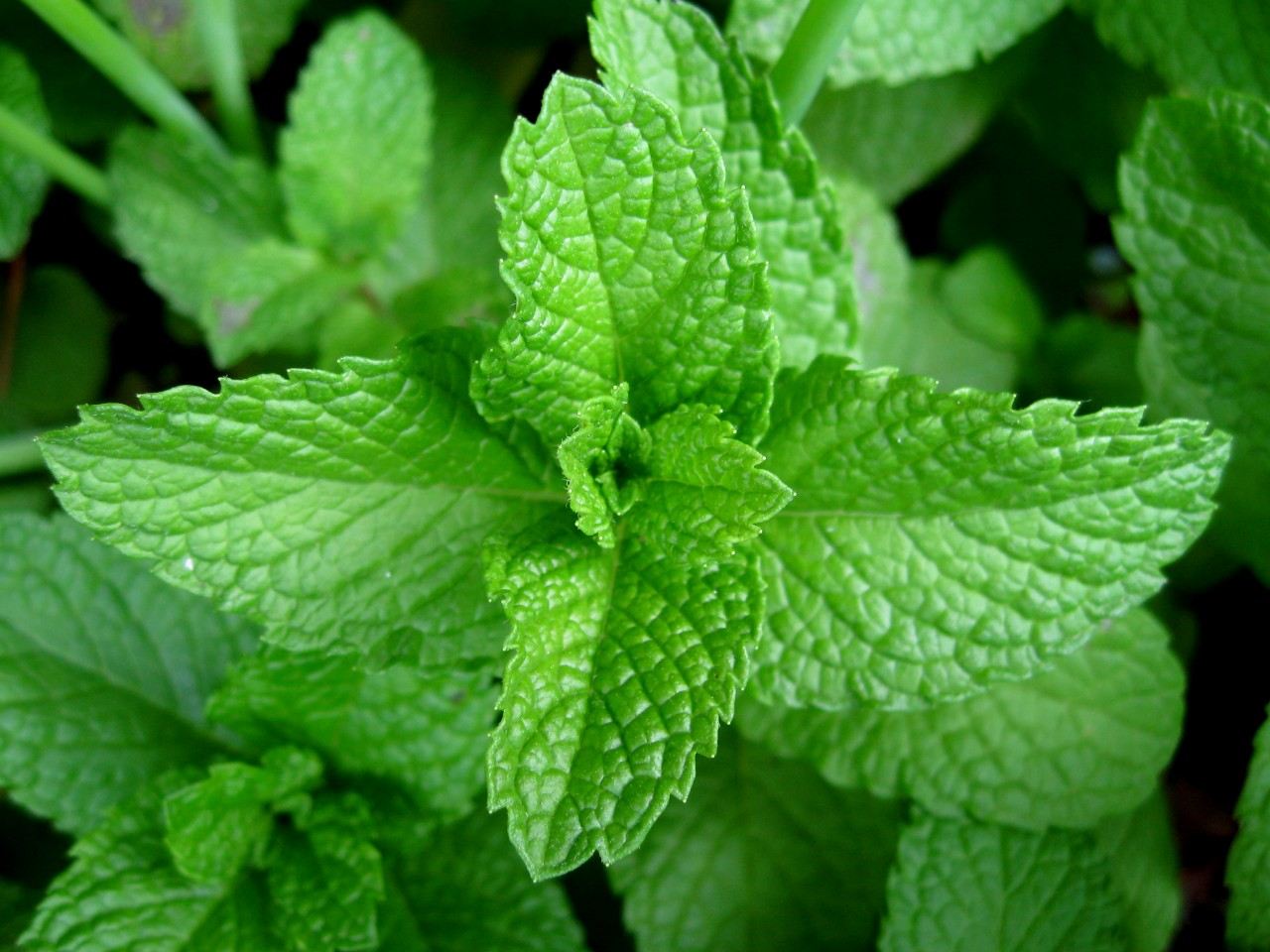
Close-up of mint leaves.

The word used in ancient Greek texts to describe Minthe in relation to her affair with Hades is παλλακή (pallakḗ), translating to 'concubine' or 'young girl'. In ancient Greek culture, a pallake referred to a man's unmarried consort; she was of lower status than a legally married wife, but stood higher than a common prostitute or a hetaira.

In ancient Greece, mint was used in funerary rites, together with rosemary and myrtle, and not simply to offset the smell of decay; mint was an element in the fermented barley drink called the kykeon that was an essential preparatory entheogen for participants in the Eleusinian Mysteries, which offered hope in the afterlife for initiates. Minthe might have originated from Demeter's mystery cults, alongside figures like Baubo and the daughters of Celeus. On the other hand, it has been argued that the myth is of Hellenistic (323 BC to 31 BC) origin instead. It is probable that it emerged as a local story at Hades's shrine near Mount Minthe due to some special connection between the plant and the god.

The mint was highly valued due to its aromatic properties and its capacity as a condiment that brings out the flavour of many foods. Mint was used as an appetising spice, for perfume-making, woven in wreaths, and it would be hung up in rooms in order to improve and fresh up the air. It also was regarded as a powerful aphrodisiac, hence Minthe's role in becoming the lover of Hades; at the same time it was used as a contraceptive method, as it was believed that consuming it before the act would prevent a pregnancy. Thus the mint, a plant of sterility, was seen as the opponent of Demeter, the goddess of fertility, argues Detienne. Forbes Irving meanwhile disagrees with this interpretation, as Minthe's connection to Demeter is already established via the kykeon, and while it is true that Hades and Minthe's relationship is a barren one, since no children are produced from the couple, the same is true for Hades and Persephone's. The pomegranate fruit, central to the myth of Hades and Persephone's marriage, was also both a fertility symbol and a birth control method just like the mint.

== See also ==
- Adonis
- Leuce
- Leucothoe
- Niobe
- Psalacantha
- Zeus and Hera
