= Hades =

God of the underworld in Greek mythology

- King of the underworld; God of the dead and riches
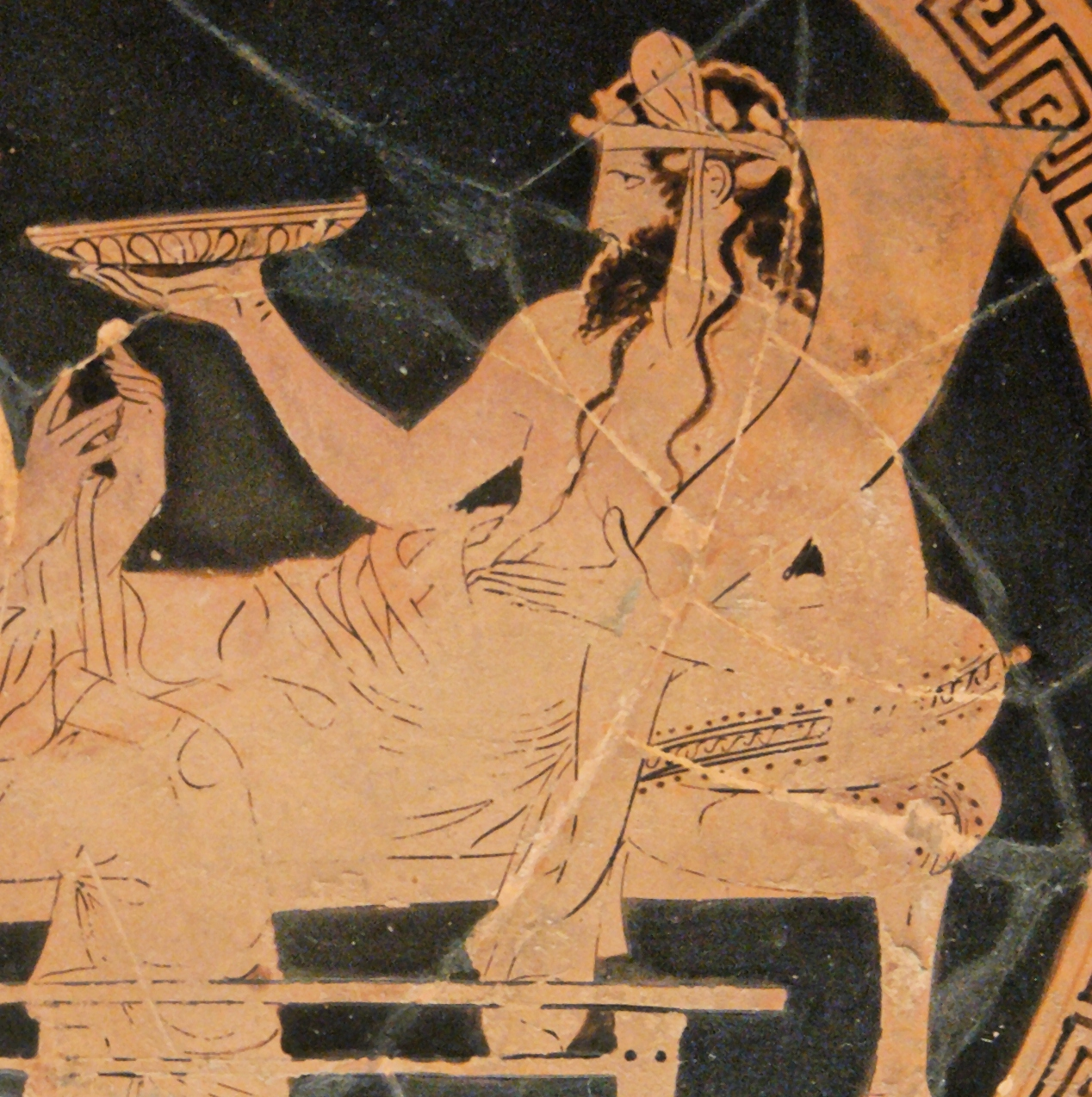
- Hades, bare-chested and holding a phiale and empty horn, is shown lying on a couch. Tondo of a red-figure kylix from Vulci, c. 430–420 BC
- Abode: Greek underworld
- Symbol: Cypress, Narcissus, keys, serpent, mint plant, dog, chariot

Genealogy
- Parents: Cronus and Rhea
- Siblings: Poseidon, Demeter, Hestia, Hera, Zeus
- Consort: Persephone

Equivalents
- Roman: Dis Pater

Hades (/ˈheɪdiːz/; Ancient Greek: ᾍδης, romanised: Hā́idēs, Attic Greek: [háːi̯dεːs], later [háːdeːs]), in the ancient Greek religion and mythology, is the god of the dead and riches and the King of the underworld, with which his name became synonymous. Hades was the eldest son of Cronus and Rhea, although this also made him the last son to be regurgitated by his father. He and his brothers, Zeus and Poseidon, defeated, overthrew, and replaced their father's generation of gods, the Titans, and claimed joint sovereignty over the cosmos. Hades received the underworld, Zeus the sky, and Poseidon the sea, with the solid earth, which was long the domain of Gaia, available to all three concurrently.

Roman-era mythographers eventually equated the Etruscan god Aita, and the Roman gods Dis Pater and Orcus, with Hades, and merged all these figures into Pluto, a Latinisation of Plouton (Ancient Greek: Πλούτων, romanised: Ploútōn), itself a euphemistic title (meaning "the rich one") often given to Hades.

== Name ==
The origin of Hades's name is uncertain but has generally been seen as meaning "the unseen one" since antiquity. An extensive section of Plato's dialogue Cratylus is devoted to the etymology of the god's name, in which Socrates is arguing for a folk etymology not from "unseen" but from "his knowledge (eidenai) of all noble things". Modern linguists have proposed the Proto-Greek form *Awides ("unseen"). The earliest attested form is Aḯdēs (Ἀΐδης), which lacks the proposed digamma. Martin Litchfield West argues instead for an original meaning of "the one who presides over meeting up" from the universality of death.

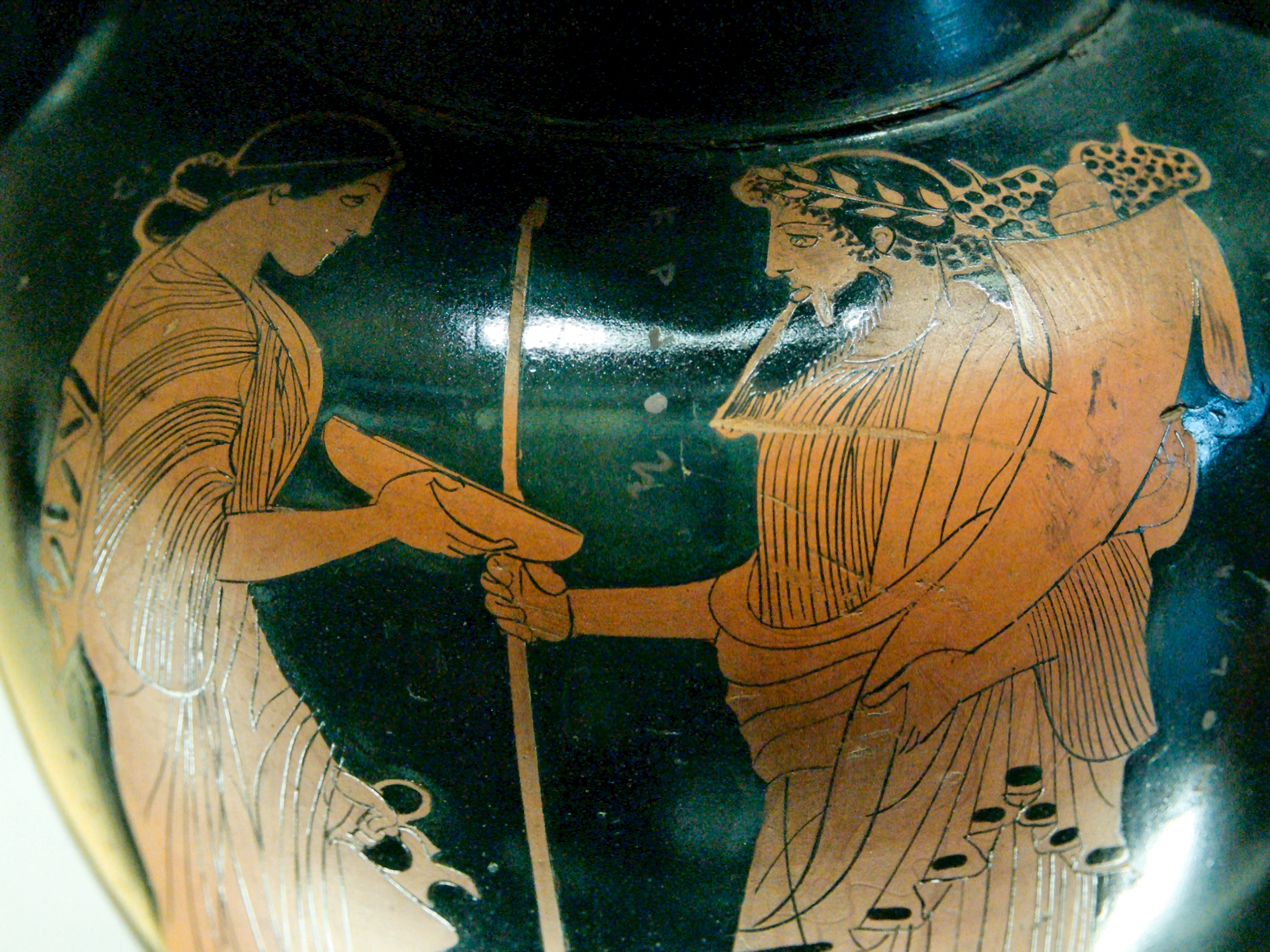
Hades (right) and Persephone (left). Detail from an Attic red-figure amphora, c. 470 BC. From Italy

In Homeric and Ionic Greek, he was known as Áïdēs. Other poetic variations of the name include Aïdōneús (Ἀϊδωνεύς) and the inflected forms Áïdos (Ἄϊδος, gen.), Áïdi (Ἄϊδι, dat.), and Áïda (Ἄϊδα, acc.), whose reconstructed nominative case *Áïs (*Ἄϊς) is, however, not attested. The name as it came to be known in classical times was Háidēs (Ἅιδης). Later the iota became silent, then a subscript marking (ᾍδης), and finally omitted entirely (Άδης).

Perhaps from fear of pronouncing his name, around the 5th century BC, the Greeks started referring to Hades as Plouton (Πλούτων, Ploútōn, [ˈpluː.tɔːn]), with a root meaning "wealthy", considering that from the abode below (i.e., the soil) come riches (e.g., fertile crops, metals and so on). Plouton became the Roman god who both rules the underworld and distributed riches from below. This deity was a mixture of the Greek god Hades and the Eleusinian icon Ploutos, and from this he also received a priestess, which was not previously practiced in Greece. More elaborate names of the same genre were Ploutodótēs (Πλουτοδότης, [pluː.toˈdo.tεːs]) or Ploutodotḗr (Πλουτοδοτήρ, [pluː.to.doˈtεːr]), meaning "giver of wealth".

Epithets of Hades include Agesander (Ἀγήσανδρος, [aˈgεː.san.dros]) and Agesilaos (Ἀγεσίλαος, [a.geˈsi.la.os]), both from ágō (ἄγω, "lead", "carry" or "fetch") and anḗr (ἀνήρ, "man") or laos (λαός, "men" or "people"), describing Hades as the god who carries away all. Nicander uses the form Hegesilaus (Ἡγεσίλαος, [hεː.geˈsi.la.os]).

He was also referred to as Zeus katachthonios (Ζεὺς καταχθόνιος, [zdeu̯s ka.taˈkʰtʰo.ni.os]), meaning "the Zeus of the underworld", by those avoiding his actual name, as he had complete control over the underworld.

== Mythology ==
=== Early years ===
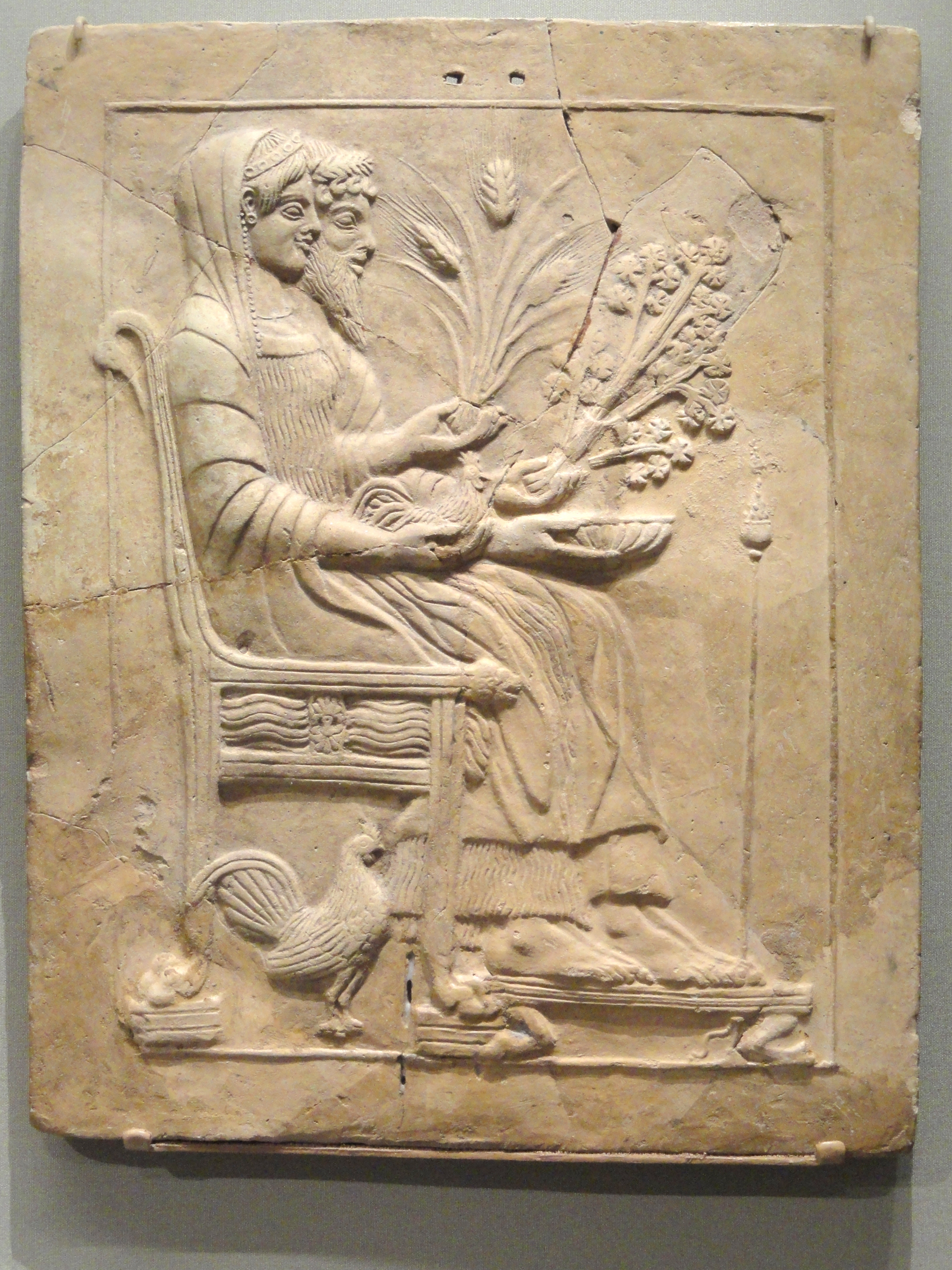
Pinax with Persephone and Hades Enthroned, 500–450 BC, Greek, Locri Epizephirii, Mannella district, Sanctuary of Persephone, terracotta – Cleveland Museum of Art

In Greek mythology, Hades, the god of the Greek underworld, was the first-born son of the Titans Cronus and Rhea. He had three older sisters, Hestia, Demeter, and Hera, as well as a younger brother, Poseidon, all of whom had been swallowed whole by their father as soon as they were born. Zeus was the youngest child and through the machinations of their mother, Rhea, he was the only one that had escaped this fate. Upon reaching adulthood, Zeus managed to force his father to disgorge his siblings. After their release, the six younger gods, along with allies they managed to gather, challenged the elder gods for power in the Titanomachy, a divine war. Armed with the helm of invisibility forged for him by the Cyclopes, Hades with his siblings and other divine allies defeated the Titans and became rulers in their place. The war lasted for ten years and ended with the victory of the younger gods. Following their victory, according to a single famous passage in the Iliad (Book XV, ln.187–93), Hades and his two brothers, Poseidon and Zeus, drew lots for realms to rule. Zeus received the sky, Poseidon received the seas, and Hades received the underworld, the unseen realm to which the souls of the dead go upon leaving the world as well as any and all things beneath the earth.

Hades obtained his wife and queen, Persephone, through abduction at the behest of Zeus. This myth is the most important one Hades takes part in; it also connected the Eleusinian Mysteries with the Olympian pantheon, particularly as represented in the Homeric Hymn to Demeter, which is the oldest story of the abduction, most likely dating back to the beginning of the 6th century BC. Helios told the grieving Demeter that Hades was not an unworthy groom or son-in-law (Note: The word used in the ancient text, γαμβρός, translates to both "son-in-law" and "bridegroom".) given his status among the gods, as her own brother and king on his own right:

But, Goddess, give up your strong grief; let go
of your infinite anger. Hades isn't an unsuitable
son-in-law among the gods: Lord of the Many Dead,
your own brother from the same seed. As for honor,
he won the third share back when the division was made
and now lives among those whom he was allotted to rule."

— Homeric Hymn to Demeter 82–86

=== King of the underworld ===
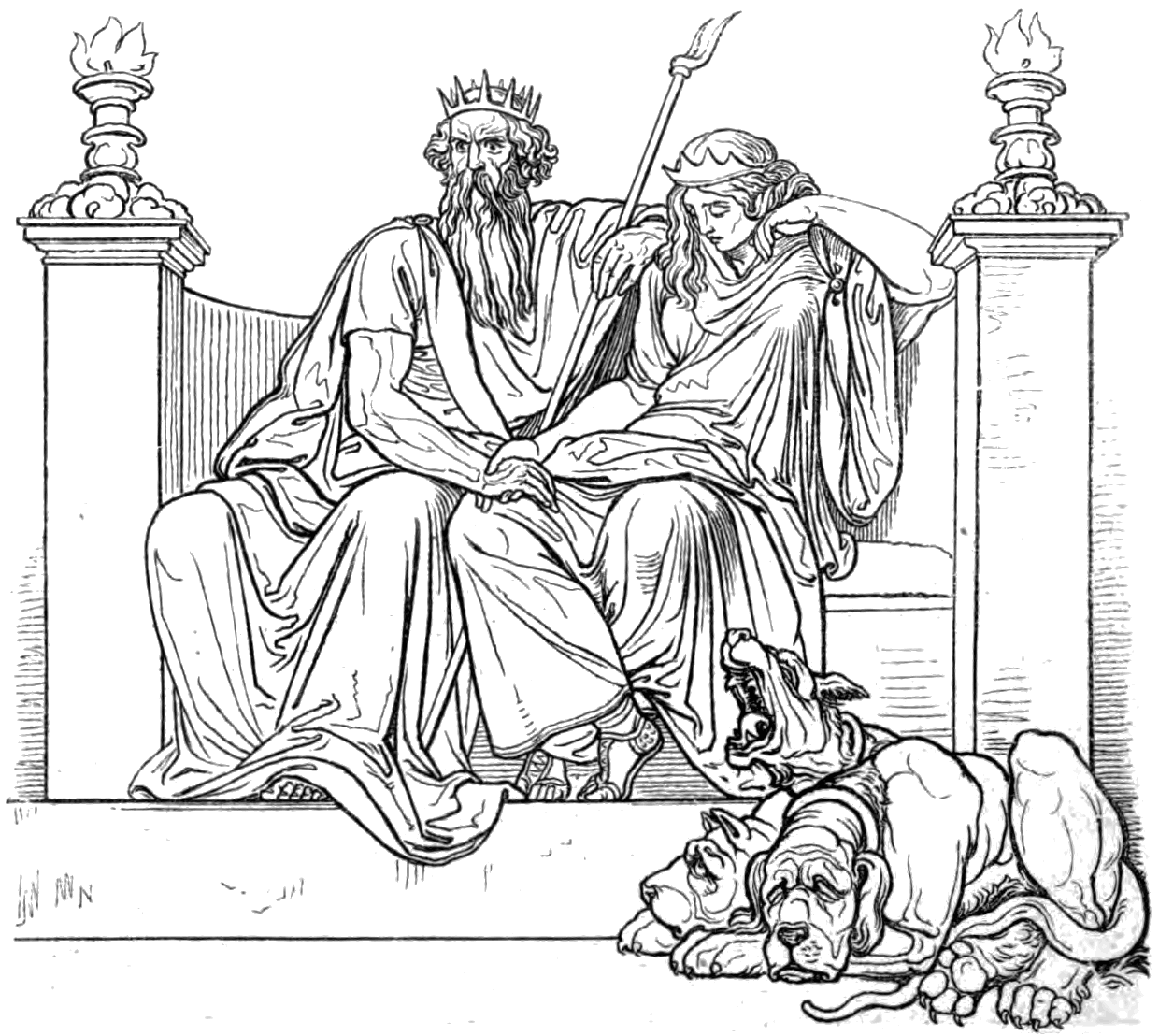
Hades and Persephone, 1864

Despite connotations of death as evil, Hades was more altruistically inclined in Platonic philosophy. Hades was portrayed as passive and seldom portrayed negatively; his role was often maintaining relative balance. That said, he was also depicted as ruthless, hateful, and stern, and he held all of his subjects equally accountable to his laws. He was the key-holding jailor, the souls of the dead were his prisoners. Any other individual aspects of his personality are not given, as Greeks refrained from giving him much thought to avoid attracting his attention.

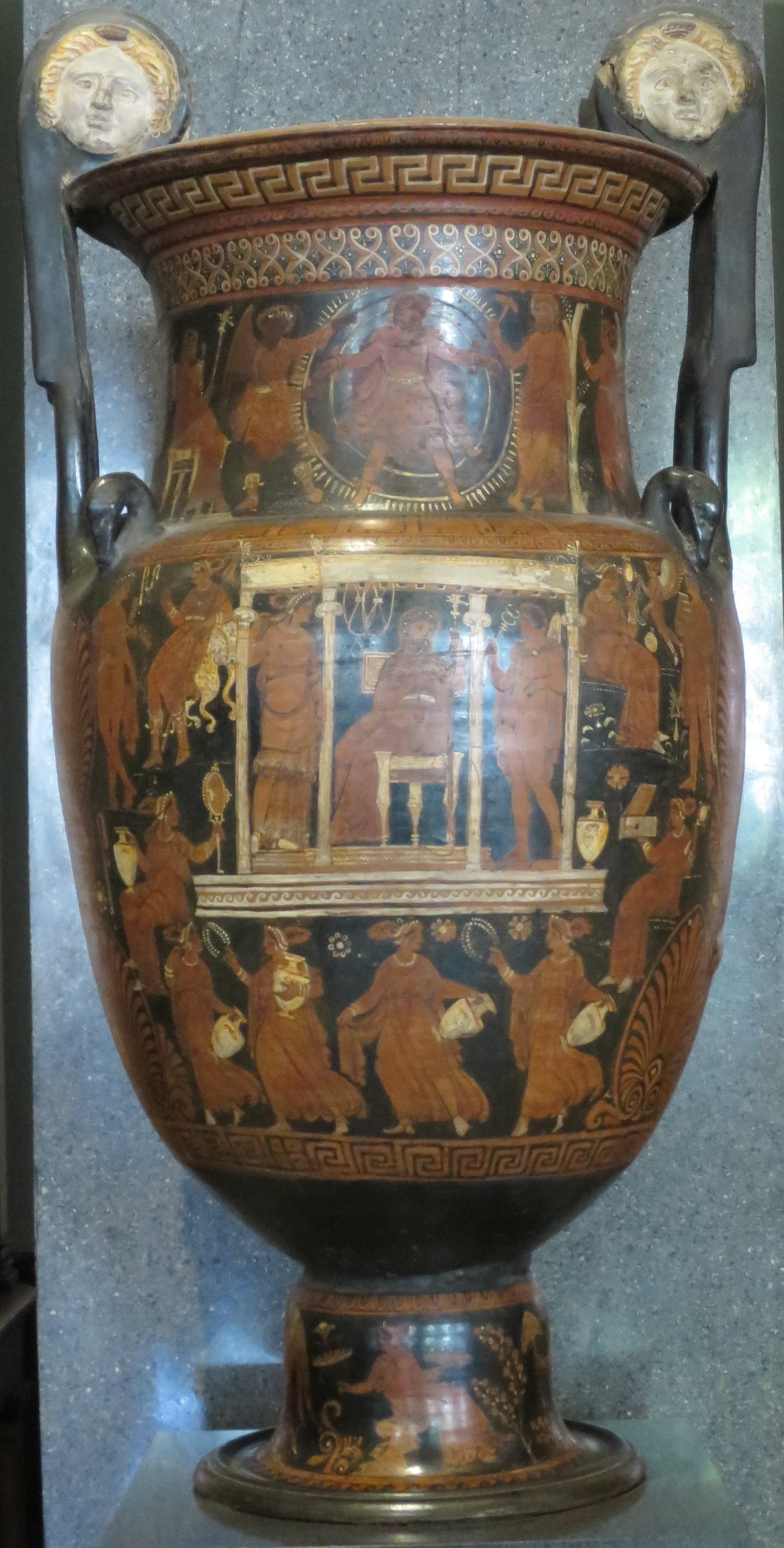
Red figure volute krater with scene of the underworld, follower of the Baltimore Painter, Hermitage

Hades ruled the dead, assisted by others over whom he had complete authority. The House of Hades was described as full of "guests", though he rarely left the underworld. He cared little about what happened in the world above, as his primary attention was ensuring none of his subjects ever left his domain.

He strictly forbade his subjects to leave his domain and would become quite enraged when anyone tried to leave, or if someone tried to steal the souls from his realm. His wrath was equally terrible for anyone who tried to cheat death or otherwise crossed him, as Sisyphus and Pirithous found out to their sorrow. While usually indifferent to his subjects, Hades was very focused on the punishment of these two people; particularly Pirithous, as he entered the underworld in an attempt to steal Persephone for himself, and consequently was forced onto the "Chair of Forgetfulness". Another myth is about the Greek god Asclepius, who was originally a demigod, son of Apollo and Coronis, a Thessalian princess. During his lifetime, he became a famous and talented physician, who eventually was able to bring the dead back to life. Feeling cheated, Hades persuaded Zeus to kill him with a thunderbolt. After his death, Asclepius was brought to Olympus where he became a god. Hades was only depicted outside of the underworld once in myth, and even that is believed to have been an instance where he had just left the gates of the underworld, which was when Heracles shot him with an arrow as Hades was attempting to defend the city of Pylos. After he was shot, however, he traveled to Olympus to heal. Besides Heracles, the only other living people, who ventured to the underworld, were also heroes: Odysseus, Aeneas (accompanied by the Sibyl), Theseus with Pirithous, Psyche (in a late romance), and Orpheus, to whom Hades showed uncharacteristic mercy at Persephone's urging, who was moved by Orpheus's music. None of them were pleased with what they witnessed in the realm of the dead. In particular, the Greek war hero Achilles, whom Odysseus conjured with a blood libation, said:

O shining Odysseus, never try to console me for dying.
I would rather follow the plow as thrall to another
man, one with no land allotted to him and not much to live on,
than be a king over all the perished dead.

— Achilles's soul to Odysseus. Homer, Odyssey 11.488–491 (Lattimore translation)

=== Abduction of Persephone ===
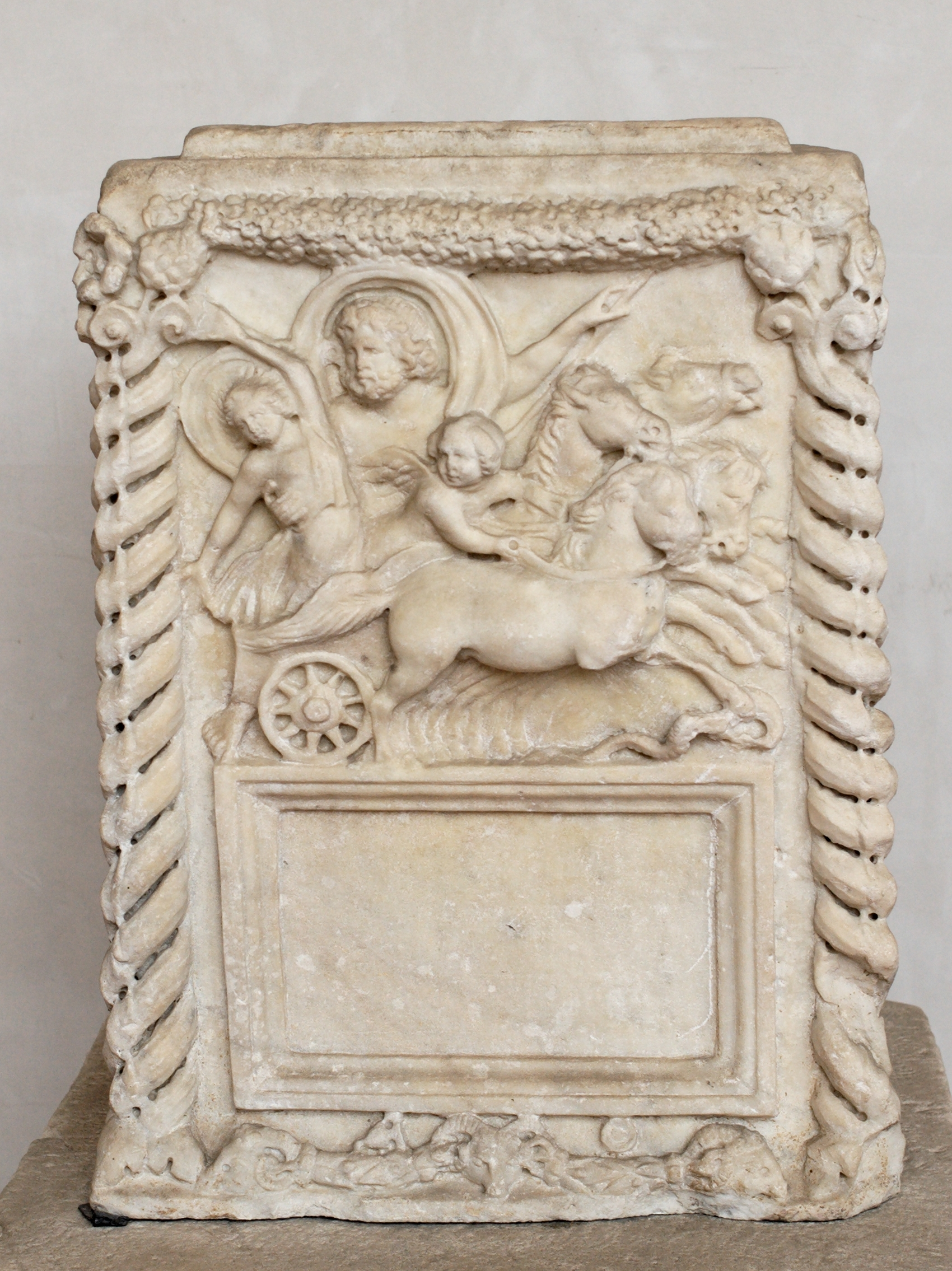
Cinerary altar with tabula representing the rape of Proserpina. White marble, Antonine Era, 2nd century CE.

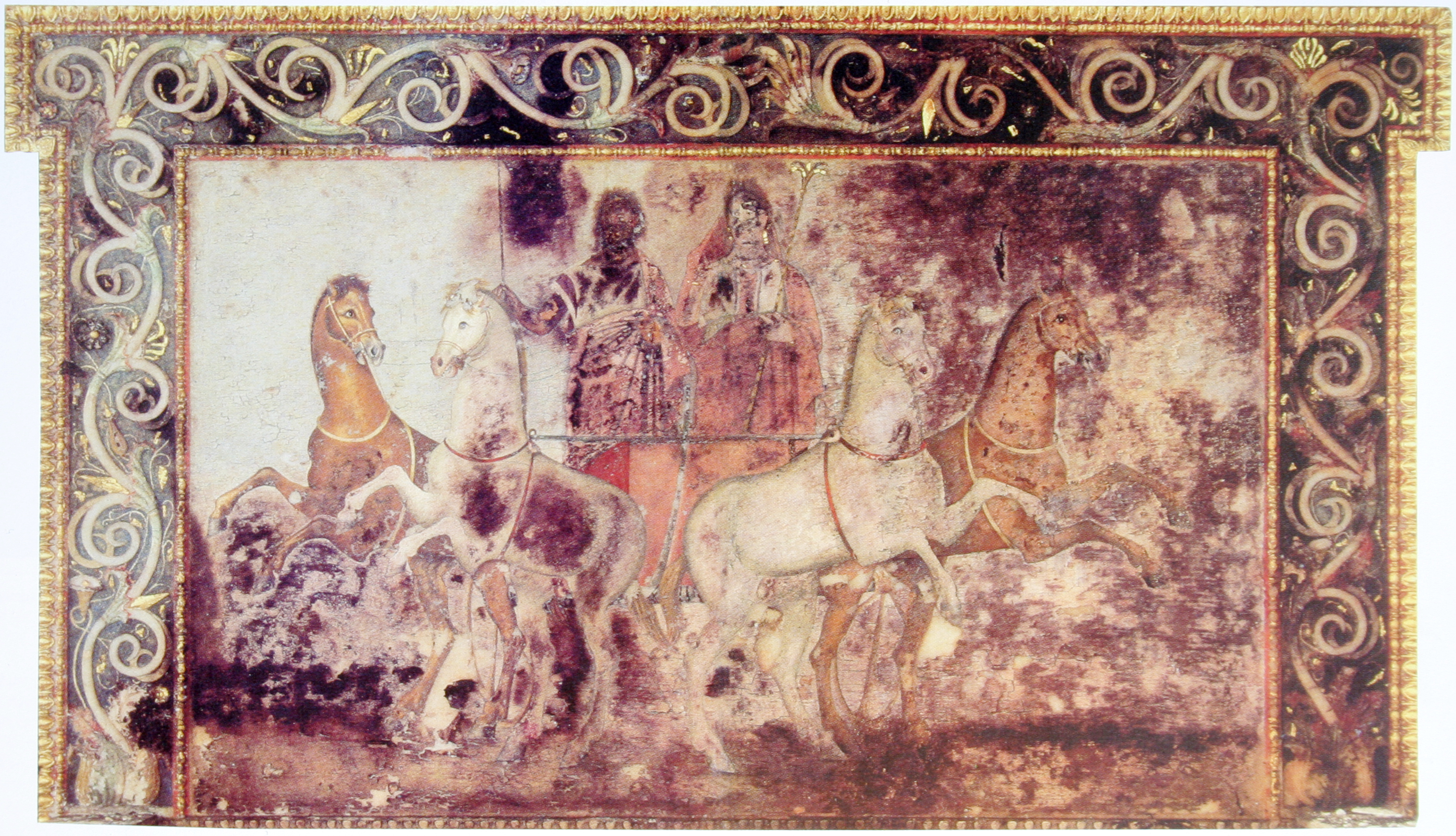
A fresco showing Hades and Persephone riding in a chariot, from the tomb of Queen Eurydice I of Macedon at Vergina, Greece, 4th century BC

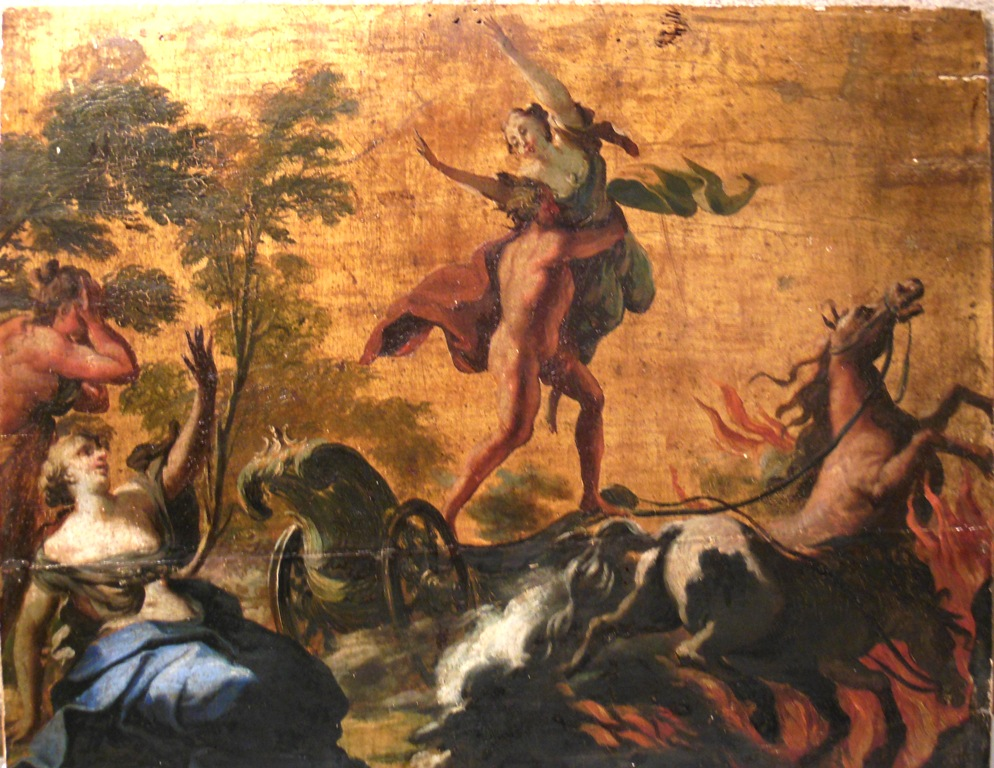
Oil painting of Hades abducting Persephone. 18th Century. Oil on wood with gilt background. Property of Missing Link Antiques.

The consort of Hades was Persephone, daughter of Zeus and Demeter. Persephone did not submit to Hades willingly, but was abducted by him while picking flowers in the fields of Nysa (her father, Zeus, had previously given Persephone to Hades, to be his wife, as is stated in the first lines of the Homeric Hymn to Demeter). In protest of his act, Demeter cast a curse on the land and there was a great famine; though, one by one, the gods came to request she lift it, lest mankind perish and cause the gods to be deprived of their receiving gifts and sacrifices, Demeter asserted that the earth would remain barren until she saw her daughter again. Zeus then sends for his son, Hermes, and instructs him to go down to the underworld in hopes that he may be able to convince Hades to allow Persephone to return to Earth, so that Demeter might see Persephone and cause the famine to stop. Hermes obeys and goes down to Hades's realm, wherein he finds Hades seated upon a couch, Persephone seated next to him. Hermes relays Zeus's message, and Hades complies, saying,

Go now, Persephone, to your dark-robed mother, go, and feel kindly in your heart towards me: be not so exceedingly cast down; for I shall be no unfitting husband for you among the deathless gods, that am own brother to father Zeus. And while you are here, you shall rule all that lives and moves and shall have the greatest rights among the deathless gods: those who defraud you and do not appease your power with offerings, reverently performing rites and paying fit gifts, shall be punished for evermore.

— Homeric Hymn to Demeter

Afterwards, Hades readies his chariot, but not before he secretly gives Persephone a pomegranate seed to eat; Hermes takes the reins, and he and Persephone make their way to the Earth above, coming to a halt in front of Demeter's temple at Eleusis, where the goddess has been waiting. Demeter and Persephone run towards each other and embrace one another, happy that they are reunited. Demeter, however, suspects that Persephone may have eaten food while down in the underworld, and so she questions Persephone, saying:

My child, tell me, surely you have not tasted any food while you were below? Speak out and hide nothing, but let us both know. For if you have not, you shall come back from loathly Hades and live with me and your father, the dark-clouded son of Cronos and be honored by all the deathless gods; but if you have tasted food, you must go back again beneath the secret places of the earth, there to dwell a third part of the seasons every year: yet for the two parts you shall be with me and the other deathless gods. But when the earth shall bloom with the fragrant flowers of spring in every kind, then from the realm of darkness and gloom thou shalt come up once more to be a wonder for gods and mortal men. And now tell me how he rapt you away to the realm of darkness and gloom, and by what trick did the strong Host of Many beguile you?

— Homeric Hymn to Demeter

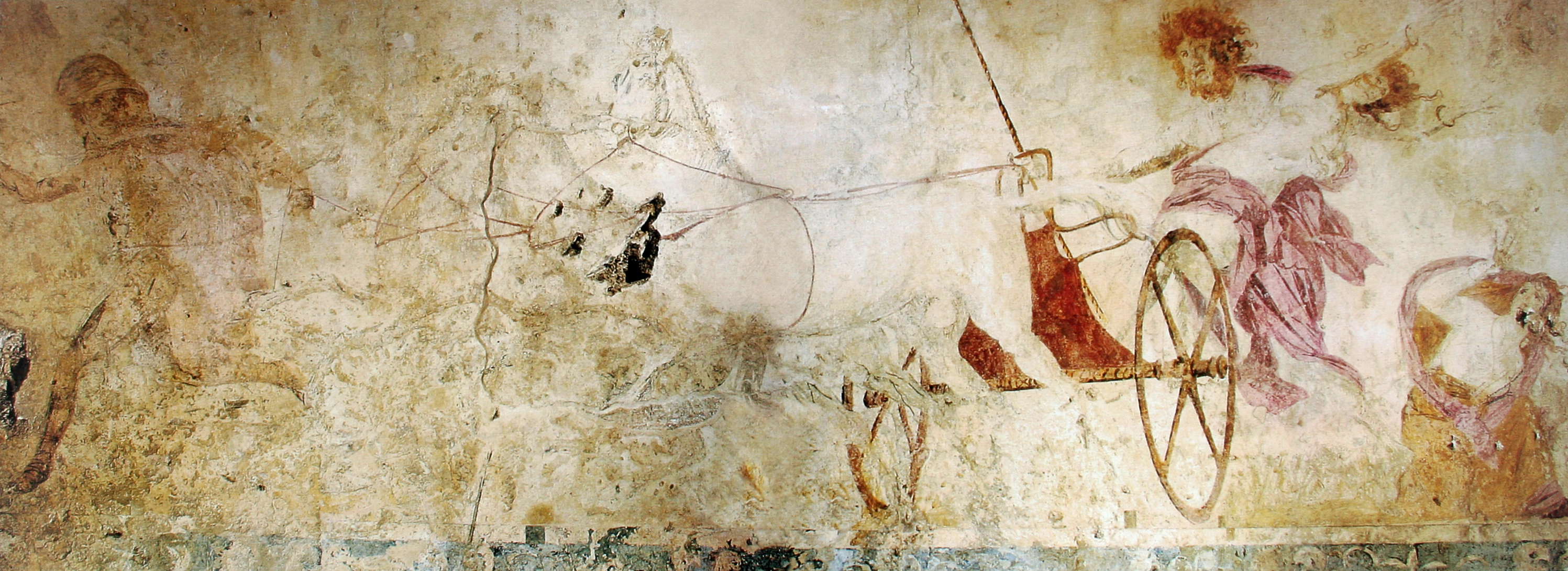
Hades abducting Persephone, fresco in the small Macedonian royal tomb at Vergina, Macedonia, Greece, c. 340 BC

Persephone does admit that she ate the food of the dead, as she tells Demeter that Hades gave her a pomegranate seed and forced her to eat it. Persephone's eating the pomegranate seed binds her to Hades and the underworld, much to the dismay of Demeter. Zeus, however, had previously proposed a compromise, to which all parties had agreed: of the year, Persephone would spend one third with her husband.

It is during this time, when Persephone is down in the underworld with her husband, that winter falls upon the earth, "an aspect of sadness and mourning."

=== Visitors in the underworld ===
The hero Orpheus once descended into the underworld in search of his late wife Eurydice, who died when a snake bit her. So lovely was the music he played that it charmed even Hades (as well as his wife Persephone), who allowed him to take Eurydice to the land of the living, as long as he did not look back at her on his way out.

In another story, Theseus and Pirithous pledged to kidnap and marry daughters of Zeus. Theseus chose Helen and together they kidnapped her and decided to hold onto her until she was old enough to marry. Pirithous chose Persephone. They left Helen with Theseus's mother, Aethra, and traveled to the underworld. Hades knew of their plan to capture his wife, so he pretended to offer them hospitality and set a feast; as soon as the pair sat down, snakes coiled around their feet and held them there. Theseus was eventually rescued by Heracles but Pirithous was either trapped as punishment for daring to seek the wife of a god for his own or killed by Cerberus, depending on the version of the story.

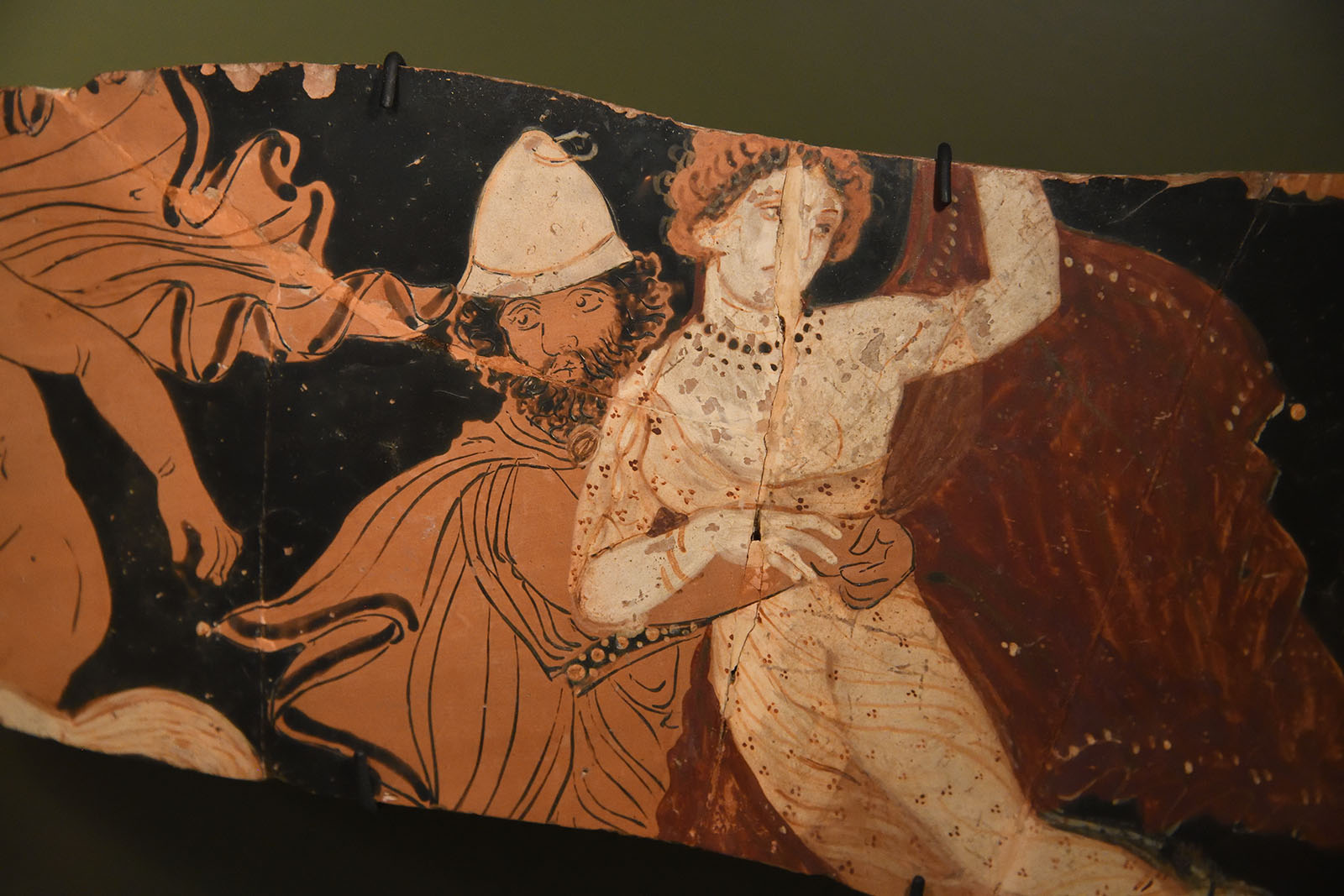
Hades abducts Persephone, pot made and found in Taranto, 350–325 BC

Sisyphus was a mortal king from Corinth who was punished in Tartarus for revealing to the river god Asopus the whereabouts of his daughter Aegina after Zeus abducted her, and for trying to cheat death as well. Zeus, angry at Sisyphus for revealing the secret, sent Thanatos to Sisyphus, but he cleverly cast Death into his own bonds, and as a result no one could die until Ares freed Thanatos and delivered Sisyphus to him. But still, Sisyphus ordered his wife Merope not to perform any funeral rites for him and what else was accustomed as tribute to the underworld gods before he was brought to Hades. After some time that Merope had not offered proper honours, Hades learnt of this, and allowed Sisyphus to return to the world of the living so that he could punish his wife, with the understanding that he would return afterwards. Sisyphus, however, never returned as promised until years later, when he died of old age. Hades punished Sisyphus by making him roll a boulder up a hill in the underworld; but every time he reached the top, the boulder would roll down again and again. In another version, it is Persephone who lets him out.

Heracles's final labour was to capture Cerberus. First, Heracles went to Eleusis to be initiated into the Eleusinian Mysteries. He did this to absolve himself of guilt for killing the centaurs and to learn how to enter and exit the underworld alive. He found the entrance to the underworld at Taenarum. Athena and Hermes helped him through and back from Hades. Heracles asked Hades for permission to take Cerberus. Hades agreed as long as Heracles did not harm Cerberus. When Heracles dragged the dog out of Hades, he passed through the cavern Acherusia. In the myth of Admetus and Alcestis, after Alcestis chose to die in place of her husband Admetus in order to save him, Heracles brought her back from the dead by fighting and defeating Hades. In other versions, like Euripides's play Alcestis, Heracles fought Thanatos instead. At another time, Heracles sieged the town of Pylos and during the fight he wounded Hades, who had sided with the Pylians. In great pain, Hades went to Olympus to be healed by the physician of the gods, Paean.

=== Lovers and children ===
Leuce was the most beautiful of the nymphs and a daughter of Oceanus. Hades fell in love with her and abducted her to the underworld. She lived out the span of her life in his realm, and when she died, the god sought consolation by creating a suitable memorial of their love: in the Elysian Fields where the pious spend their afterlife, he brought a white tree into existence. It was this tree with which Heracles crowned himself to celebrate his return from the underworld.

Minthe was a nymph of the river Cocytus who became Hades's mistress. A jealous Persephone trampled the nymph under her foot, transforming her into garden mint in the process. According to a scholiast on Nicander, Hades turned his dead lover into the mint herb after Persephone tore her into pieces for sleeping with him. In another version, Hades had kept Minthe as his mistress before he married Persephone, and set her aside afterwards. Minthe boasted of being more beautiful than Persephone, and that Hades would soon take her back. In anger over the hubris directed toward her daughter, Demeter trampled Minthe and turned her into mint.

According to a 2nd–1st-century BC funerary epigram from Pantikapaion (in modern-day Crimea), Hades abducted the beautiful girl Theophile, with whom he had become enamoured.

In a fragment of a lost play by the 5th-century BC tragedian Aeschylus, Zagreus is the son of Hades. The 2nd- or 3rd-century AD Orphic Hymns describe Hades as the father of the Eumenides by Persephone, a parentage also attested in two fragments of Orphic literature (that is, lost works attributed to the mythical poet Orpheus). In the Suda, a 10th-century AD Byzantine encyclopaedia, Hades is the father of a figure named Macaria.

=== Other works ===
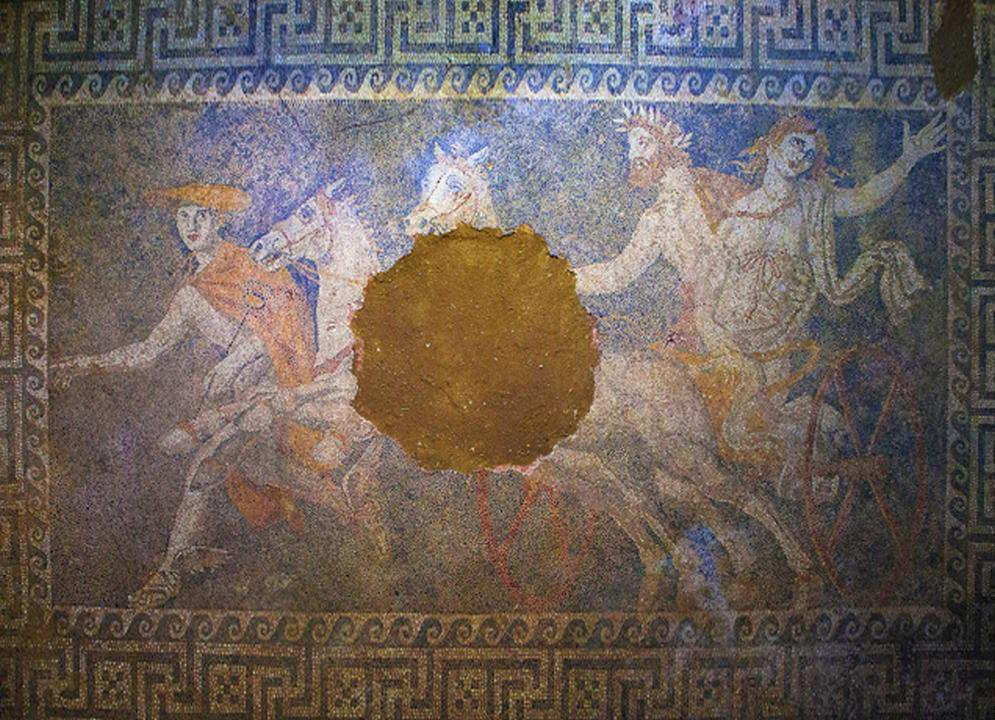
The Abduction of Persephone by Pluto, Amphipolis, Greece.

Once, when a plague hit Aonia, a region in Boeotia, the people consulted an oracle, and the god replied to them that they needed to make an appeal to the gods of the Underworld and sacrifice two willing young maidens to appease the anger of Hades and Persephone. The girls that were chosen were Menippe and Metioche, the daughters of Orion, who solemnly offered their lives in order to save their countrymen. After invoking the chthonic deities three times, they took their own lives with the shuttles of their looms. Hades and Persephone then took pity in both of them, and transformed their corpses into comets.

In some versions Hades is considered the master of the goddesses of Fate, not his brother Zeus and the god who designates the end and origin of all things and orders the alternation of birth and destruction, the arbiter of life and death. This relationship is very clear in Roman epics like Statius's Thebaid, where they are mentioned taking souls to be judged by Hades and inflicting severe punishments or in Claudian's De raptu Proserpinae where they appear begging their master not to release the Titans and saying everything they do is for him, after Hades threatens Zeus to release the Titans against him if he does not give him a wife.

Hades is considered the father of the Furies in some versions, but the mother's identity varies. in Virgil's Aeneid their mother is the night goddess Nyx and in the Orphic Hymns their mother is Persephone by Hades. One of the rare occasions when he appears interacting with them is in Statius's Thebaid, when Hades orders Tisiphone to punish humans for having invaded the underworld. He is said to hate Alecto, even though she is one of his children.

In contrast to many of his other classical representations the satirical author Lucian of Samosata presents Hades in a more positive and even comic way. In his Dialogues of the Dead, he is represented trying to solve problems of some famous mythological figures and one of the most outstanding dialogues is with Protesilaus, one of the Greek heroes killed in the Trojan War. In this conversation Protesilaus asks him to be reunited with his (still living) lover, and brings up as example that Hades did the same for Admetus and Alcestis, Orpheus and Eurydice, and that he himself also knows what being in love is like. Hades is skeptical, but Persephone manages to persuade him.

According to Hesiod, when the monstrous Typhon attacked the Olympian gods, Hades is said to have trembled in fear in the underworld while Zeus fought Typhon above.

In one of Plato's dialogues, Socrates talks about Hades as a figure capable of making everyone fall by his enchantments and that is why no one ever leaves the underworld, including the sirens.

== Cult and epithets ==
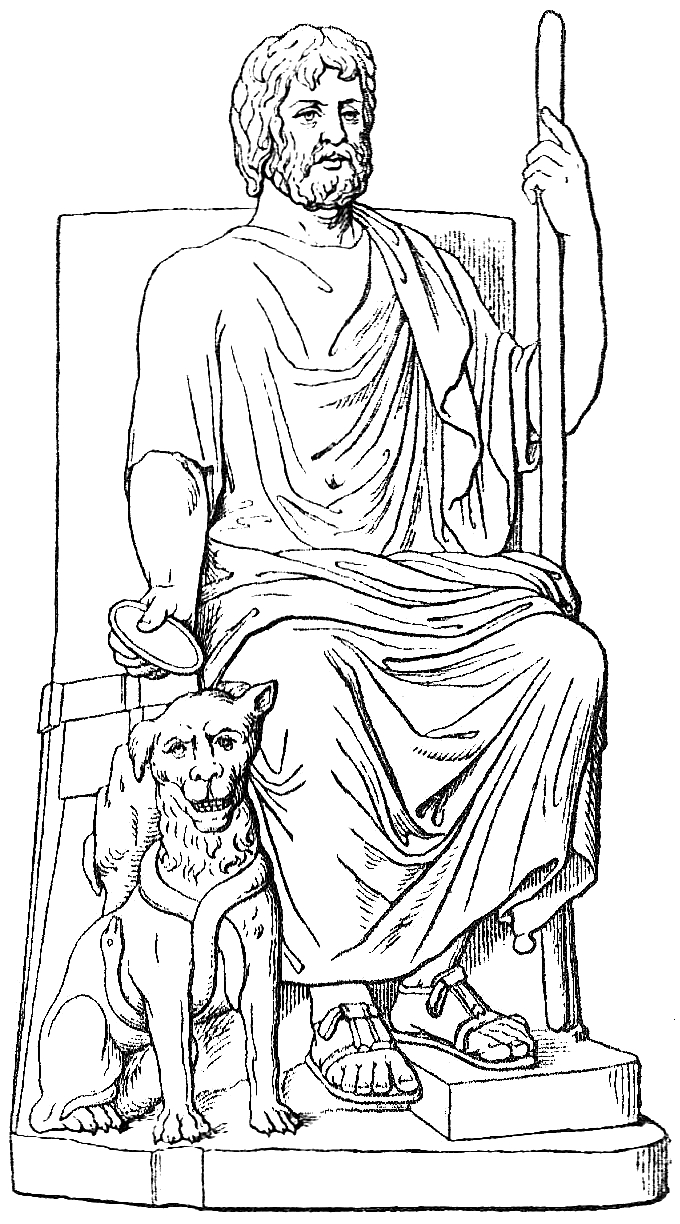
Hades and Cerberus, in Meyers Konversationslexikon, 1888

Hades, as the god of the dead, was a fearsome figure to those still living; in no hurry to meet him, they were reluctant to swear oaths in his name, and averted their faces when sacrificing to him. Since to many, simply to say the word "Hades" was frightening, euphemisms were pressed into use. Since precious minerals come from under the earth (i.e., the "underworld" ruled by Hades), he was considered to have control of these as well, and as such the Greeks referred to him as Πλούτων (Greek Plouton; Latin PLVTO, Pluto, "the rich one"). This title is derived from the word Ploutos (Ancient Greek: Πλοῦτος, romanised: Ploútos, lit. 'wealth, riches', [ˈpluː.tos]). Sophocles explained the notion of referring to Hades as Plouton with these words: "the gloomy Hades enriches himself with our sighs and our tears." In addition, he was called Clymenus (Κλύμενος, Klýmenos, 'infamous', [ˈkly.me.nos]), Polydegmon (Πολυδέγμων, Polydégmon, 'host of many', [po.lyˈdeg.mɔːn]), and perhaps Eubuleus (Εὐβουλεύς, Eubouleús, 'good counsel', [eu̯.buːˈleu̯s]), all of them euphemisms for a name that was unsafe to pronounce, which evolved into epithets.

He spent most of the time in his dark realm. Formidable in battle, he proved his ferocity in the famous Titanomachy, the battle of the Olympians versus the Titans, which established the rule of Zeus.

Feared and loathed, Hades embodied the inexorable finality of death: "Why do we loathe Hades more than any god, if not because he is so adamantine and unyielding?" The rhetorical question is Agamemnon's. Hades was not, however, an evil god, for although he was stern, cruel, and unpitying, he was still just. Hades ruled the underworld and was therefore most often associated with death and feared by men, but he was not Death itself — it is Thanatos, son of Nyx and Erebus, who is the actual personification of death, although Euripides's play "Alkestis" states fairly clearly that Thanatos and Hades were one and the same deity, and gives an interesting description of Hades as being dark-cloaked and winged.

When the Greeks propitiated Hades, they banged their hands on the ground to be sure he would hear them. Black animals, such as sheep, were sacrificed to him. While some suggest the very vehemence of the rejection of human sacrifice expressed in myth might imply an unspoken memory of some distant past, there is no direct evidence of such a turn. The blood from all chthonic sacrifices including those to propitiate Hades dripped into a pit or cleft in the ground. The person who offered the sacrifice had to avert his face.

One ancient source says that he possessed the Cap of invisibility. His chariot, drawn by four black horses, made for a fearsome and impressive sight. These beasts were variously named as, according to Claudian: Orphnaeus, Aethon, Nycteus and Alastor while other authors listed also: Nonius, Ametheus, Abastor, Abetor and Metheus. His other ordinary attributes were the narcissus and cypress plants, and the Key of Hades. In certain portraits, snakes also appeared to be attributed to Hades as he was occasionally portrayed to be either holding them or accompanied by them. This is believed to hold significance as in certain classical sources Hades ravished Kore in the guise of a snake, who went on to give birth to Zagreus-Dionysus. While bearing the name 'Zeus', Zeus Olympios, the great king of the gods, noticeably differs from the Zeus Meilichios, a decidedly chthonian character, often portrayed as a snake, and as seen beforehand, they cannot be different manifestations of the same god, in fact whenever 'another Zeus' is mentioned, this always refers to Hades. Zeus Meilichios and Zeus Eubouleus are often referred to as being alternate names for Hades.

The philosopher Heraclitus, unifying opposites, declared that Hades and Dionysus, the very essence of indestructible life (zoë), are the same god. Among other evidence, Karl Kerényi notes in his book that the Homeric Hymn To Demeter, votive marble images, and epithets all link Hades to being Dionysus. He also notes that the grieving goddess Demeter refused to drink wine, as she states that it would be against themis for her to drink wine, which is the gift of Dionysus, after Persephone's abduction, because of this association; indicating that Hades may in fact have been a "cover name" for the underworld Dionysus. He suggests that this dual identity may have been familiar to those who came into contact with the Mysteries. Dionysus also shared several epithets with Hades such as Chthonios ("the subterranean"), Eubouleus ("Good Counselor"), and Euclius ("glorious" or "renowned") .

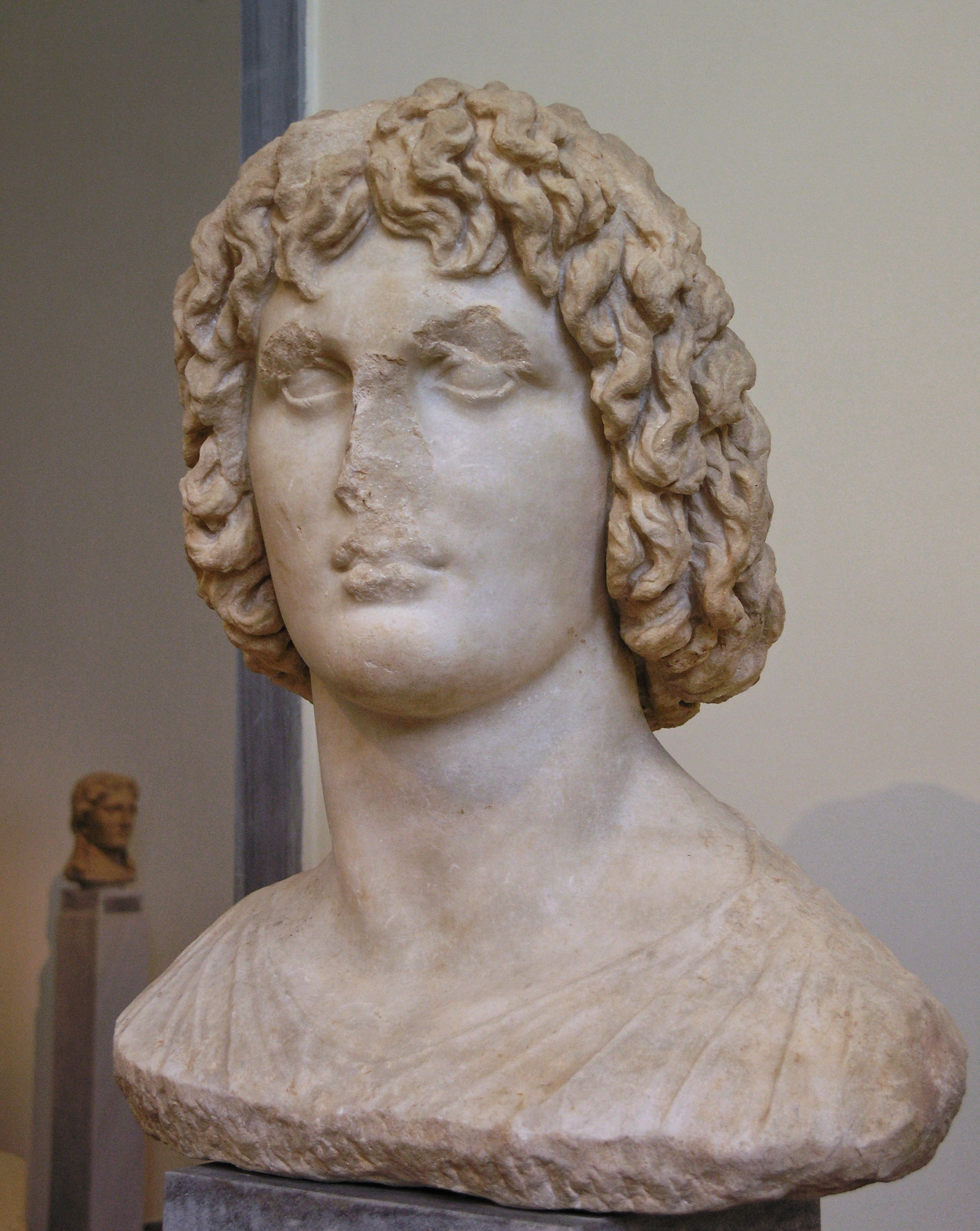
Bust of Eubuleus in the National Archaeological Museum of Athens.

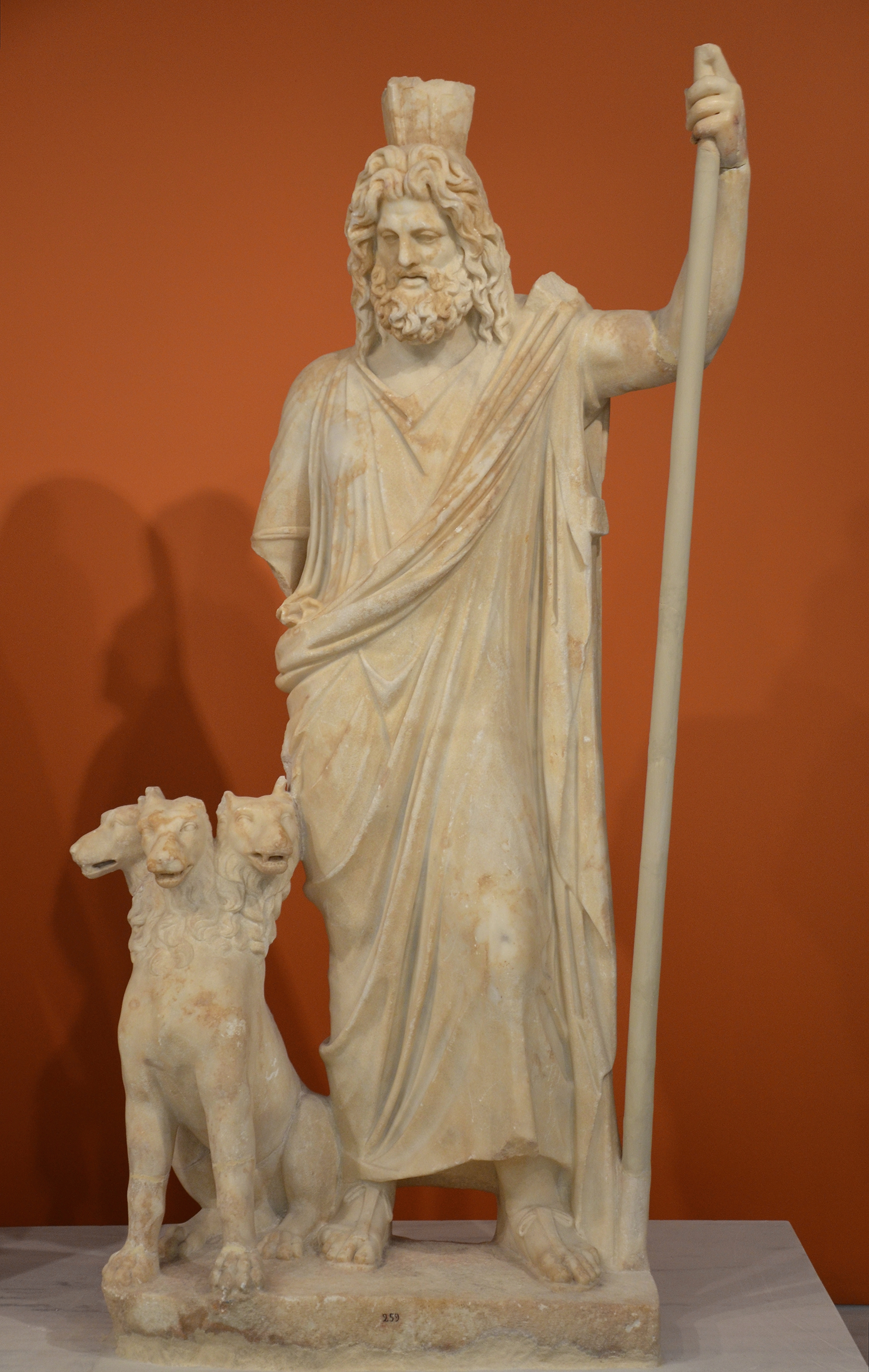
Hades/Serapis with Cerberus, mid-2nd century AD statue from the Sanctuary of the Egyptian Gods at Gortyna

Evidence for a cult connection is quite extensive, particularly in southern Italy, especially when considering the death symbolism included in Dionysian worship; statues of Dionysus found in the Ploutonion at Eleusis gives further evidence as the statue bears a striking resemblance to the statue of Eubouleus also known as the youthful depiction of the Lord of the underworld. The statue of Eubouleus is described as being radiant but disclosing a strange inner darkness. The Orphics believed that Zeus and Hades were the same deity and portrayed them as such.

Among the other appellations under which Hades or Pluto is generally known, are the following:

In Greek:

- Adesius, his name in Latium. It is expressive of the grace.
- Agelastus, from his melancholy countenance.
- Agesilaus, expressive of his attracting all people to his empire.
- Agetes or Hegetes, a name assigned to him by Pindar, as to one who conducts.
- Aidoneus, as used by Plutarch in a euhemerised version of the story of Pirithous's failed abduction of Persephone in which the god is recast as a king of the Molossians.
- Axiocersus, or the shorn god, a name of Pluto in the mysteries of the Cabiri: he was there represented as without hair.
- Iao, his name at Clares, a town of Ionia.
- Moiragetes, his name as guide of the Fates.
- Ophieus, his name as the blind god among the Messenians: it was derived from their dedicating certain Augurs to him, whom they deprived of sight at the moment of their birth.

In Latin or Etruscan:

- Altor, from alo, to nourish.
- Februus, from Februa, signifying the sacrifices and purifications adopted in funeral rites.
- Feralis Deus, the dismal or cruel god.
- Lactum, his name among the Sarmatians.
- Larthy Tytiral, sovereign of Tartarus, his name in Etruria.
- Mantus or Manus, the diminutive of Summanus, an Etruscan epithet.
- Niger Deus, black god, his epithet as god of the Infernal Regions.
- Opertus, the concealed.
- Postulio, a name assigned to him by Varro, under which he was worshipped on the shores of the lake Curtius, from the circumstance of the earth's having opened at that spot, and of the Aruspices having presumed that the King of Death thus asked for (postula, I ask,) sacrifices.
- Profundus Jupiter, deep or lower Jove, from his being sovereign of the deep, or infernal regions.
- Quietalis, from quies, rest.
- Rusor, because all things return eventually to the earth.
- Salutaris Divus, a name assigned to him when he restored the dead to life. Whenever the gods wished to re-animate a body, Pluto let fail some drops of nectar from his urn upon the favoured person: this may account for his being sometimes represented with an inverted vase.
- Saturnius, from his father Saturn.
- Soranus, his name among the Sabines, in the temple dedicated to him on Mount Soracte.
- Stygius, from the river Styx.
- Summanus, from summus manium, prince of the dead.
- Tellumo, a name derived from those treasures which Pluto possesses in the recesses of the earth. Tellumo denotes (according to Varro) the creative power of the earth, in opposition to Tellus the productive.
- Uragus, expressive of his power over fire.
- Urgus, from urgeo, to impel.

In Egypt:

- Amenthes, a name of Pluto among the Egyptians. Plutarch informs us, that the word Amenthes has a reference to the doctrines of the metempsychosis, and signifies the "place which gives and receives";' on the belief that some vast gulf was assigned as a receptacle to the souls, which were about to animate new bodies.

== Artistic representations ==
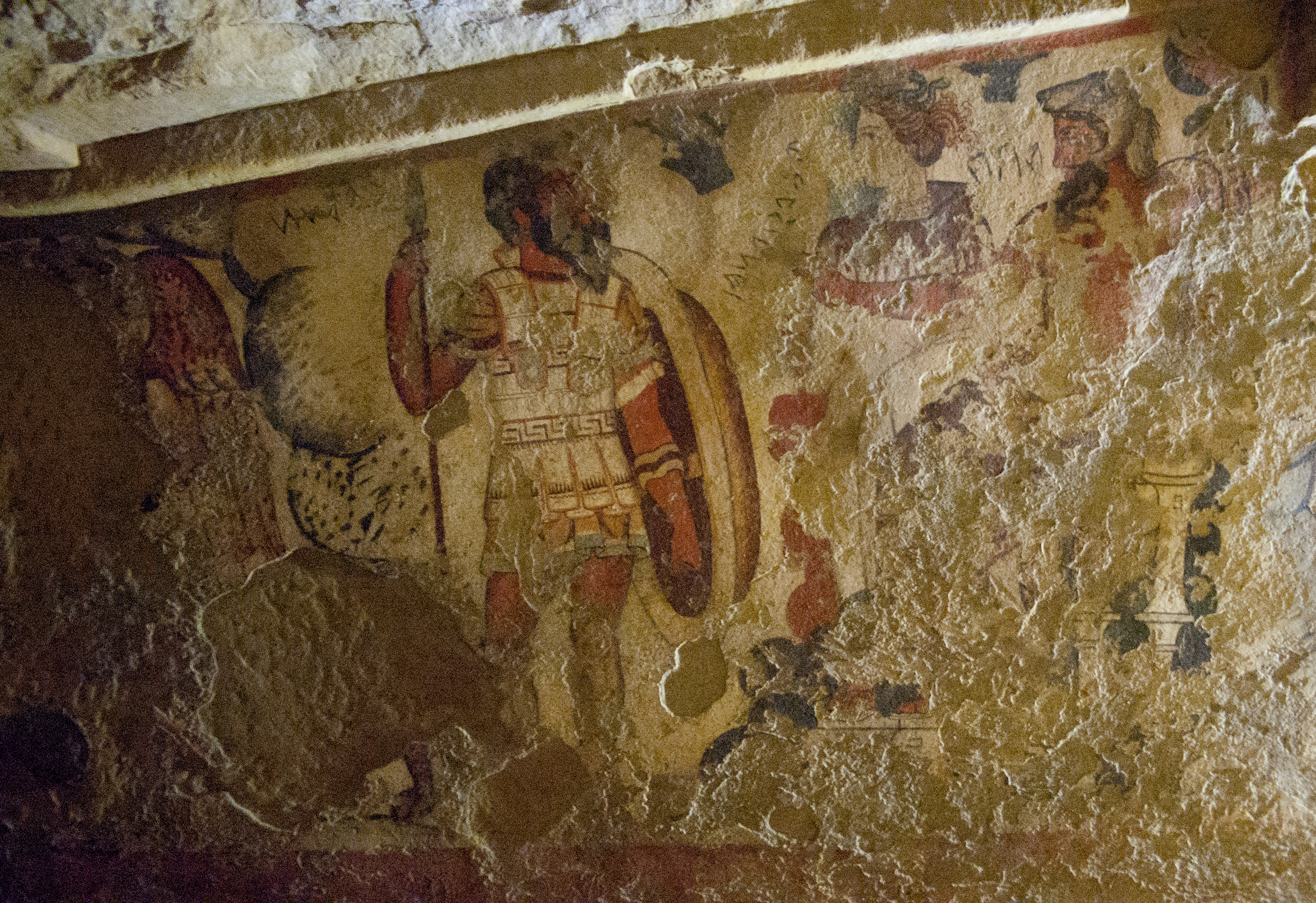
Fresco of Hades and Persephone, Tomb of Orcus II, Montarozzi, Tarquinia, 4th century BC

Hades was depicted infrequently in artwork, as well as mythology, because the Greeks were so afraid of him. His artistic representations, which are generally found in Archaic pottery, are not even concretely thought of as the deity; however at this point in time it is heavily believed that the figures illustrated are indeed Hades. He was later presented in the classical arts in the depictions of the Rape of Persephone. Within these illustrations, Hades was often young, yet he was also shown as varying ages in other works. Due to this lack of depictions, there were not very strict guidelines when representing the deity. On pottery, he has a dark beard and is presented as a stately figure on an "ebony throne." His attributes in art include scepters, cornucopias, roosters, and a key. The key plays a doubly symbolic role in that it represents his control over the underworld and acts as a reminder that the gates of the underworld were always locked so that souls could not leave. Even if the doors were open, Cerberus, the three-headed guard dog of the underworld, ensured that, while all souls were allowed to enter into the underworld freely, none could ever escape. Sometimes, artists painted Hades as looking away from the other gods, as he was disliked by them as well as humans.

As Pluto, he was regarded in a more positive light. He holds a cornucopia, representing the gifts he bestows upon people as well as fertility, which he becomes connected to.

== Realm of Hades ==
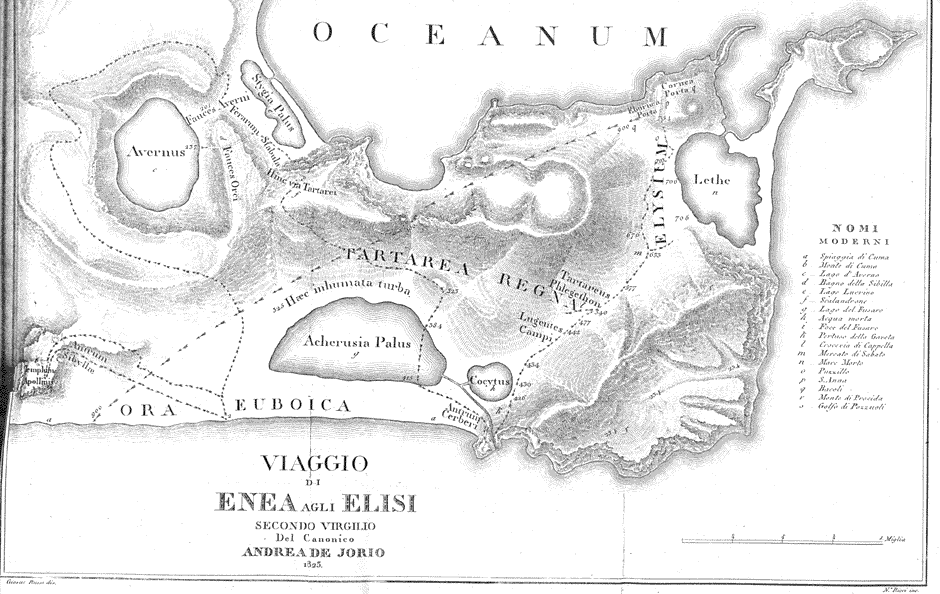
Aeneas's journey to Hades through the entrance at Cumae mapped by Andrea de Jorio, 1825

In older Greek myths, the realm of Hades is the misty and gloomy abode of the dead (also called Erebus) where all mortals go when they die. Very few mortals could leave Hades once they entered. The exceptions, Heracles and Theseus, are heroic. Even Odysseus in his Nekyia (Odyssey, xi) calls up the spirits of the departed, rather than descend to them. Later Greek philosophy introduced the idea that all mortals are judged after death and are either rewarded or cursed.

There were several sections of the realm of Hades, including Elysium, the Asphodel Meadows, and Tartarus. The mythographer Apollodorus, describes Tartarus as "a gloomy place in Hades as far distant from Earth, as Earth is distant from the sky." Greek mythographers were not perfectly consistent about the geography of the afterlife. A contrasting myth of the afterlife concerns the Garden of the Hesperides, often identified with the Isles of the Blessed, where the blessed heroes may dwell.

In Roman mythology, the entrance to the underworld located at Avernus, a crater near Cumae, was the route Aeneas used to descend to the realm of the dead. By synecdoche, "Avernus" could be substituted for the underworld as a whole. The di inferi were a collective of underworld divinities.

For Hellenes, the deceased entered the underworld by crossing the Styx, ferried across by Charon (kair'-on), who charged an obolus, a small coin for passage placed in the mouth of the deceased by pious relatives. Paupers and the friendless gathered for a hundred years on the near shore according to Book VI of Vergil's Aeneid. Greeks offered propitiatory libations to prevent the deceased from returning to the upper world to "haunt" those who had not given them a proper burial. The far side of the river was guarded by Cerberus, the three-headed dog defeated by Heracles (Roman Hercules). Passing beyond Cerberus, the shades of the departed entered the land of the dead to be judged.

The five rivers of the realm of Hades, and their symbolic meanings, are Acheron (the river of sorrow, or woe), Cocytus (lamentation), Phlegethon (fire), Lethe (oblivion), and Styx (hate), the river upon which even the gods swore and in which Achilles was dipped to render him invincible. The Styx forms the boundary between the upper and lower worlds. See also Eridanos.

The first region of Hades comprises the Fields of Asphodel, described in Odyssey xi, where the shades of heroes wander despondently among lesser spirits, who twitter around them like bats. Only libations of blood offered to them in the world of the living can reawaken in them for a time the sensations of humanity.

Beyond lay Erebus, which could be taken for a euphonym of Hades, whose own name was dread. There were two pools, that of Lethe, where the common souls flocked to erase all memory, and the pool of Mnemosyne ("memory"), where the initiates of the Mysteries drank instead. In the forecourt of the palace of Hades and Persephone sit the three judges of the underworld: Minos, Rhadamanthus, and Aeacus. There at the trivium sacred to Hecate, where three roads meet, souls are judged, returned to the Fields of Asphodel if they are neither virtuous nor evil, sent by the road to Tartarus if they are impious or evil, or sent to Elysium (Islands of the Blessed) with the "blameless" heroes.

In the Sibylline oracles, a curious hodgepodge of Greco-Roman and Judaeo-Christian elements, Hades again appears as the abode of the dead, and by way of folk etymology, it even derives Hades from the name Adam (the first man), saying it is because he was the first to enter there. Owing to its appearance in the New Testament of the Bible, Hades also has a distinct meaning in Christianity.

== Genealogy ==
Hades's family tree

Gaia
Uranus
Uranus's genitals	Coeus	Phoebe	Cronus	Rhea
Leto	Zeus	Hera	Poseidon	HADES	Demeter	Hestia
Apollo	Artemis	a
b
Ares	Hephaestus
Metis
Athena
Maia
Hermes
Semele
Dionysus
Dione
a	b
Aphrodite

== See also ==
- Angra Mainyu
- Ereshkigal
- Ghosts in Mesopotamian religions
- Hades in popular culture
- Irkalla
- Last Judgment
- Osiris
- Saveasi'uleo
- Shiva
- The Golden Bough (mythology)
- Yama (East Asia)
- Pluto
- Varuna

== Bibliography ==
=== Ancient ===
- Hesiod, Theogony, in The Homeric Hymns and Homerica with an English Translation by Hugh G. Evelyn-White, Cambridge, Massachusetts., Harvard University Press; London, William Heinemann Ltd. 1914. Online version at the Perseus Digital Library.
- Homer, The Iliad with an English Translation by A. T. Murray, Ph.D. in two volumes. Cambridge, Massachusetts., Harvard University Press; London, William Heinemann, Ltd. 1924. Online version at the Perseus Digital Library.
- Homer, The Odyssey of Homer, translated by Lattimore, Richard, Harper Perennial Modern Classics, 2006. ISBN 978-0061244186.
- Homer; The Odyssey with an English Translation by A.T. Murray, Ph.D. in two volumes. Cambridge, Massachusetts., Harvard University Press; London, William Heinemann, Ltd. 1919. Online version at the Perseus Digital Library.
- Homeric Hymn to Demeter (2), in The Homeric Hymns and Homerica with an English Translation by Hugh G. Evelyn-White, Cambridge, Massachusetts., Harvard University Press; London, William Heinemann Ltd. 1914. Online version at the Perseus Digital Library.
- Pindar, The Odes of Pindar including the Principal Fragments with an Introduction and an English Translation by Sir John Sandys, Litt.D., FBA. Cambridge, MA., Harvard University Press; London, William Heinemann Ltd. 1937. Greek text available at the Perseus Digital Library.
- Euripides, Alcestis in Euripides. Euripides, with an English translation by David Kovacs. Cambridge. Harvard University Press. 1994. Online version at the Perseus Digital Library.
- Theognis, in Elegy and Iambus. with an English Translation by. J. M. Edmonds. Cambridge, MA. Harvard University Press. London. William Heinemann Ltd. 1931. 1. Online version at the Perseus Digital Library.
- Apollodorus, Apollodorus, The Library, with an English Translation by Sir James George Frazer, F.B.A., F.R.S. in 2 Volumes. Cambridge, Massachusetts, Harvard University Press; London, William Heinemann Ltd. 1921. Online version at the Perseus Digital Library.
- Ovid, Metamorphoses, Brookes More. Boston. Cornhill Publishing Co. 1922. Online version at the Perseus Digital Library.
- Pausanias, Pausanias Description of Greece with an English Translation by W.H.S. Jones, Litt.D., and H.A. Ormerod, M.A., in 4 Volumes. Cambridge, MA, Harvard University Press; London, William Heinemann Ltd. 1918. Online version at the Perseus Digital Library.
- Strabo, Geography, translated by Horace Leonard Jones; Cambridge, Massachusetts: Harvard University Press; London: William Heinemann, Ltd. (1924). LacusCurtis, Books 6–14, at the Perseus Digital Library
- Hyginus, Astronomica from The Myths of Hyginus translated and edited by Mary Grant. University of Kansas Publications in Humanistic Studies. Online version at the Topos Text Project.
- Antoninus Liberalis, The Metamorphoses of Antoninus Liberalis translated by Francis Celoria (Routledge 1992). Online version at the Topos Text Project.
- Statius, Thebaid. Translated by Mozley, J. H. Loeb Classical Library Volumes. Cambridge, Massachusetts, Harvard University Press; London, William Heinemann Ltd. 1928.
- Oppian, Halieutica in Oppian, Colluthus, Tryphiodorus. Oppian, Colluthus, and Tryphiodorus. Translated by A. W. Mair. Loeb Classical Library 219. Cambridge, MA: Harvard University Press, 1928. Online version at topos text.
- Claudian, Rape of Persephone in Claudian: Volume II. Translated by Platnauer, Maurice. Loeb Classical Library Volume 136. Cambridge, MA. Harvard University Press. 1922.
- Lucian, Dialogues of the Dead. Dialogues of the Sea-Gods. Dialogues of the Gods. Dialogues of the Courtesans, translated by M. D. MacLeod, Loeb Classical Library No. 431, Cambridge, Massachusetts, Harvard University Press, 1961. ISBN 978-0-674-99475-1. Online version at Harvard University Press. Internet Archive.

=== Modern ===
- Anatole, Bailly (1963). Dictionnaire Grec-Français (26th ed.).
- Athanassakis, Apostolos N., and Benjamin M. Wolkow, The Orphic Hymns, Johns Hopkins University Press, 2013. ISBN 978-1-4214-0882-8. Internet Archive.
- Beekes, Robert S. P. (1998). "Hades and Elysion". In Jasanoff, Jay; Melchert, H. Craig; Oliver, Lisi (eds.). Mír curad: Studies in honor of Calvert Watkins. Institut für Sprachwissenschaft der Universität Innsbruck. pp. 17–28.
- Beekes, Robert S. P. (2009), Etymological Dictionary of Greek, Leiden: E.J. Brill.
- Bell, Malcolm, Morgantina Studies, Volume I: The Terracottas, Princeton University Press, 1982. ISBN 9781400853243.
- Clinton, Kevin, Myth and Cult: The Iconography of the Eleusinian Mysteries, Stockholm, Swedish Institute at Athens, 1992. ISBN 9179160255.
- Collard, Christopher; O'Sullivan, Patrick Dominic, eds. (2013). Euripides: Cyclops and Major Fragments of Greek Satyric Drama. Oxford: Oxbow Books.
- Dixon-Kennedy, Mike, Encyclopedia of Greco-Roman Mythology, ABC-CLIO (December 1, 1998). ISBN 978-1576070949. Internet Archive
- Gantz, Timothy, Early Greek Myth: A Guide to Literary and Artistic Sources, Johns Hopkins University Press, 1996, Two volumes: ISBN 978-0-8018-5360-9 (Vol. 1), ISBN 978-0-8018-5362-3 (Vol. 2).
- Gayley, Charles Mills, The Classic Myths in English Literature and in Art, Based Originally on Bulfinch's "Age of fable" (1855), Ginn and Company, 1911. Internet Archive.
- Guirand, Felix, Larousse Encyclopedia of Mythology, Batchworth Press Limited, 1959.
- Grant, Michael; Hazel, John (2002). Who's Who in Classical Mythology. Oxford University Press. ISBN 0415260418.
- Hansen, William, William F. Hansen, Classical Mythology: A Guide to the Mythical World of the Greeks and Romans, Oxford University Press, 2005. ISBN 9780195300352.
- Hughes, Dennis D. (2013) Human Sacrifice in Ancient Greece. London: Routledge. ISBN 9781134966394
- Ivanov, Vyacheslav V., "Old Novgorodian Nevide, Russian nevidal’ : Greek ἀίδηλος" Archived 2017-01-05 at the Wayback Machine In UCLA Indo European Studies Volume 1 edited by Vyacheslav V. Ivanov and Brent Vine, July 1999. pp. 283–293.
- Kerényi, Carl (1951), The Gods of the Greeks, Thames and Hudson, London, 1951.
- Kerényi, Carl (1967), Eleusis: Archetypal Image of Mother and Daughter, Princeton University Press. ISBN 0-691-01915-0.
- Kerényi, Carl (1976), Dionysos: Archetypal Image of Indestructible Life, Princeton University Press, ISBN 0-691-09863-8.
- Lindner, Ruth, Stefan-Christian Dahlinger, and Nikolaos Yalouris, "Hades", in Lexicon Iconographicum Mythologiae Classicae (LIMC). IV.1: Eros – Herakles, Zurich and Munich, Artemis Verlag, 1988. ISBN 3760887511. Internet Archive.
- Rayor, Diane J. (2014). The Homeric Hymns: A Translation, with Introduction and Notes, updated edition, University of California Press, ISBN 978-0-520-28211-7.
- Smith, William, Dictionary of Greek and Roman Biography and Mythology, London (1873). Online version at the Perseus Digital Library.
- Tripp, Edward, Crowell's Handbook of Classical Mythology, Thomas Y. Crowell Co; First edition (June 1970). ISBN 069022608X.
- West, M. L., European Poetry and Myth, OUP, 2007. ISBN 9780199280759.
- Wypustek, Andrzej, Images of Eternal Beauty in Funerary Verse Inscriptions of the Hellenistic and Greco-Roman Periods, Leiden and Boston, Brill, 2013. ISBN 9789004233201.
