= Macaria (daughter of Hades) =

Greek mythological figure

Macaria (Ancient Greek: Μακαρία, romanized: Makaría, lit. 'blessed one, blessedness') is a very obscure figure in ancient Greek mythology, reportedly the daughter of Hades, the god and king of the Underworld. Macaria is not mentioned in any classical Greek or Roman text, and instead her single attestation comes from a medieval Byzantine encyclopedia of the tenth century, known as the Suda. Her passing mention in the Suda offers little to no documentation at all on her character, personhood and function. She has no accompanying mythology of any sort of her own, and there is no evidence she ever received any worship in cult.

== Etymology ==
The ancient Greek noun μακαρία translates to "happiness", "bliss" or "blessed one", but alternatively it can also mean "foolishness".

== The Suda ==
This Macaria is attested in a single source, the 10th-century Byzantine encyclopedia Suda, according to which she is a daughter of Hades, the king of the Underworld; no mother is mentioned. Nothing else is known about her, as she is neither explicitly stated to be an immortal goddess nor a mortal woman, nor is she confirmed to live in the Underworld with her father. Likewise, she has no confirmed consort or children.

== Possible connections ==
In the same entry in the Suda, two more Macarias are discussed, apparently independently of the daughter of Hades: an ancient Greek proverb and Macaria, the daughter of Heracles who sacrificed herself to save her kin and city when Eurystheus attacked and besieged the children of Heracles.

According to the same author, the ancient Greek figure of speech "be gone to blessedness" meant to go "into destruction", in a euphemistic manner (as the dead were traditionally referred to as "the blessed ones"; thus dying would mean to be with the blessed). Thus, it was counterpart to the modern "go to hell". The phrase was proverbial, and used for those whose courage endangered them. According to the sophist Zenobius, this phrase was actually connected to Macaria the daughter of Heracles, and was originally said positively for those who sacrificed themselves with courage and valor.

== See also ==
- Zagreus
- Melinoë

== Bibliography ==
- E. L. von Leutsch; F. W. Schneidwein, eds. (1839). Corpus Paroemiographorum Graecorum. Vol. 1. Vandenhoeck et Ruprecht. p. 48.
- Käppel, Lutz (October 1, 2006). "Macaria". In Cancik, Hubert; Schneider, Helmuth (eds.). Brill's New Pauly. Kiel: Brill Reference On line. doi:10.1163/1574-9347_bnp_e718630. ISSN 1574-9347.
- Liddell, Henry George; Scott, Robert (1940). A Greek-English Lexicon, revised and augmented throughout by Sir Henry Stuart Jones with the assistance of Roderick McKenzie. Oxford: Clarendon Press. Online version at Perseus.tufts project.
- Smith, William (1873). A Dictionary of Greek and Roman Biography and Mythology. London, UK: John Murray, printed by Spottiswoode and Co. Online version at the Perseus.tufts library.
