= Pluto (god) =

God in Greek mythology

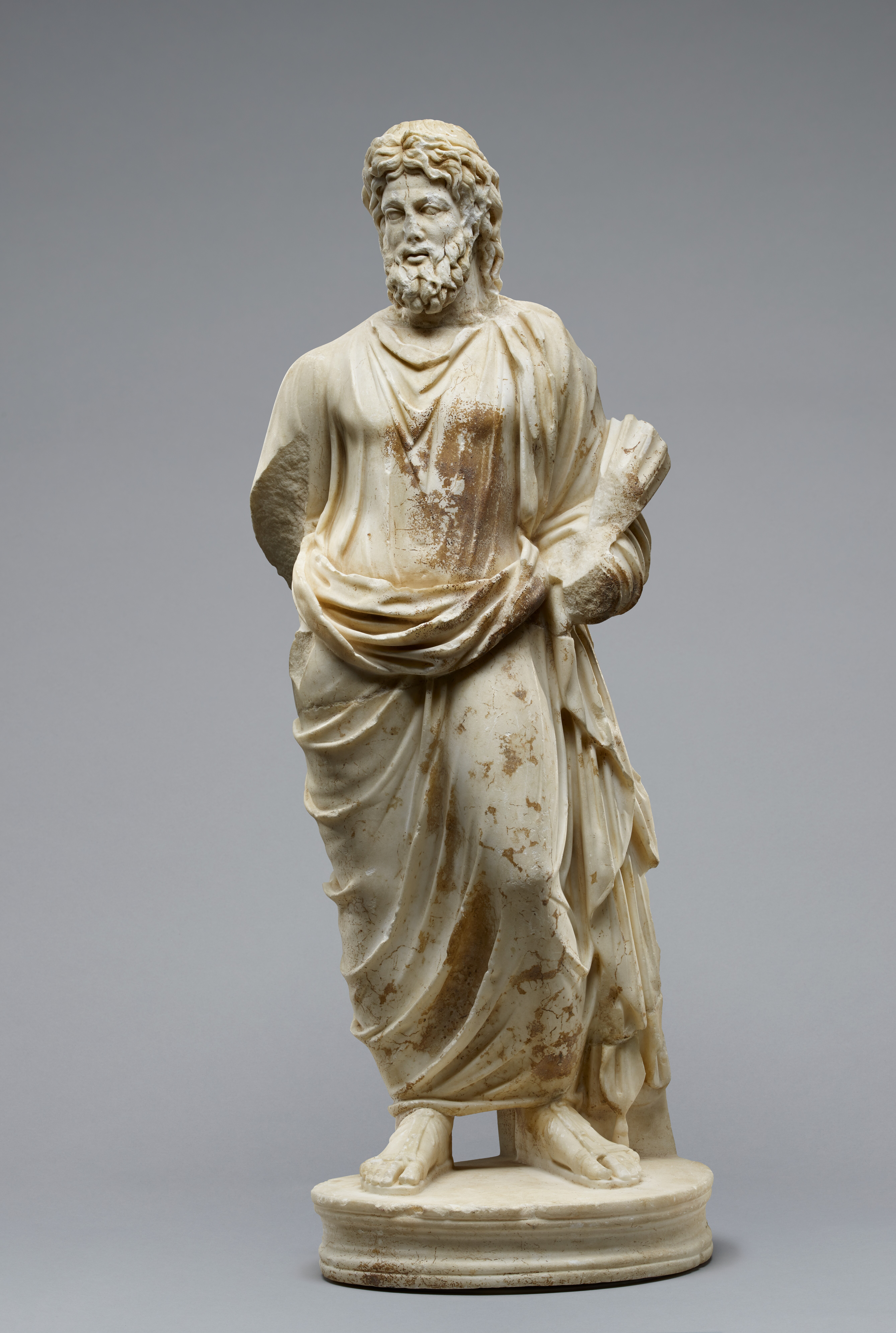
1st century sculpture of Pluto in the Getty Villa

In ancient Greek religion and mythology, Pluto (Ancient Greek: Πλούτων, romanized: Ploútōn) was the ruler of the underworld. The earlier name for the god was Hades, which became more common as the name of the underworld itself. Pluto represents a more positive concept of the god who presides over the afterlife. Ploutōn was frequently conflated with Ploûtos, the Greek god of wealth, because mineral wealth was found underground, and because as a chthonic god Pluto ruled the deep earth that contained the seeds necessary for a bountiful harvest. The name Ploutōn came into widespread usage with the Eleusinian Mysteries, in which Pluto was venerated as both a stern ruler and a husband to Persephone. The couple received souls in the afterlife and are invoked together in religious inscriptions, being referred to as Plouton and as Kore respectively. Hades, by contrast, had few temples and religious practices associated with him, and he is portrayed as the dark and violent abductor of Persephone.

Pluto and Hades differ in character, but they are not distinct figures and share two dominant myths. In Greek cosmogony, the god received the rule of the underworld in a three-way division of sovereignty over the world, with his brother Zeus ruling the sky and his other brother Poseidon sovereign over the sea. His central narrative in myth is of him abducting Persephone to be his wife and the queen of his realm. Plouton as the name of the ruler of the underworld first appears in Greek literature of the Classical period, in the works of the Athenian playwrights and of the philosopher Plato, who is the major Greek source on its significance. Under the name Pluto, the god appears in other myths in a secondary role, mostly as the possessor of a quest-object, and especially in the descent of Orpheus or other heroes to the underworld.

Plūtō ([ˈpluːtoː]; genitive Plūtōnis) is the Latinized form of the Greek Plouton. Pluto's Roman equivalent is Dis Pater, whose name is most often taken to mean "Rich Father" and is perhaps a direct translation of Plouton. Pluto was also identified with the obscure Roman Orcus, like Hades the name of both a god of the underworld and the underworld as a place. Pluto (Pluton in French and German, Plutone in Italian) becomes the most common name for the classical ruler of the underworld in subsequent Western literature and other art forms.

== Hesiod ==
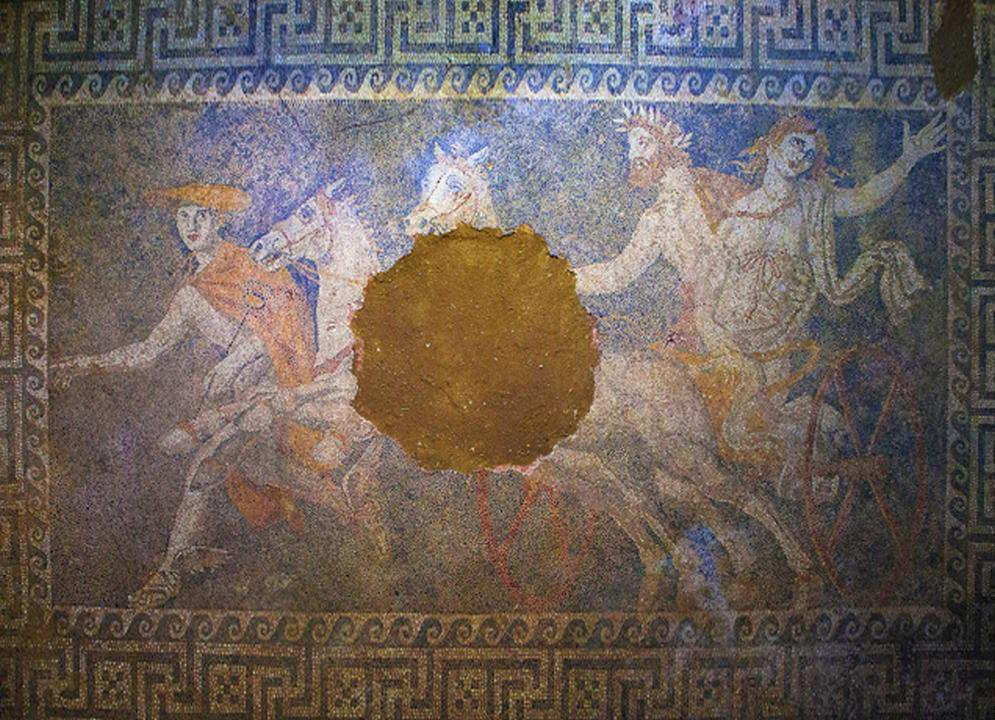
A mosaic of the Kasta Tomb in Amphipolis depicting the abduction of Persephone by Pluto which happened in the 4th century BC

The name Plouton does not appear in Greek literature of the Archaic period. In Hesiod's Theogony, the six children of Cronus and Rhea are Zeus, Hera, Poseidon, Hades, Demeter, and Hestia. The male children divide the world into three realms. Hades takes Persephone by force from her mother Demeter, with the consent of Zeus. Ploutos, "Wealth," appears in the Theogony as the child of Demeter and Iasion: "fine Plutus, who goes upon the whole earth and the broad back of the sea, and whoever meets him and comes into his hands, that man he makes rich, and he bestows much wealth upon him." The union of Demeter and Iasion, described also in the Odyssey, took place in a fallow field that had been ploughed three times, in what seems to be a reference to a ritual copulation or sympathetic magic to ensure the earth's fertility. "The resemblance of the name Ploutos to Plouton ...," it has been noted, "cannot be accidental. Plouton is lord of the dead, but as Persephone's husband he has serious claims to the powers of fertility." Demeter's son Plutus merges in the narrative tradition with her son-in-law Pluto, redefining the implacable chariot-driver Hades whose horses trample the flowering earth.

That the underworld god was associated early on with success in agricultural activity is already evident in Hesiod's Works and Days, line 465–469: "Pray to Zeus of the Earth and to pure Demeter to make Demeter's holy grain sound and heavy, when first you begin ploughing, when you hold in your hand the end of the plough-tail and bring down your stick on the backs of the oxen as they draw on the pole-bar by the yoke-straps."

== Plouton and Ploutos ==
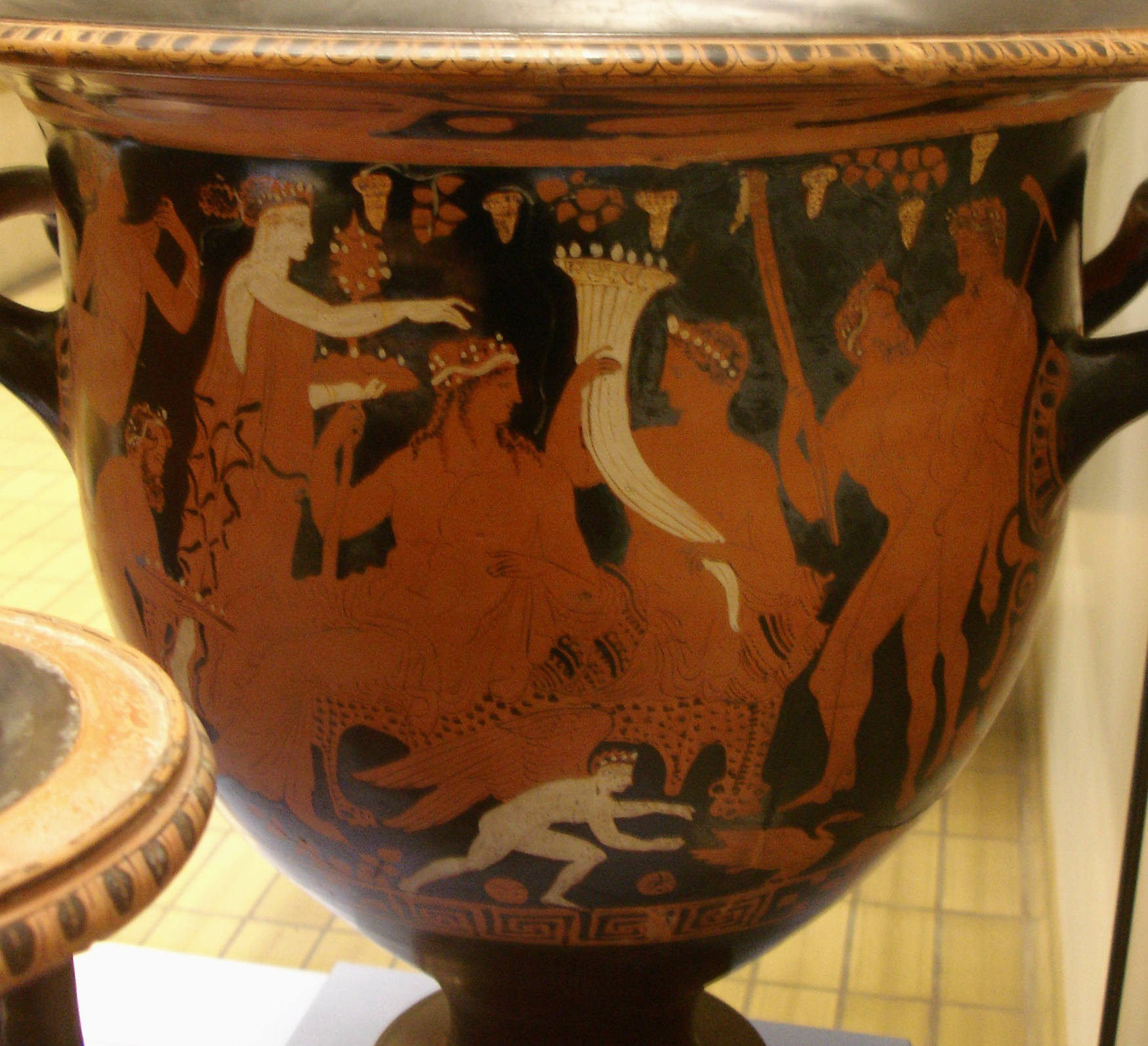
Ploutos with the horn of abundance, in the company of Dionysos (4th century BC)

Plouton was one of several euphemistic names for Hades, described in the Iliad as the god most hateful to mortals. Plato says that people prefer the name Plouton, "giver of wealth," because the name of Hades is fear-provoking. The name was understood as referring to "the boundless riches of the earth, both the crops on its surface—he was originally a god of the land—and the mines hidden within it." What is sometimes taken as "confusion" of the two gods Plouton and Ploutos ("Wealth") held or acquired a theological significance in antiquity. As a lord of abundance or riches, Pluto expresses the aspect of the underworld god that was positive, symbolized in art by the "horn of plenty" (cornucopia), by means of which Plouton is distinguished from the gloomier Hades.

The Roman poet Ennius (ca. 239–169 BC), the leading figure in the Hellenization of Latin literature, considered Pluto a Greek god to be explained in terms of the Roman equivalents Dis Pater and Orcus. It is unclear whether Pluto had a literary presence in Rome before Ennius. Some scholars think that rituals and beliefs about Pluto entered Roman culture with the establishment of the Saecular Games in 249 BC, and that Dis pater was only a translation of Plouton. In the mid-1st century BC, Cicero identifies Pluto with Dis, explaining that "The earth in all its power and plenty is sacred to Father Dis, a name which is the same as Dives, 'The Wealthy One,' as is the Greek Plouton. This is because everything is born of the earth and returns to it again."

During the Roman Imperial era, the Greek geographer Strabo (1st century AD) makes a distinction between Pluto and Hades. In his writing on the mineral wealth of ancient Iberia (Roman Spain), he says that among the Turdetani, it is "Pluto, and not Hades, who inhabits the region down below." In the discourse On Mourning by the Greek author Lucian (2nd century AD), Pluto's "wealth" is the dead he rules over in the abyss (chasma); the name Hades is reserved for the underworld itself.

=== Other identifications ===
In Greek religious practice, Pluto is sometimes seen as the "chthonic Zeus" (Zeus Chthonios or Zeus Catachthonios), or at least as having functions or significance equivalent to those of Zeus but pertaining to the earth or underworld. In ancient Roman and Hellenistic religion, Pluto was identified with a number of other deities, including Summanus, the Roman god of nocturnal thunder; Februus, the Roman god from whose purification rites the month of February takes its name and an Etruscans god of the underworld the syncretic god Serapis, regarded as Pluto's Egyptian equivalent; and the Semitic god Muth (Μούθ). Muth was described by Philo of Byblos as the equivalent of both Thanatos (Death personified) and Pluto. The ancient Greeks did not regard Pluto as "death" per se.

== Mythology ==
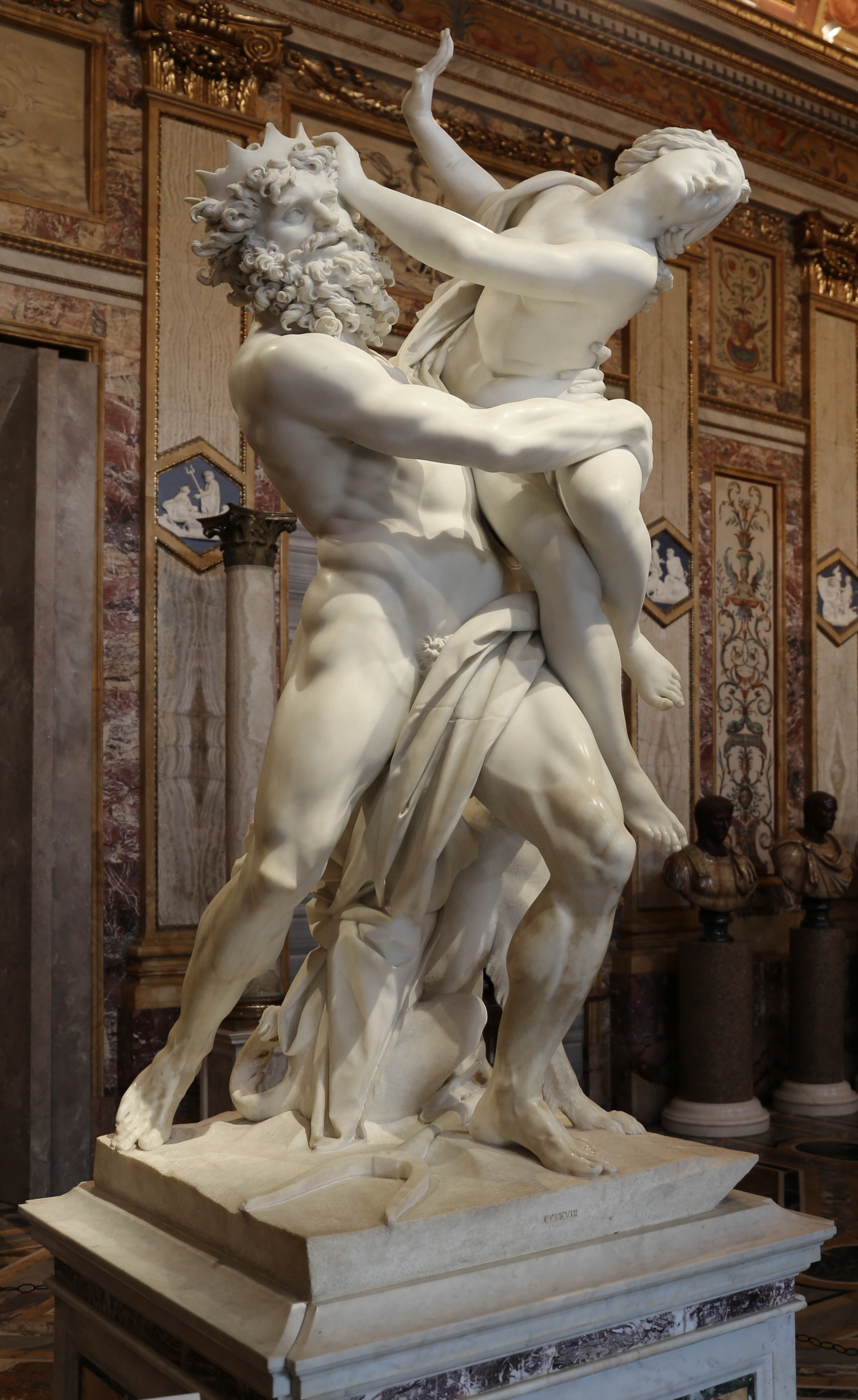
The Rape of Proserpina by Gian Lorenzo Bernini at the Galleria Borghese in Rome

The best-known myth involving Pluto or Hades is the abduction of Persephone, also known as Kore ("the Maiden"). The earliest literary versions of the myth are a brief mention in Hesiod's Theogony and the extended narrative of the Homeric Hymn to Demeter; in both these works, the ruler of the underworld is named as Hades ("the Hidden One"). Hades is an unsympathetic figure, and Persephone's unwillingness is emphasized. Increased usage of the name Plouton in religious inscriptions and literary texts reflects the influence of the Eleusinian Mysteries, which treated Pluto and Persephone as a divine couple who received initiates in the afterlife; as such, Pluto was disassociated from the "violent abductor" of Kore. Two early works that give the abductor god's name as Pluto are the Greek mythography traditionally known as the Library of "Apollodorus" (1st century BC) and the Latin Fabulae (ca. 64 BC–AD 17).

The most influential version of the abduction myth is that of Ovid (d. 17 or 18 AD), who tells the story in both the Metamorphoses (Book 5) and the Fasti (Book 4). Another major retelling, also in Latin, is the long unfinished poem De raptu Proserpinae ("On the Abduction of Proserpina") by Claudian (d. 404 AD). Ovid uses the name Dis, not Pluto in these two passages, and Claudian uses Pluto only once; translators and editors, however, sometimes supply the more familiar "Pluto" when other epithets appear in the source text. The abduction myth was a popular subject for Greek and Roman art, and recurs throughout Western art and literature, where the name "Pluto" becomes common (see Pluto in Western art and literature below). Narrative details from Ovid and Claudian influence these later versions in which the abductor is named as Pluto, especially the role of Venus and Cupid in manipulating Pluto with love and desire. Throughout the Middle Ages and Renaissance, and certainly by the time of Natale Conti's influential Mythologiae (1567), the traditions pertaining to the various rulers of the classical underworld coalesced into a single mythology that made few if any distinctions among Hades, Pluto, Dis, and Orcus.

=== Offspring ===
Unlike his freely procreating brothers Zeus and Poseidon, Pluto is monogamous, and is rarely said to have children. In Orphic texts, the chthonic nymph Melinoe is the daughter of Persephone by Zeus disguised as Pluto, and the Eumenides ("The Kindly Ones") are the offspring of Persephone and Zeus Chthonios, often identified as Pluto. The Augustan poet Vergil says that Pluto is the father of the Furies, but the mother is the goddess Nox (Nyx), not his wife Persephone. The lack of a clear distinction between Pluto and "chthonic Zeus" confuses the question of whether in some traditions, now obscure, Persephone bore children to her husband. In the late 4th century AD, Claudian's epic on the abduction motivates Pluto with a desire for children. The poem is unfinished, however, and anything Claudian may have known of these traditions is lost.

Justin Martyr (2nd century AD) alludes to children of Pluto, but neither names nor enumerates them. Hesychius (5th century AD) mentions a "son of Pluto." In his 14th-century mythography, Boccaccio records a tradition in which Pluto was the father of the divine personification Veneratio ("Reverence"), noting that she had no mother because Proserpina (the Latin name of Persephone) was sterile.

In The Faerie Queene (1590s), Edmund Spenser invents a daughter for Pluto whom he calls Lucifera. The character's name was taken from the 16th-century mythography of Natale Conti, who used it as the Latin translation of Greek phosphor, "light-bearer," a regular epithet of Hecate. Spenser incorporated aspects of the mysteries into The Faerie Queene.

=== Pluto and Orpheus ===
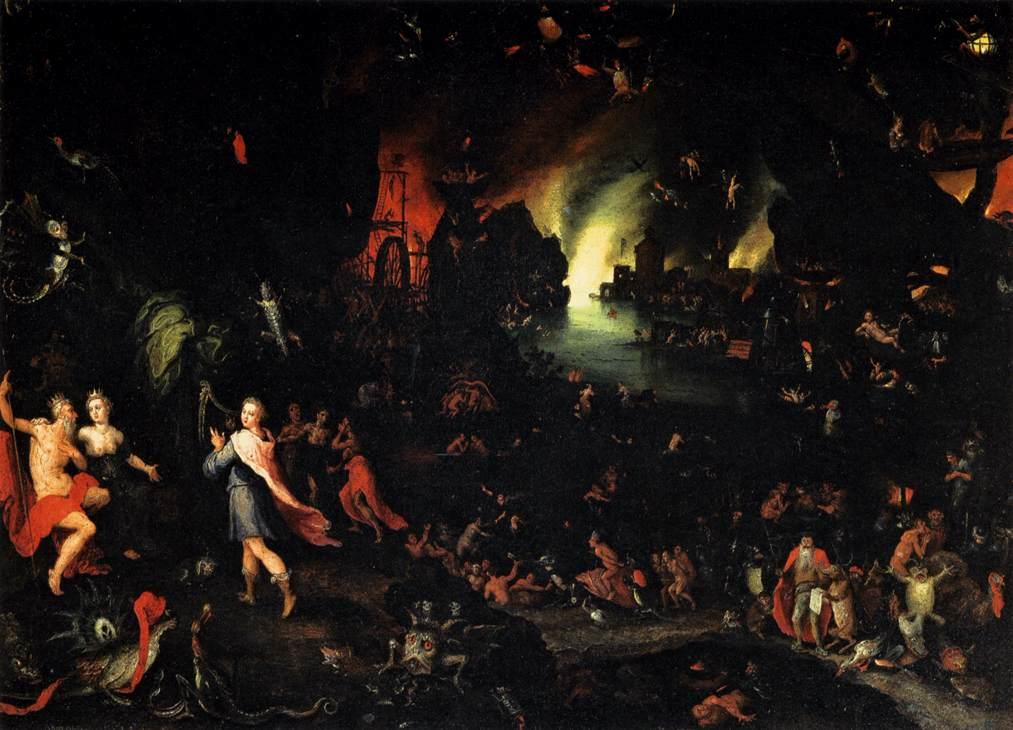
Orpheus before Pluto and Proserpina (1605), by Jan Brueghel the Elder.

Orpheus was regarded as a founder and prophet of the mysteries called "Orphic," "Dionysiac," or "Bacchic." Mythologized for his ability to entrance even animals and trees with his music, he was also credited in antiquity with the authorship of the lyrics that have survived as the Orphic Hymns, among them a hymn to Pluto. Orpheus's voice and lyre-playing represented a medium of revelation or higher knowledge for the mystery cults.

In his central myth, Orpheus visits the underworld in the hope of retrieving his bride, Eurydice, relying on the power of his music to charm the king and queen of Hades. Greek narratives of Orpheus's descent and performance typically name the ruler of the underworld as Plouton, as for instance in the Bibliotheca. The myth demonstrates the importance of Pluto "the Rich" as the possessor of a quest-object. Orpheus performing before Pluto and Persephone was a common subject of ancient and later Western literature and art, and one of the most significant mythological themes of the classical tradition.

The demonstration of Orpheus's power depends on the normal obduracy of Pluto; the Augustan poet Horace describes him as incapable of tears. Claudian, however, portrays the steely god as succumbing to Orpheus's song so that "with iron cloak he wipes his tears" (ferrugineo lacrimas deterget amictu), an image renewed by Milton in Il Penseroso (106–107): "Such notes ... / Drew iron tears down Pluto's cheek."

The Greek writer Lucian (ca. 125–after 180 AD) suggests that Pluto's love for his wife gave the ruler of the underworld a special sympathy or insight into lovers parted by death. In one of Lucian's Dialogues of the Dead, Pluto questions Protesilaus, the first Greek hero killed in the Trojan War, who wishes to return to the world of the living. "You are then in love with life?", Pluto asks. "Such lovers we have here in plenty; but they love an object, which none of them can obtain." Protesilaus explains, like an Orpheus in reverse, that he has left behind a young bride whose memory even the Lethe's waters of forgetting have not erased from him. Pluto assures him that death will reunite them someday, but Protesilaus argues that Pluto himself should understand love and its impatience, and reminds the king of his grant to Orpheus and to Alcestis, who took her husband's place in death and then was permitted at the insistence of Heracles to return to him. When Persephone intercedes for the dead warrior, Pluto grants the request at once, though allowing only one day for the reunion.

== Mysteries and cult ==
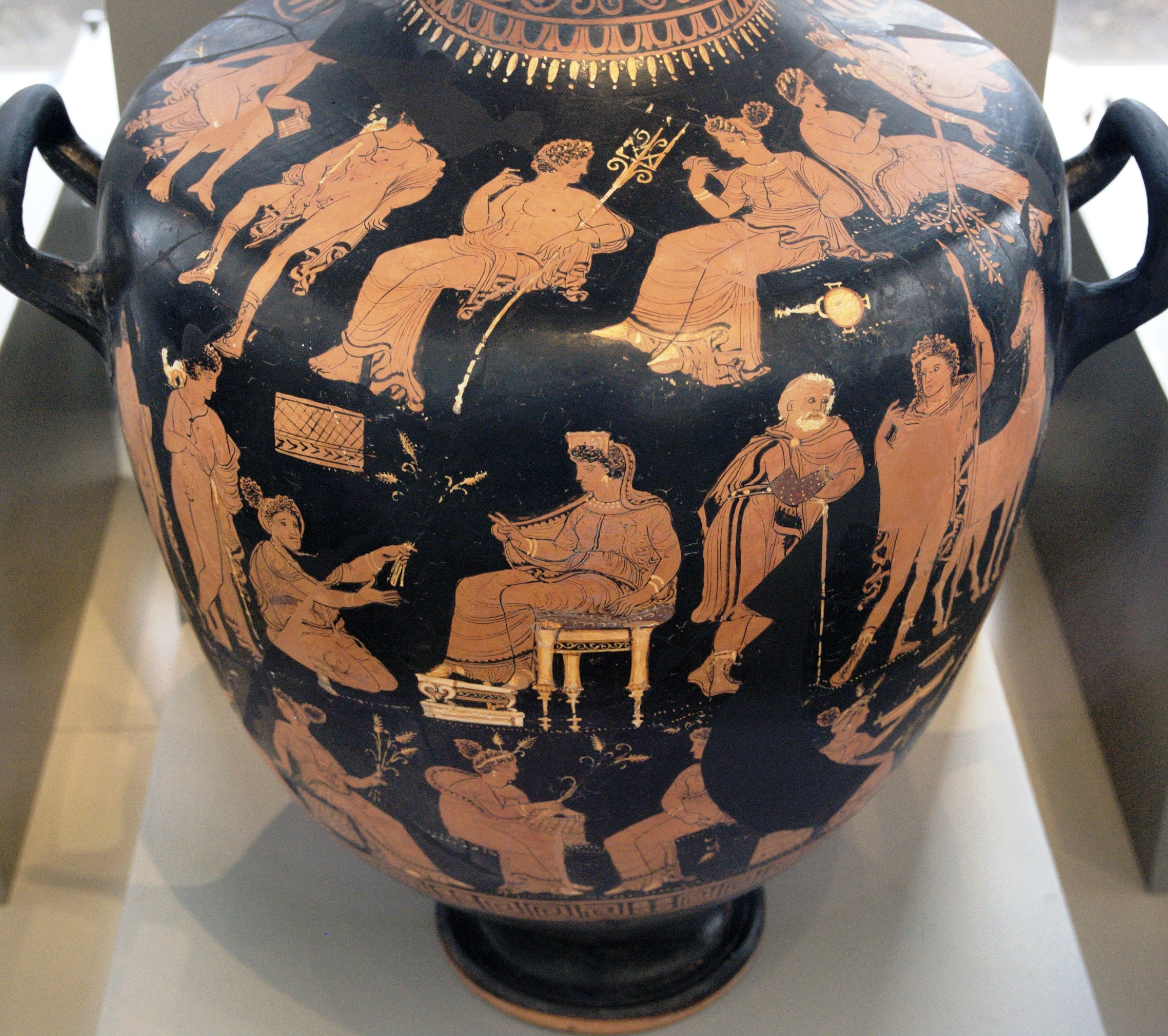
Hydria (ca. 340 BC) depicting figures from the Eleusinian Mysteries

As Pluto gained importance as an embodiment of agricultural wealth within the Eleusinian Mysteries, from the 5th century BC onward the name Hades was increasingly reserved for the underworld as a place. Neither Hades nor Pluto was one of the traditional Twelve Olympians, and Hades seems to have received limited cult, perhaps only at Elis, where the temple was opened once a year. During the time of Plato, the Athenians periodically honored the god called Plouton with the "strewing of a couch" (tên klinên strôsai). At Eleusis, Plouton had his own priestess. Pluto was worshipped with Persephone as a divine couple at Knidos, Ephesos, Mytilene, and Sparta as well as at Eleusis, where they were known simply as God (Theos) and Goddess (Thea).

In the ritual texts of the mystery religions preserved by the so-called Orphic or Bacchic gold tablets, from the late 5th century BC onward the name Hades appears more frequently than Plouton, but in reference to the underground place: Plouton is the ruler who presides over it in a harmonious partnership with Persephone. By the end of the 4th century BC, the name Plouton appears in Greek metrical inscriptions. Two fragmentary tablets greet Pluto and Persephone jointly, and the divine couple appear as welcoming figures in a metrical epitaph:

I know that even below the earth, if there is indeed a reward for the worthy ones,
the first and foremost honors, nurse, shall be yours, next to Persephone and Pluto.

Hesychius identifies Pluto with Eubouleus, but other ancient sources distinguish between these two underworld deities. In the Mysteries Eubouleus plays the role of a torchbearer, possibly a guide for the initiate's return. In the view of Lewis Richard Farnell, Eubouleus was originally a title referring to the "good counsel" the ruler of the underworld was able to give and which was sought at Pluto's dream oracles; by the 2nd century BC, however, he had acquired a separate identity.

=== Orphic Hymn to Pluto ===
The Orphic Hymn to Pluto addresses the god as "strong-spirited" and the "All-Receiver" who commands death and is the master of mortals. His titles are given as Zeus Chthonios and Euboulos ("Good Counsel"). In the hymn's topography, Pluto's dwelling is in Tartarus, simultaneously a "meadow" and "thick-shaded and dark," where the Acheron encircles "the roots of the earth." Hades is again the name of the place, here described as "windless," and its gates, through which Pluto carried "pure Demeter's daughter" as his bride, are located in an Attic cave within the district of Eleusis. The route from Persephone's meadow to Hades crosses the sea. The hymn concludes:

You alone were born to judge deeds obscure and conspicuous.
Holiest and illustrious ruler of all, frenzied god,
You delight in the worshiper's respect and reverence.
Come with favor and joy to the initiates. I summon you.

The hymn is one of several examples of Greco-Roman prayer that express a desire for the presence of a deity, and has been compared to a similar epiclesis in the Acts of Thomas.

=== Magic invocations ===
The names of both Hades and Pluto appear also in the Greek Magical Papyri and curse tablets, with Hades typically referring to the underworld as a place, and Pluto regularly invoked as the partner of Persephone. Five Latin curse tablets from Rome, dating to the mid-1st century BC, promise Persephone and Pluto an offering of "dates, figs, and a black pig" if the curse is fulfilled by the desired deadline. The pig was a characteristic animal sacrifice to chthonic deities, whose victims were almost always black or dark in color.

A set of curse tablets written in Doric Greek and found in a tomb addresses a Pasianax, "Lord to All," sometimes taken as a title of Pluto, but more recently thought to be a magical name for the corpse. Pasianax is found elsewhere as an epithet of Zeus, or in the tablets may invoke a daimon like Abrasax.

=== Sanctuaries of Pluto ===
A sanctuary dedicated to Pluto was called a ploutonion (Latin plutonium). The complex at Eleusis for the mysteries had a ploutonion regarded as the birthplace of the divine child Ploutos, in another instance of conflation or close association of the two gods. Greek inscriptions record an altar of Pluto, which was to be "plastered", that is, resurfaced for a new round of sacrifices at Eleusis. One of the known ploutonia was in the sacred grove between Tralleis and Nysa, where a temple of Pluto and Persephone was located. Visitors sought healing and dream oracles. The ploutonion at Hierapolis, Phrygia, was connected to the rites of Cybele, but during the Roman Imperial era was subsumed by the cult of Apollo, as confirmed by archaeological investigations during the 1960s. It too was a dream oracle. The sites often seem to have been chosen because the presence of naturally occurring mephitic vapors was thought to indicate an opening to the underworld. In Italy, Avernus was considered an entrance to the underworld that produced toxic vapors, but Strabo seems not to think that it was a ploutonion.

== Iconography and attributes ==
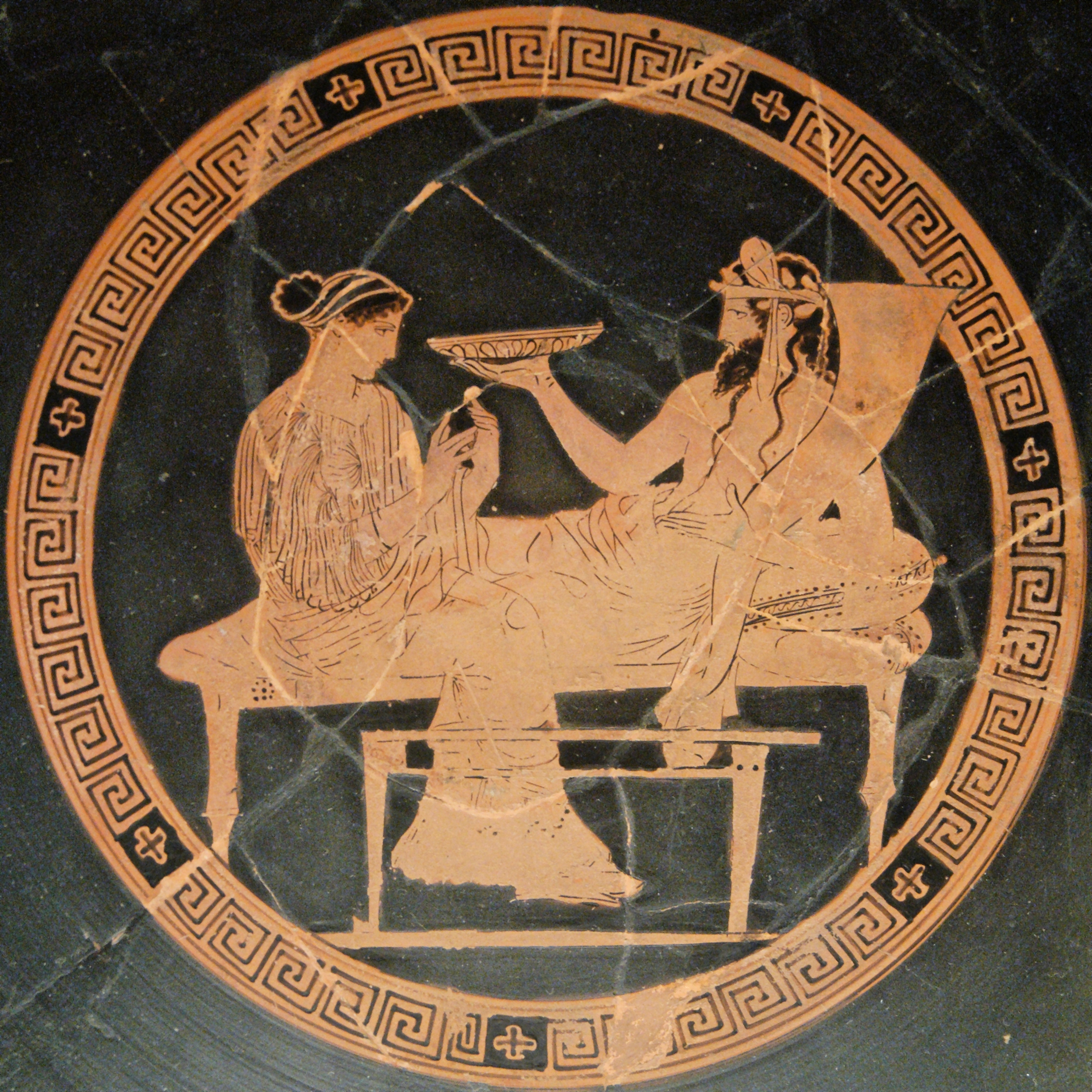
Hades and Persephone: tondo of an Attic red-figured kylix, ca. 440–430 BC

=== In Eleusinian scenes ===
Kevin Clinton attempted to distinguish the iconography of Hades, Plouton, Ploutos, and the Eleusinian Theos in 5th-century vase painting that depicts scenes from or relating to the mysteries. In Clinton's schema, Plouton is a mature man, sometimes even white-haired; Hades is also usually bearded and mature, but his darkness is emphasized in literary descriptions, represented in art by dark hair. Plouton's most common attribute is a sceptre, but he also often holds a full or overflowing cornucopia; Hades sometimes holds a horn, but it is depicted with no contents and should be understood as a drinking horn. Unlike Plouton, Hades never holds agrarian attributes such as stalks of grain. His chest is usually bare or only partly covered, whereas Plouton is fully robed (exceptions, however, are admitted by the author). Plouton stands, often in the company of both Demeter and Kore, or sometimes one of the goddesses, but Hades almost always sits or reclines, usually with Persephone facing him. "Confusion and disagreement" about the interpretation of these images remain.

=== The keys of Pluto ===
Attributes of Pluto mentioned in the Orphic Hymn to Pluto are his scepter, keys, throne, and horses. In the hymn, the keys are connected to his capacity for giving wealth to humanity, specifically the agricultural wealth of "the year's fruits."

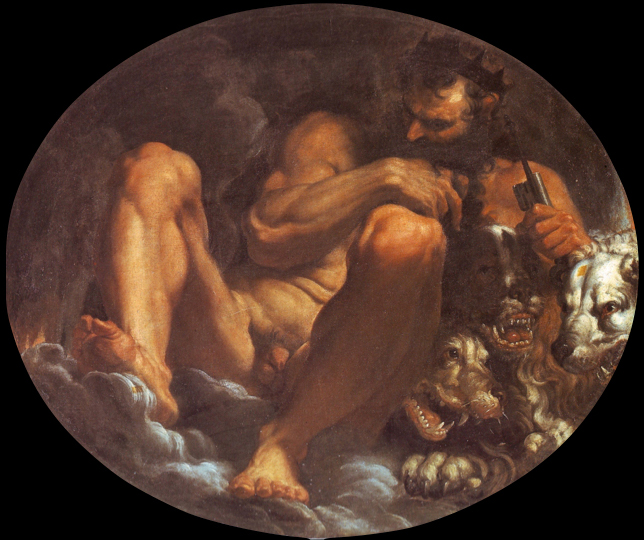
Pluto (1592) by Agostino Carracci, probably influenced by the description in Vincenzo Cartari's mythography, with the god holding his scepter and key, Cerberus at his side

Pausanias explains the significance of Pluto's key in describing a wondrously carved cedar chest at the Temple of Hera in Elis. Numerous deities are depicted, with one panel grouping Dionysus, Persephone, the nymphs and Pluto. Pluto holds a key because "they say that what is called Hades has been locked up by Pluto, and that nobody will return back again therefrom." Natale Conti cites Pausanias in noting that keys are an attribute of Pluto as the scepter is of Jove (Greek Zeus) and the trident of Neptune (Poseidon).

A golden key (chrusea klês) was laid on the tongue of initiates by priests at Eleusis and was a symbol of the revelation they were obligated to keep secret. A key is among the attributes of other infernal deities such as Hecate, Anubis, and Persephone, and those who act as guardians or timekeepers, such as Janus and Aion. Aeacus (Aiakos), one of the three mortal kings who became judges in the afterlife, is also a kleidouchos (κλειδοῦχος), "holder of the keys," and a priestly doorkeeper in the court of Pluto and Persephone.

=== Vegetation and color ===
According to the Stoic philosopher Cornutus (1st century AD), Pluto wore a wreath of phasganion, more often called xiphion, traditionally identified as a type of gladiolus. Dioscorides recorded medical uses for the plant. For extracting stings and thorns, xiphion was mixed with wine and frankincense to make a cataplasm. The plant was also used as an aphrodisiac and contraceptive. It grew in humid places. In an obscure passage, Cornutus seems to connect Pluto's wearing of phasganion to an etymology for Avernus, which he derives from the word for "air," perhaps through some association with the color glaukos, "bluish grey," "greenish" or "sea-colored," which might describe the plant's leaves. Because the color could describe the sky, Cornutus regularly gives it divine connotations. Pluto's twin sister was named Glauca.

Ambiguity of color is characteristic of Pluto. Although both he and his realm are regularly described as dark, black, or gloomy, the god himself is sometimes seen as pale or having a pallor. Martianus Capella (5th century) describes him as both "growing pale in shadow, a fugitive from light" and actively "shedding darkness in the gloom of Tartarean night," crowned with a wreath made of ebony as suitable for the kingdom he governs. The horses of Pluto are usually black, but Ovid describes them as "sky-colored" (caeruleus, from caelum, "sky"), which might be blue, greenish-blue, or dark blue.

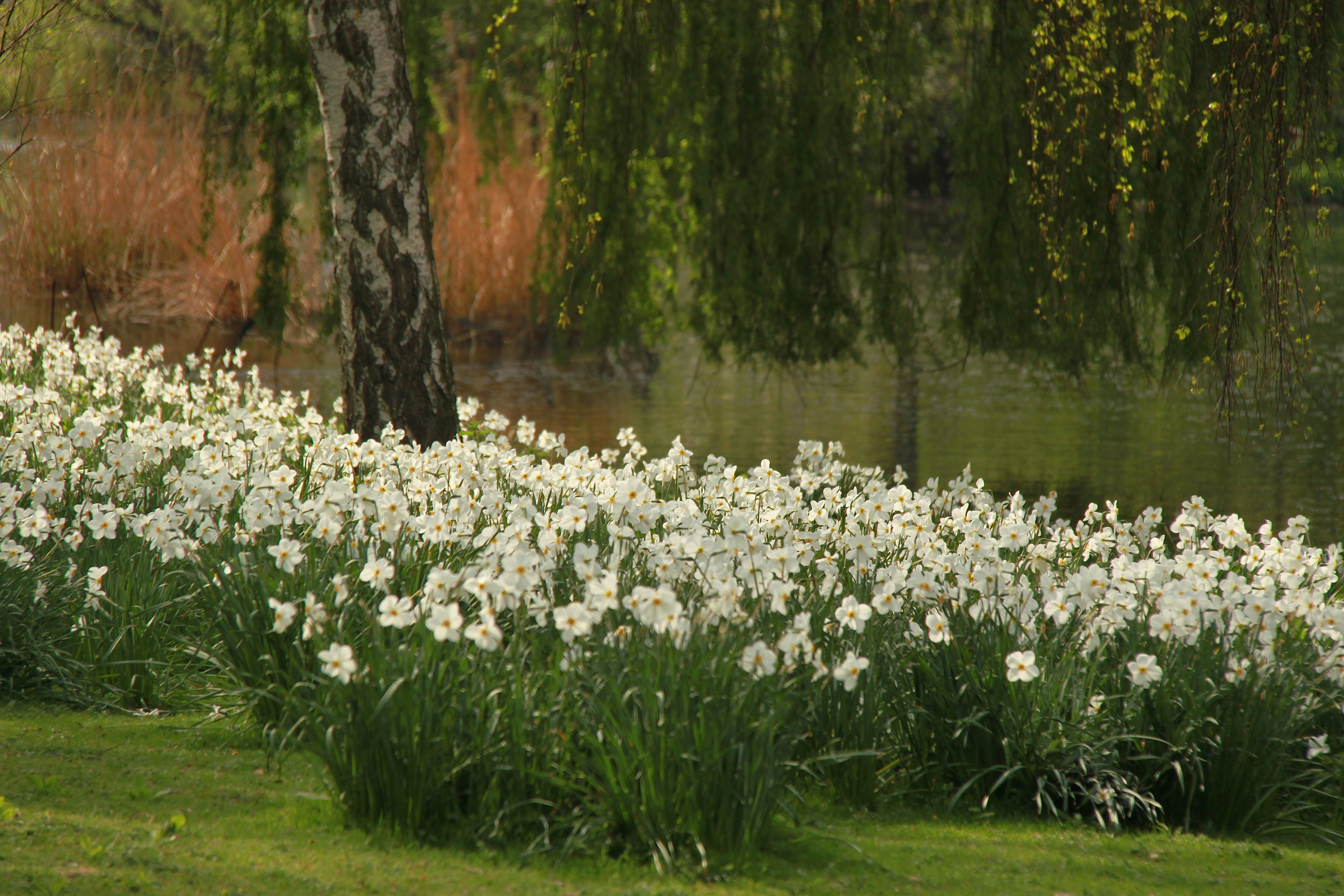
The narcissus, frequently linked to the myth of Persephone, who was snatched into the Underworld by the god Hades while picking the flowers

The Renaissance mythographer Natale Conti says wreaths of narcissus, maidenhair fern (adianthus), and cypress were given to Pluto. In the Homeric Hymn to Demeter, Gaia (Earth) produced the narcissus at Zeus's request as a snare for Persephone; when she grasps it, a chasm opens up and the "Host to Many" (Hades) seizes her. Narcissus wreaths were used in early times to crown Demeter and Persephone, as well as the Furies (Eumenides). The flower was associated with narcotic drugginess (narkê, "torpor"), erotic fascination, and imminent death; to dream of crowning oneself with narcissus was a bad sign. In the myth of Narcissus, the flower is created when a beautiful, self-absorbed youth rejects sexuality and is condemned to perpetual self-love along the Styx.

Conti's inclusion of adianthus (Adiantum in modern nomenclature) is less straightforward. The name, meaning "unmoistened" (Greek adianton), was taken in antiquity to refer to the fern's ability to repel water. The plant, which grew in wet places, was also called capillus veneris, "hair of Venus," divinely dry when she emerged from the sea. Historian of medicine John M. Riddle has suggested that the adianthus was one of the ferns Dioscorides called asplenon and prescribed as a contraceptive (atokios). The associations of Proserpine (Persephone) and the maidenhair are alluded to by Samuel Beckett in a 1946 poem, in which the self is a Platonic cave with capillaires, in French both "maidenhair fern" and "blood vessels".

The cypress (Greek cyparissus, Latin cupressus) has traditional associations with mourning. In ancient Attica, households in mourning were garlanded with cypress, and it was used to fumigate the air during cremations. In the myth of Cyparissus, a youth was transformed into a cypress, consumed by grief over the accidental death of a pet stag. A "white cypress" is part of the topography of the underworld that recurs in the Orphic gold tablets as a kind of beacon near the entrance, perhaps to be compared with the Tree of Life in various world mythologies. The description of the cypress as "white" (Greek leukē), since the botanical tree is dark, is symbolic, evoking the white garments worn by initiates or the clothing of a corpse, or the pallor of the dead. In Orphic funeral rites, it was forbidden to make coffins of cypress.

The tradition of the mystery religions favors Pluton/Hades as a loving and faithful partner to Persephone, but one ancient myth that preserves a lover for him parallels the abduction and also has a vegetative aspect. A Roman source says that Pluto fell in love with Leuca (Greek Leukē, "White"), the most beautiful of the nymphs, and abducted her to live with him in his realm. After the long span of her life came to its end, he memorialized their love by creating a white tree in the Elysian Fields. The tree was the white poplar (Greek leukē), the leaves of which are white on one side and dark on the other, representing the duality of upper and underworld. A wreath of white poplar leaves was fashioned by Heracles to mark his ascent from the underworld, an aition for why it was worn by initiates and by champion athletes participating in funeral games. Like other plants associated with Pluto, white poplar was regarded as a contraceptive in antiquity. The relation of this tree to the white cypress of the mysteries is debated.

=== The helmet of invisibility ===
The Bibliotheca of Pseudo-Apollodorus uses the name Plouton instead of Hades in relating the tripartite division of sovereignty, the abduction of Persephone, and the visit of Orpheus to the underworld. This version of the theogony for the most part follows Hesiod (see above), but adds that the three brothers were each given a gift by the Cyclopes to use in their battle against the Titans: Zeus thunder and lightning; Poseidon a trident; and Pluto a helmet (kyneê).

The helmet Pluto receives is presumably the magical Cap of Invisibility (aidos kyneê), but the Bibliotheca is the only ancient source that explicitly says it belonged to Pluto. The verbal play of aidos, "invisible," and Hades is thought to account for this attribution of the helmet to the ruler of the underworld, since no ancient narratives record his use or possession of it. Later authors such as Rabelais (16th century) do attribute the helmet to Pluto. Erasmus calls it the "helmet of Orcus" and gives it as a figure of speech referring to those who conceal their true nature by a cunning device. Francis Bacon notes the proverbial usage: "the helmet of Pluto, which maketh the politic man go invisible, is secrecy in the counsel, and celerity in the execution."

=== Bident ===
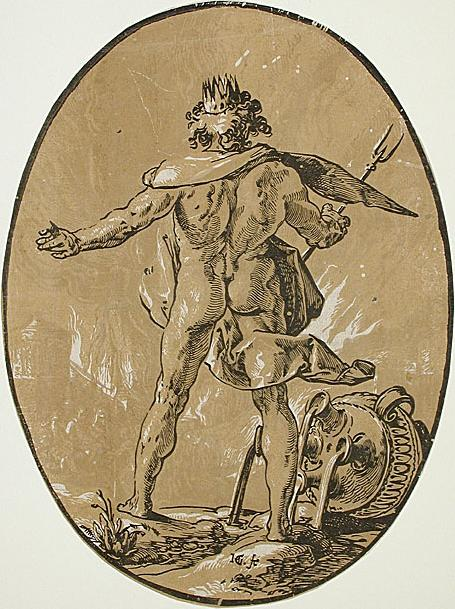
Pluto (1588–89) with bident, chiaroscuro woodcut from a series on gods and goddesses by Hendrik Goltzius

No ancient image of the ruler of the underworld can be said with certainty to show him with a bident, though the ornamented tip of his scepter may have been misunderstood at times as a bident. In the Roman world, the bident (from bi-, "two" + dent-, "teeth") was an agricultural implement. It may also represent one of the three types of lightning wielded by Jupiter, the Roman counterpart of Zeus, and the Etruscan Tinia. The later notion that the ruler of the underworld wielded a trident or bident can perhaps be traced to a line in Seneca's Hercules Furens ("Hercules Enraged"), in which Father Dis, the Roman counterpart of Pluto, uses a three-pronged spear to drive off Hercules as he attempts to invade Pylos. Seneca calls Dis the "Infernal Jove" or the "dire Jove" (the Jove who gives dire or ill omens, dirae), just as in the Greek tradition, Plouton is sometimes identified as a "chthonic Zeus." That the trident and bident might be somewhat interchangeable is suggested by a Byzantine scholiast, who mentions Poseidon being armed with a bident.

In the Middle Ages, classical underworld figures began to be depicted with a pitchfork. Early Christian writers had identified the classical underworld with Hell, and its denizens as demons or devils. In the Renaissance, the bident became a conventional attribute of Pluto. In an influential ceiling mural depicting the wedding of Cupid and Psyche, painted by Raphael's workshop for the Villa Farnesina in 1517, Pluto is shown holding the bident, with Cerberus at his side, while Neptune holds the trident. Perhaps influenced by this work, Agostino Carracci originally depicted Pluto with a bident in a preparatory drawing for his painting Pluto (1592), in which the god ended up holding his characteristic key. In Caravaggio's Giove, Nettuno e Plutone (ca. 1597), a ceiling mural based on alchemical allegory, it is Neptune who holds the bident.

== In Greek literature and philosophy ==
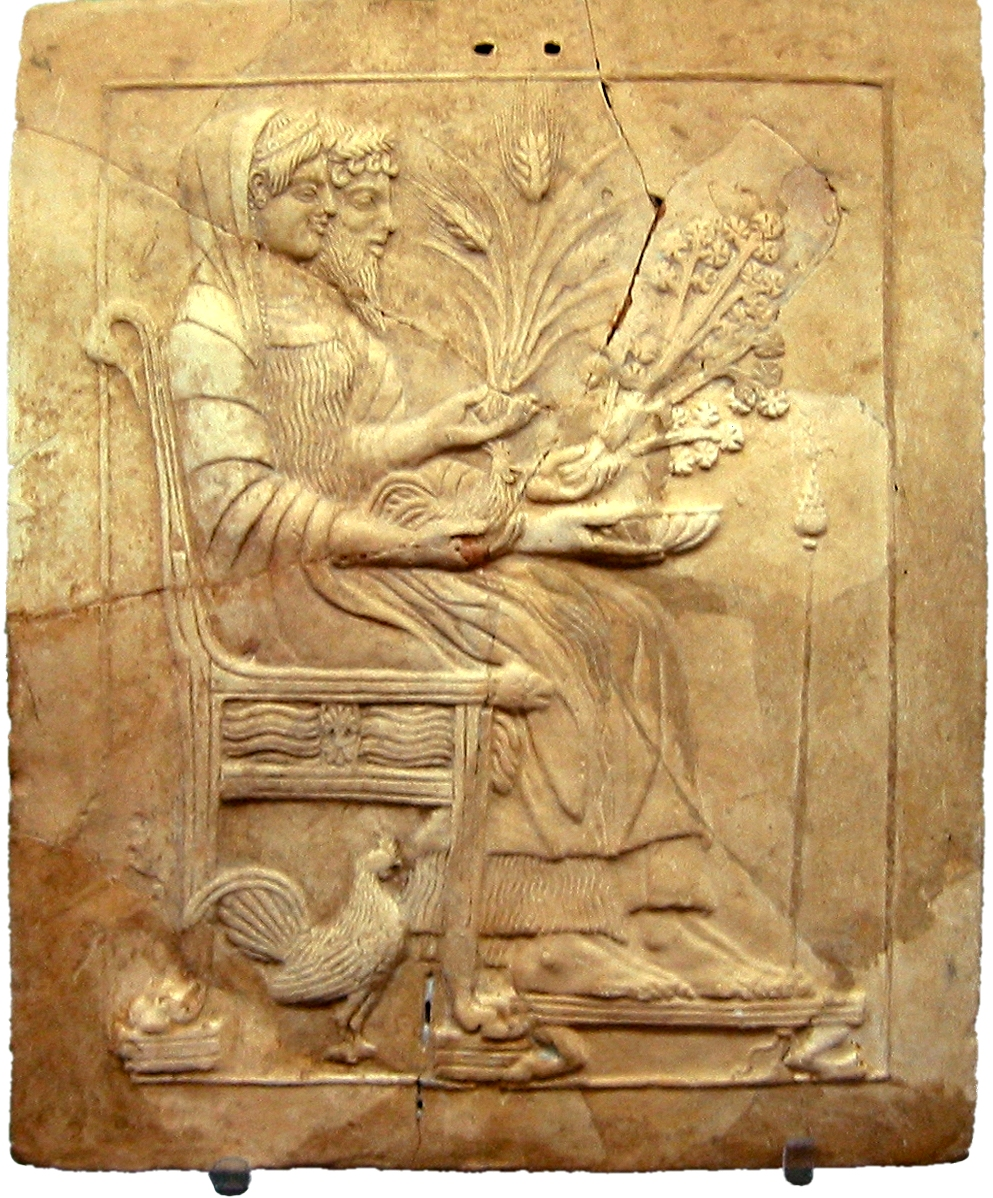
Persephone and Pluto or Hades on a pinax from Locri

The name Plouton is first used in Greek literature by Athenian playwrights. In Aristophanes' comedy The Frogs (Batrachoi, 405 BC), in which "the Eleusinian colouring is in fact so pervasive," the ruler of the underworld is one of the characters, under the name of Plouton. The play depicts a mock descent to the underworld by the god Dionysus to bring back one of the dead tragic playwrights in the hope of restoring Athenian theater to its former glory. Pluto is a silent presence onstage for about 600 lines presiding over a contest among the tragedians, then announces that the winner has the privilege of returning to the upper world. The play also draws on beliefs and imagery from Orphic and Dionysiac cult, and rituals pertaining to Ploutos (Plutus, "wealth"). In a fragment from another play by Aristophanes, a character "is comically singing of the excellent aspects of being dead", asking in reference to the tripartition of sovereignty over the world:

And where do you think Pluto gets his name [i.e. "rich"],
if not because he took the best portion?
...
How much better are things below than what Zeus possesses!

To Plato, the god of the underworld was "an agent in [the] beneficent cycle of death and rebirth" meriting worship under the name of Plouton, a giver of spiritual wealth. In the dialogue Cratylus, Plato has Socrates explain the etymology of Plouton, saying that Pluto gives wealth (ploutos), and his name means "giver of wealth, which comes out of the earth beneath". Because the name Hades is taken to mean "the invisible", people fear what they cannot see; although they are in error about the nature of this deity's power, Socrates says, "the office and name of the God really correspond":

He is the perfect and accomplished Sophist, and the great benefactor of the inhabitants of the other world; and even to us who are upon earth he sends from below exceeding blessings. For he has much more than he wants down there; wherefore he is called Pluto (or the rich). Note also, that he will have nothing to do with men while they are in the body, but only when the soul is liberated from the desires and evils of the body. Now there is a great deal of philosophy and reflection in that; for in their liberated state he can bind them with the desire of virtue, but while they are flustered and maddened by the body, not even father Cronos himself would suffice to keep them with him in his own far-famed chains.

Since "the union of body and soul is not better than the loosing," death is not an evil. Walter Burkert thus sees Pluto as a "god of dissolution." Among the titles of Pluto was Isodaitēs, "divider into equal portions," a title that connects him to the fate goddesses the Moirai. Isodaitēs was also a cult title for Dionysus and Helios.

In ordering his ideal city, Plato proposed a calendar in which Pluto was honored as a benefactor in the twelfth month, implicitly ranking him as one of the twelve principal deities. In the Attic calendar, the twelfth month, more or less equivalent to June, was Skirophorion; the name may be connected to the rape of Persephone.

== Theogonies and cosmology ==
=== Euhemerism and Latinization ===
In the theogony of Euhemerus (4th century BC), the gods were treated as mortal rulers whose deeds were immortalized by tradition. Ennius translated Euhemerus into Latin about a hundred years later, and a passage from his version was in turn preserved by the early Christian writer Lactantius. Here the union of Saturn (the Roman equivalent of Cronus) and Ops, an Italic goddess of abundance, produces Jupiter (Greek Zeus), Juno (Hera), Neptune, Pluto, and Glauca:

Then Saturn took Ops to wife. Titan, the elder brother, demanded the kingship for himself. Vesta their mother, with their sisters Ceres [Demeter] and Ops, persuaded Saturn not to give way to his brother in the matter. Titan was less good-looking than Saturn; for that reason, and also because he could see his mother and sisters working to have it so, he conceded the kingship to Saturn, and came to terms with him: if Saturn had a male child born to him, it would not be reared. This was done to secure reversion of the kingship to Titan's children. They then killed the first son that was born to Saturn. Next came twin children, Jupiter and Juno. Juno was given to Saturn to see while Jupiter was secretly removed and given to Vesta to be brought up without Saturn's knowledge. In the same way without Saturn knowing, Ops bore Neptune and hid him away. In her third labor Ops bore another set of twins, Pluto and Glauce. (Pluto in Latin is Dis pater; some call him Orcus.) Saturn was shown his daughter Glauce but his son Pluto was hidden and removed. Glauce then died young. That is the pedigree, as written, of Jupiter and his brothers; that is how it has been passed down to us in holy scripture.

In this theogony, which Ennius introduced into Latin literature, Saturn, "Titan," Vesta, Ceres, and Ops are siblings; Glauca is the twin of Pluto and dies mysteriously young. There are several mythological figures named Glauca; the sister of Pluto may be the Glauca who in Cicero's account of the three aspects of Diana conceived the third with the equally mysterious Upis. This is the genealogy for Pluto that Boccaccio used in his Genealogia Deorum Gentilium and in his lectures explicating the Divine Comedy of Dante.

In Book 3 of the Sibylline Oracles, dating mostly to the 2nd century AD, Rhea gives birth to Pluto as she passes by Dodona, "where the watery paths of the River Europus flowed, and the water ran into the sea, merged with the Peneius. This is also called the Stygian river."

=== Orphic and philosophical systems ===
The Orphic theogonies are notoriously varied, and Orphic cosmology influenced the varying Gnostic theogonies of late antiquity. Clementine literature (4th century AD) preserves a theogony with explicit Orphic influence that also draws on Hesiod, yielding a distinctive role for Pluto. When the primordial elements came together by orderly cyclonic force, they produced a generative sphere, the "egg" from which the primeval Orphic entity Phanes is born and the world is formed. The release of Phanes and his ascent to the heavenly top of the world-egg causes the matter left in the sphere to settle in relation to weight, creating the tripartite world of the traditional theogonies:

Its lower part, the heaviest element, sinks downwards, and is called Pluto because of its gravity, weight, and great quantity (plêthos) of matter. After the separation of this heavy element in the middle part of the egg the waters flow together, which they call Poseidon. The purest and noblest element, the fire, is called Zeus, because its nature is glowing (ζέουσα, zeousa). It flies right up into the air, and draws up the spirit, now called Metis, that was left in the underlying moisture. And when this spirit has reached the summit of the ether, it is devoured by Zeus, who in his turn begets the intelligence (σύνεσις, sunesis), also called Pallas. And by this artistic intelligence the etherial artificer creates the whole world. This world is surrounded by the air, which extends from Zeus, the very hot ether, to the earth; this air is called Hera.

This cosmogony interprets Hesiod allegorically, and so the heaviest element is identified not as the Earth, but as the netherworld of Pluto. (In modern geochemistry, plutonium is the heaviest primordial element.) Supposed etymologies are used to make sense of the relation of physical process to divine name; Plouton is here connected to plêthos (abundance).

In the Stoic system, Pluto represented the lower region of the air, where according to Seneca (1st century AD) the soul underwent a kind of purgatory before ascending to the ether. Seneca's contemporary Cornutus made use of the traditional etymology of Pluto's name for Stoic theology. The Stoics believed that the form of a word contained the original truth of its meaning, which over time could become corrupted or obscured. Plouton derived from ploutein, "to be wealthy," Cornutus said, because "all things are corruptible and therefore are 'ultimately consigned to him as his property.'"

Within the Pythagorean and Neoplatonic traditions, Pluto was allegorized as the region where souls are purified, located between the Moon (as represented by Persephone) and the Sun. Neoplatonists sometimes interpreted the Eleusinian Mysteries as a fabula of celestial phenomena:

Authors tell the fable that Ceres was Proserpina's mother, and that Proserpina while playing one day was kidnapped by Pluto. Her mother searched for her with lighted torches; and it was decreed by Jupiter that the mother should have her daughter for fifteen days in the month, but Pluto for the rest, the other fifteen. This is nothing but that the name Ceres is used to mean the earth, called Ceres on analogy with crees ('you may create'), for all things are created from her. By Proserpina is meant the moon, and her name is on analogy with prope serpens ('creeping near'), for she is moved nearer to the earth than the other planets. She is called earth's daughter, because her substance has more of earth in it than of the other elements. By Pluto is meant the shadow that sometimes obstructs the moon.

==== Plouton Helios ====
Jupiter, Neptune, and Pluto, ceiling mural (ca. 1597) by Caravaggio (see description under Fine art below)

A dedicatory inscription from Smyrna describes a 1st–2nd century sanctuary to "God Himself" as the most exalted of a group of six deities, including clothed statues of Plouton Helios and Koure Selene, "Pluto the Sun" and "Kore the Moon." The status of Pluto and Kore as a divine couple is marked by what the text describes as a "linen embroidered bridal curtain." The two are placed as bride and groom within an enclosed temple, separately from the other deities cultivated at the sanctuary.

Plouton Helios is mentioned in other literary sources in connection with Koure Selene and Helios Apollon; the sun on its nighttime course was sometimes envisioned as traveling through the underworld on its return to the east. Apuleius describes a rite in which the sun appears at midnight to the initiate at the gates of Proserpina; it has been suggested that this midnight sun could be Plouton Helios.

The Smyrna inscription also records the presence of Helios Apollon at the sanctuary. As two forms of Helios, Apollo and Pluto pose a dichotomy:

Helios Apollon	Plouton Helios
One	Many
clarity	invisibility
bright	dark
memory	oblivion

It has been argued that the sanctuary was in the keeping of a Pythagorean sodality or "brotherhood". The relation of Orphic beliefs to the mystic strand of Pythagoreanism, or of these to Platonism and Neoplatonism, is complex and much debated.

==== Plutonius ====
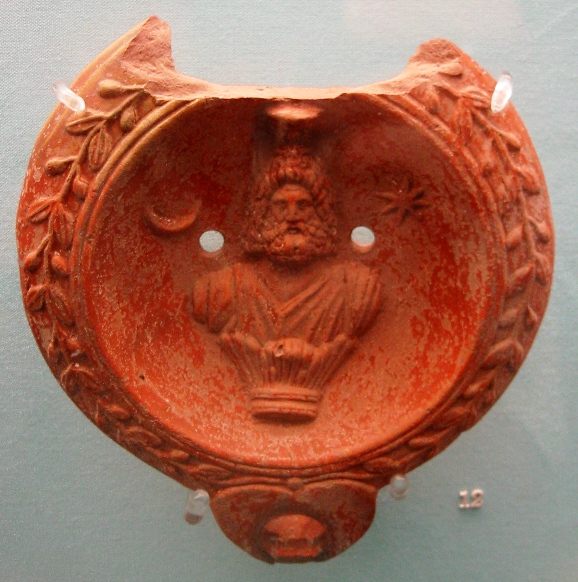
Serapis with moon and sun on oil lamp

In the Hellenistic era, the title or epithet Plutonius is sometimes affixed to the names of other deities. In the Hermetic Corpus, Jupiter Plutonius "rules over earth and sea, and it is he who nourishes mortal things that have soul and bear fruit."

In Ptolemaic Alexandria, at the site of a dream oracle, Serapis was identified with Aion Plutonius. Gilles Quispel conjectured that this figure results from the integration of the Orphic Phanes into Mithraic religion at Alexandria, and that he "assures the eternity of the city," where the birth of Aion was celebrated at the sanctuary of Kore on 6 January. In Latin, Plutonius can be an adjective that simply means "of or pertaining to Pluto."

==== Neoplatonic demiurge ====
The Neoplatonist Proclus (5th century AD) considered Pluto the third demiurge, a sublunar demiurge who was also identified variously with Poseidon or Hephaestus. This idea is present in Renaissance Neoplatonism, as for instance in the cosmology of Marsilio Ficino (1433–99), who translated Orphic texts into Latin for his own use. Ficino saw the sublunar demiurge as "a daemonic 'many-headed' sophist, a magus, an enchanter, a fashioner of images and reflections, a shape-changer of himself and of others, a poet in a way of being and of not-being, a royal Pluto." This demiurgic figure identified with Pluto is also "'a purifier of souls' who presides over the magic of love and generation and who uses a fantastic counter-art to mock, but also ... to supplement, the divine icastic or truly imitative art of the sublime translunar Demiurge."

== In Western art and literature ==
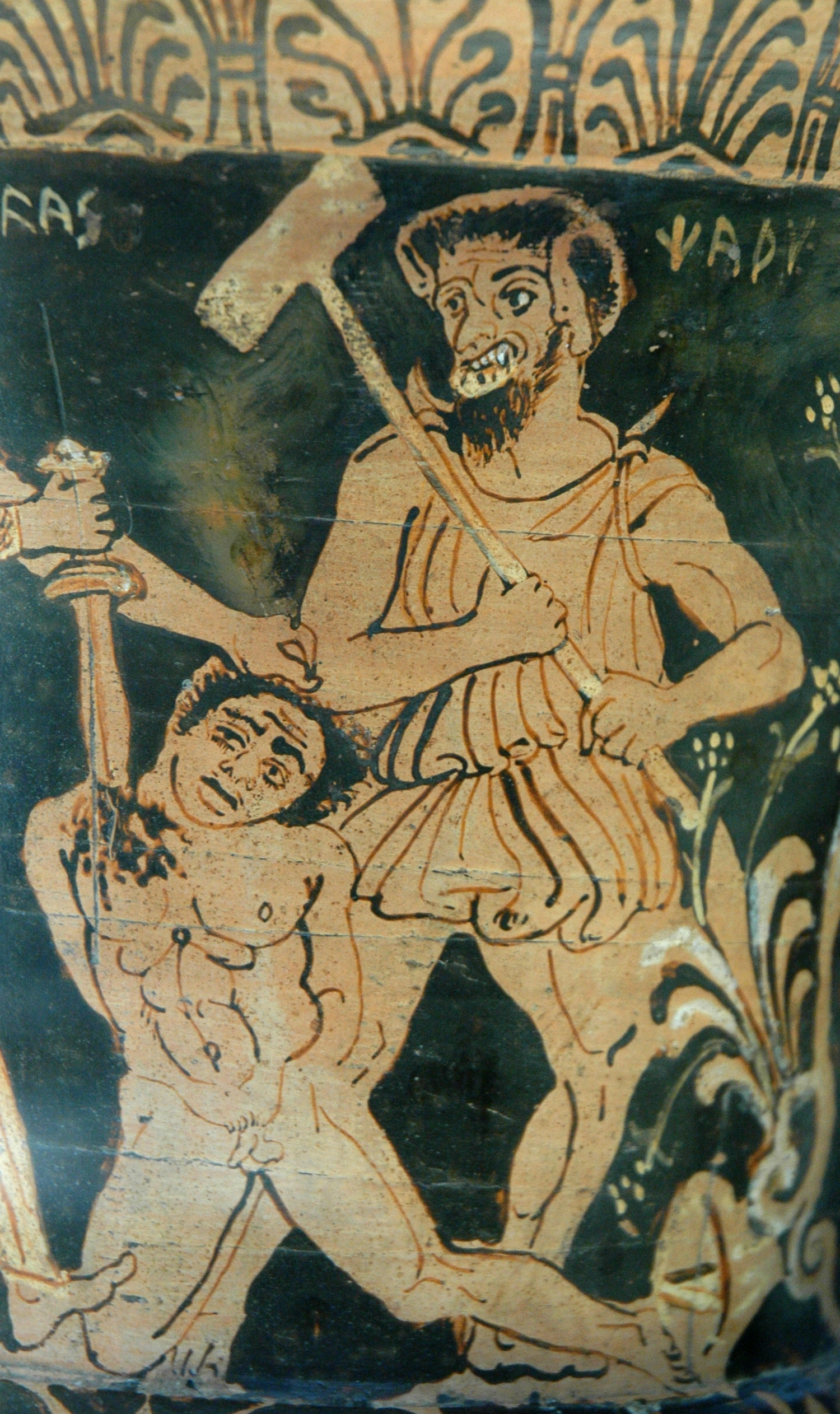
Etruscan Charun presiding over an execution

=== Christianization ===
Christian writers of late antiquity sought to discredit the competing gods of Roman and Hellenistic religions, often adopting the euhemerizing approach in regarding them not as divinities, but as people glorified through stories and cultic practices and thus not true deities worthy of worship. The infernal gods, however, retained their potency, becoming identified with the Devil and treated as demonic forces by Christian apologists.

One source of Christian revulsion toward the chthonic gods was the arena. Attendants in divine costume, among them a "Pluto" who escorted corpses out, were part of the ceremonies of the gladiatorial games. Tertullian calls the mallet-wielding figure usually identified as the Etruscan Charun the "brother of Jove," that is, Hades/Pluto/Dis, an indication that the distinctions among these denizens of the underworld were becoming blurred in a Christian context. Prudentius, in his poetic polemic against the religious traditionalist Symmachus, describes the arena as a place where savage vows were fulfilled on an altar to Pluto (solvit ad aram / Plutonis fera vota), where fallen gladiators were human sacrifices to Dis and Charon received their souls as his payment, to the delight of the underworld Jove (Iovis infernalis).

=== Medieval mythography ===
Medieval mythographies, written in Latin, continue the conflation of Greek and Roman deities begun by the ancient Romans themselves. Perhaps because the name Pluto was used in both traditions, it appears widely in these Latin sources for the classical ruler of the underworld, who is also seen as the double, ally, or adjunct to the figure in Christian mythology known variously as the Devil, Satan, or Lucifer. The classical underworld deities became casually interchangeable with Satan as an embodiment of Hell. For instance, in the 9th century, Abbo Cernuus, the only witness whose account of the Siege of Paris survives, called the invading Vikings the "spawn of Pluto."

In the Little Book on Images of the Gods, Pluto is described as

an intimidating personage sitting on a throne of sulphur, holding the scepter of his realm in his right hand, and with his left strangling a soul. Under his feet three-headed Cerberus held a position, and beside him he had three Harpies. From his golden throne of sulphur flowed four rivers, which were called, as is known, Lethe, Cocytus, Phlegethon and Acheron, tributaries of the Stygian swamp.

This work derives from that of the Third Vatican Mythographer, possibly one Albricus or Alberic, who presents often extensive allegories and devotes his longest chapter, including an excursus on the nature of the soul, to Pluto.

=== Medieval and Renaissance literature ===
In Dante's Divine Comedy (written 1308–1321), Pluto presides over the fourth circle of Hell, to which the greedy are condemned. The Italian form of the name is Pluto, taken by some commentators to refer specifically to Plutus as the god of wealth who would preside over the torment of those who hoarded or squandered it in life. Dante's Pluto is greeted as "the great enemy" and utters the famously impenetrable line Papé Satàn, papé Satàn aleppe. Much of this Canto is devoted to the power of Fortuna to give and take away. Entrance into the fourth circle has marked a downward turn in the poet's journey, and the next landmark after he and his guide cross from the circle is the Stygian swamp, through which they pass on their way to the city of Dis (Italian Dite). Dante's clear distinction between Pluto and Dis suggests that he had Plutus in mind in naming the former. The city of Dis is the "citadel of Lower Hell" where the walls are garrisoned by fallen angels and Furies. Pluto is treated likewise as a purely Satanic figure by the 16th-century Italian poet Tasso throughout his epic Jerusalem Delivered, in which "great Dis, great Pluto" is invoked in the company of "all ye devils that lie in deepest hell."

Influenced by Ovid and Claudian, Geoffrey Chaucer (1343–1400) developed the myth of Pluto and Proserpina (the Latin name of Persephone) in English literature. Like earlier medieval writers, Chaucer identifies Pluto's realm with Hell as a place of condemnation and torment, and describes it as "derk and lowe" ("dark and low"). But Pluto's major appearance in the works of Chaucer comes as a character in "The Merchant's Tale," where Pluto is identified as the "Kyng of Fayerye" (Fairy King). As in the anonymous romance Sir Orfeo (ca. 1300), Pluto and Proserpina rule over a fantastical world that melds classical myth and fairyland. Chaucer has the couple engage in a comic battle of the sexes that undermines the Christian imagery in the tale, which is Chaucer's most sexually explicit. The Scottish poet William Dunbar ca. 1503 also described Pluto as a folkloric supernatural being, "the elrich incubus / in cloke of grene" ("the eldritch incubus in cloak of green"), who appears among the courtiers of Cupid.

The name Pluto for the classical ruler of the underworld was further established in English literature by Arthur Golding, whose translation of Ovid's Metamorphoses (1565) was of great influence on William Shakespeare, Christopher Marlowe, and Edmund Spenser. Golding translates Ovid's Dis as Pluto, a practice that prevails among English translators, despite John Milton's use of the Latin Dis in Paradise Lost. The Christian perception of the classical underworld as Hell influenced Golding's translation practices; for instance, Ovid's tenebrosa sede tyrannus / exierat ("the tyrant [Dis] had gone out of his shadowy realm") becomes "the prince of fiends forsook his darksome hole".

Pluto's court as a literary setting could bring together a motley assortment of characters. In Huon de Méry's 13th-century poem "The Tournament of the Antichrist", Pluto rules over a congregation of "classical gods and demigods, biblical devils, and evil Christians." In the 15th-century dream allegory The Assembly of Gods, the deities and personifications are "apparelled as medieval nobility" basking in the "magnyfycence" of their "lord Pluto," who is clad in a "smoky net" and reeking of sulphur.

Throughout the Renaissance, images and ideas from classical antiquity entered popular culture through the new medium of print and through pageants and other public performances at festivals. The Fête-Dieu at Aix-en-Provence in 1462 featured characters costumed as a number of classical deities, including Pluto, and Pluto was the subject of one of seven pageants presented as part of the 1521 Midsummer Eve festival in London. During the 15th century, no mythological theme was brought to the stage more often than Orpheus's descent, with the court of Pluto inspiring fantastical stagecraft. Leonardo da Vinci designed a set with a rotating mountain that opened up to reveal Pluto emerging from the underworld; the drawing survives and was the basis for a modern recreation.

=== Opera and ballet ===
The tragic descent of the hero-musician Orpheus to the underworld to retrieve his bride, and his performance at the court of Pluto and Proserpina, offered compelling material for librettists and composers of opera (see List of Orphean operas) and ballet. Pluto also appears in works based on other classical myths of the underworld. As a singing role, Pluto is almost always written for a bass voice, with the low vocal range representing the depths and weight of the underworld, as in Monteverdi and Rinuccini's L'Orfeo (1607) and Il ballo delle ingrate (1608). In their ballo, a form of ballet with vocal numbers, Cupid invokes Pluto from the underworld to lay claim to "ungrateful" women who were immune to love. Pluto's part is considered particularly virtuosic, and a reviewer at the première described the character, who appeared as if from a blazing Inferno, as "formidable and awesome in sight, with garments as given him by poets, but burdened with gold and jewels."

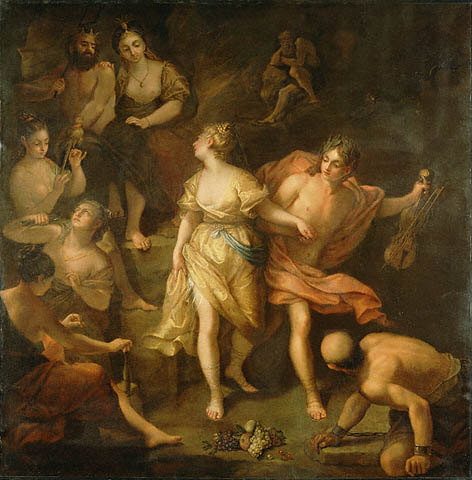
Jean Raoux's Orpheus and Eurydice (1718–20), with Pluto and Proserpina releasing the couple

The role of Pluto is written for a bass in Peri's Euridice (1600); Caccini's Euridice (1602); Rossi's Orfeo (1647); Cesti's Il pomo d'oro (1668); Sartoris's Orfeo (1672); Lully's Alceste, a tragédie en musique (1674); Charpentier's chamber opera La descente d'Orphée aux enfers (1686); Telemann's Orpheus (1726); and Rameau's Hippolyte et Aricie (1733). Pluto was a baritone in Lully's Proserpine (1680), which includes a duo dramatizing the conflict between the royal underworld couple that is notable for its early use of musical characterization. Perhaps the most famous of the Orpheus operas is Offenbach's satiric Orpheus in the Underworld (1858), in which a tenor sings the role of Pluton, disguised in the giddily convoluted plotting as Aristée (Aristaeus), a farmer.

Scenes set in Pluto's realm were orchestrated with instrumentation that became conventionally "hellish", established in Monteverdi's L'Orfeo as two cornets, three trombones, a bassoon, and a régale.

Pluto has also been featured as a role in ballet. In Lully's "Ballet of Seven Planets'" interlude from Cavalli's opera Ercole amante ("Hercules in Love"), Louis XIV himself danced as Pluto and other characters; it was a spectacular flop. Pluto appeared in Noverre's lost La descente d'Orphée aux Enfers (1760s). Gaétan Vestris danced the role of the god in Florian Deller's Orefeo ed Euridice (1763). The Persephone choreographed by Robert Joffrey (1952) was based on André Gide's line "king of winters, the infernal Pluto."

=== Fine art ===
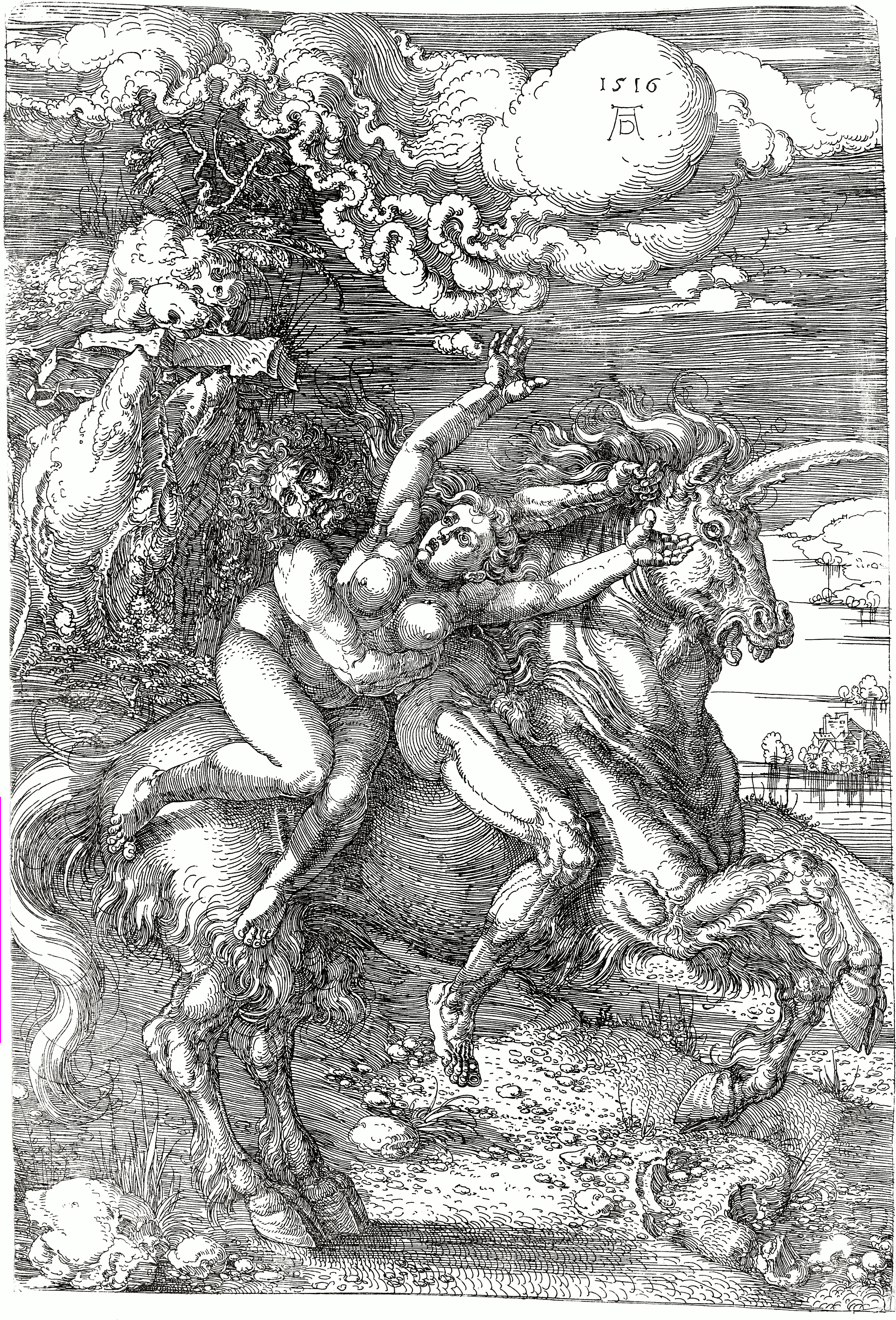
Albrecht Dürer, Abduction of Proserpine on a Unicorn (1516)

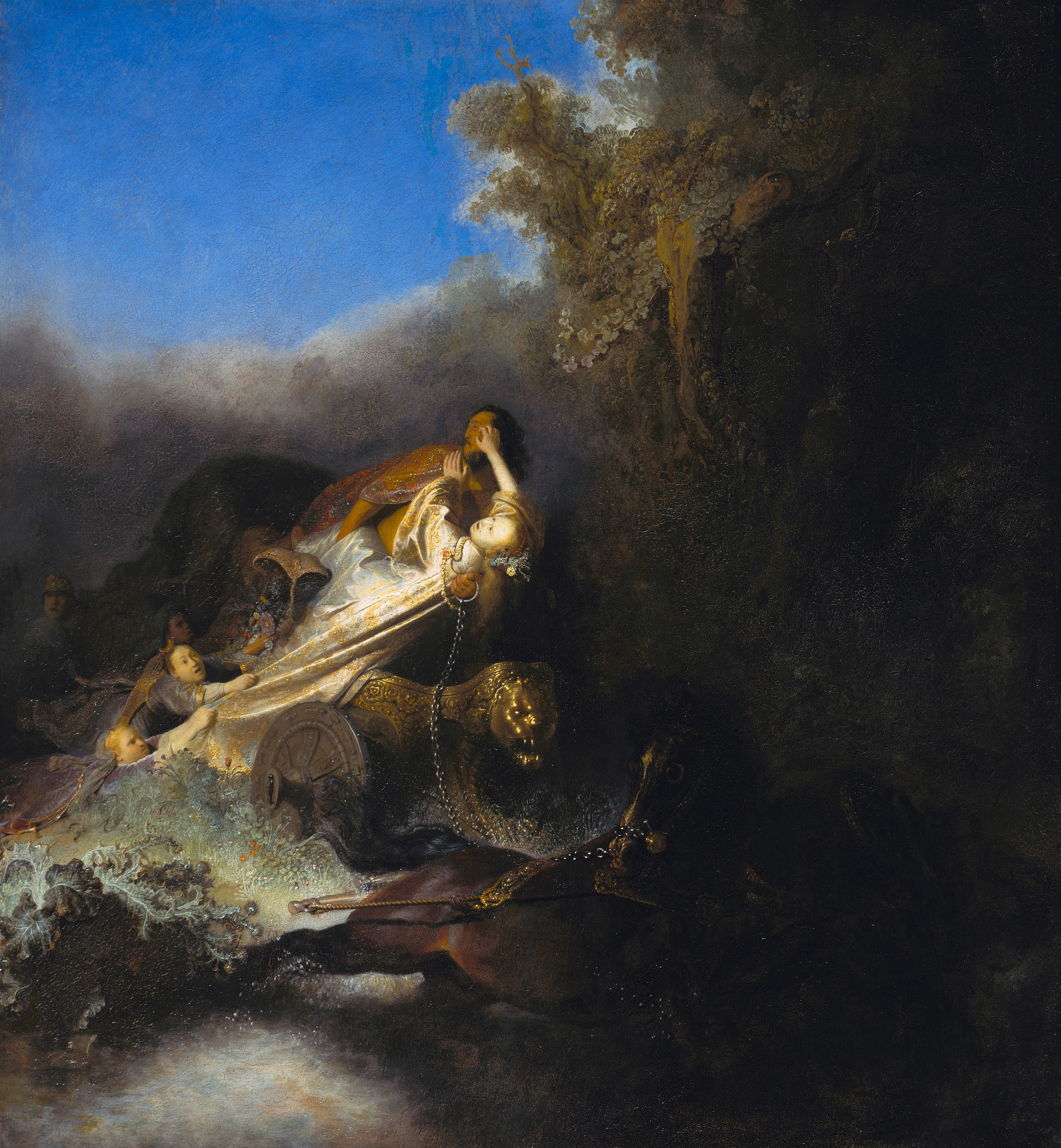
Rembrandt's Abduction of Proserpina (ca. 1631)

The abduction of Proserpina by Pluto was the scene from the myth most often depicted by artists, who usually follow Ovid's version. The influential emblem book Iconologia of Cesare Ripa (1593, second edition 1603) presents the allegorical figure of Rape with a shield on which the abduction is painted. Jacob Isaacsz. van Swanenburg, the first teacher of Rembrandt, echoed Ovid in showing Pluto as the target of Cupid's arrow while Venus watches her plan carried out (location of painting unknown). The treatment of the scene by Rubens is similar. Rembrandt incorporates Claudian's more passionate characterizations. The performance of Orpheus in the court of Pluto and Proserpina was also a popular subject.

Major artists who produced works depicting Pluto include:

- Dürer, Abduction of Proserpine on a Unicorn (1516), etching. Dürer's first English biographer called this work "a wild, weird conception" that "produces a most uncomfortable, shuddering impression on the beholder." The source or significance of the unicorn as the form of transport is unclear; Dürer's preparatory drawing showed a conventional horse. Pluto seems to be presented in a manner that recalls the leader of the Wild Hunt.
- Caravaggio, Jupiter, Neptune, and Pluto (Italian Giove, Nettuno e Plutone, ca. 1597), a ceiling mural (pictured under Theogonies and cosmology above) intended for viewing from below, hence the unusual perspective. Caravaggio created the work for a room adjacent to the alchemical distillery of Cardinal Francesco Maria Del Monte, his most important patron. The three gods hover around a translucent globe that represents the world: Jupiter with his eagle, Neptune holding a bident, and Pluto accompanied by a bluish-gray horse and a Cerberus who resembles a three-headed border collie more than a hellhound. In addition to personifying the classical elements air, water, and earth, the three figures represent "an allegory of the applied science of alchemy".
- Jan Brueghel the Elder, Orpheus before Pluto and Proserpina (1604), painting.
- Bernini, Pluto and Proserpina (1621–22), also known as The Rape of Proserpina, sculpture with a Cerberus looking in three different directions.
- Rembrandt, Abduction of Proserpina (ca. 1631), painting influenced by Rubens (via the engraving of his student Pieter Soutman). Rembrandt's leonine Pluto draws on Claudian's description of the god as like a ravening lion.

=== Modern literature ===
After the Renaissance, literary interest in the abduction myth waned until the revival of classical myth among the Romantics. The work of mythographers such as J.G. Frazer and Jane Ellen Harrison helped inspire the recasting of myths in modern terms by Victorian and Modernist writers. In Tess of the d'Urbervilles (1891), Thomas Hardy portrays Alec d'Urberville as "a grotesque parody of Pluto/Dis" exemplifying the late-Victorian culture of male domination, in which women were consigned to "an endless breaking ... on the wheel of biological reproduction." A similar figure is found in The Lost Girl (1920) by D.H. Lawrence, where the character Ciccio acts as Pluto to Alvina's Persephone, "the deathly-lost bride ... paradoxically obliterated and vitalised at the same time by contact with Pluto/Dis" in "a prelude to the grand design of rebirth." The darkness of Pluto is both a source of regeneration, and of "merciless annihilation." Lawrence takes up the theme elsewhere in his work; in The First Lady Chatterley (1926, an early version of Lady Chatterley's Lover), Connie Chatterley sees herself as a Persephone and declares "she'd rather be married to Pluto than Plato," casting her earthy gamekeeper lover as the former and her philosophy-spouting husband as the latter.

In Rick Riordan's young adult fantasy series The Heroes of Olympus, the character Hazel Levesque is the daughter of Pluto, god of riches. She is one of seven characters with a parent from classical mythology.

== Scientific terms ==
Scientific terms derived from the name of Pluto include:

- Pluto, the dwarf planet, with related terms plutoid and plutino;
- plutonium, the heaviest naturally occurring element, named after the dwarf planet;
- pluton, a geologic term;
- plutonism, a geologic theory.
