= Siege of Thebes (poem) =

Poem by John Lydgate

Siege of Thebes is a 4716-line poem written by John Lydgate between 1420 and 1422. Lydgate composed the Siege of Thebes directly following his composition of Troy Book - which was patronized by King Henry V - and directly preceding his production of The Fall of Princes - which Humphrey Duke of Gloucester patronized during King Henry VI's regency. The poem is particularly significant because it was written without an identifiable patron, and most probably without patron or commission whatsoever. Whatever the status of its patronage, the Siege of Thebes still managed to gain significant popularity, attested to by its 31 surviving manuscripts. The poem is, in large part, a response to Geoffrey Chaucer's The Canterbury Tales. Lydgate's poem borrows The Canterbury Tales' pilgrimage-based framing device and is written as an additional tale in the cycle. However, unlike Chaucer, Lydgate establishes himself as the narrator of the work, and recounts the siege of Thebes. Lydgate's Siege of Thebes follows and expands upon the Theban Cycle, but makes significant additions to the source materials.

== Criticism ==
Although literary critics generally used to believe that the work was a poor imitation of Chaucer's work rather than a work warranting criticism in and of itself, in recent years the Siege of Thebes has undergone more extensive study and some scholars have come to conclude that the Siege of Thebes indeed merits study. Apart from its complex Lancastrian and pacifist message, the text situates Lydgate as both a follower and rival of Chaucer's poetic tradition, and re-examines the way medieval patronage affected the production of poetry.

== Source materials ==
The plot of the Siege of Thebes was influenced by several sources, both classical and medieval. Classically, the plot can be traced to Statius' epic, the Thebaid and Seneca's Oedipus. However, the plot was expanded on in the Middle Ages, most notably in the 12th century French romance, Le Roman de Thébes. The plot of Lydgate's epic follows both of these sources, but integrates work from Boccaccio and the framing device used by Chaucer in The Canterbury Tales. Lydgate also was influenced greatly by Martianus Capella's De nuptiis Philologiae et Mercurii, Roman de Edipus, the Hystoire de Thebes, the Old Testament, and the New Testament. However, the poem also contains original elements and expands upon its source materials thematically.

== Modern editions ==
Only one rendition of the Siege of Thebes into modern English has been published - that by D.J. Favager: The Siege of Thebes: A Modern English Verse Rendition (Kindle 2018).
