= John Lydgate =

English monk and poet (c.1370–c.1451)

Dom John Lydgate
- Prior of Hatfield Broad Oak, Essex (1423-26)
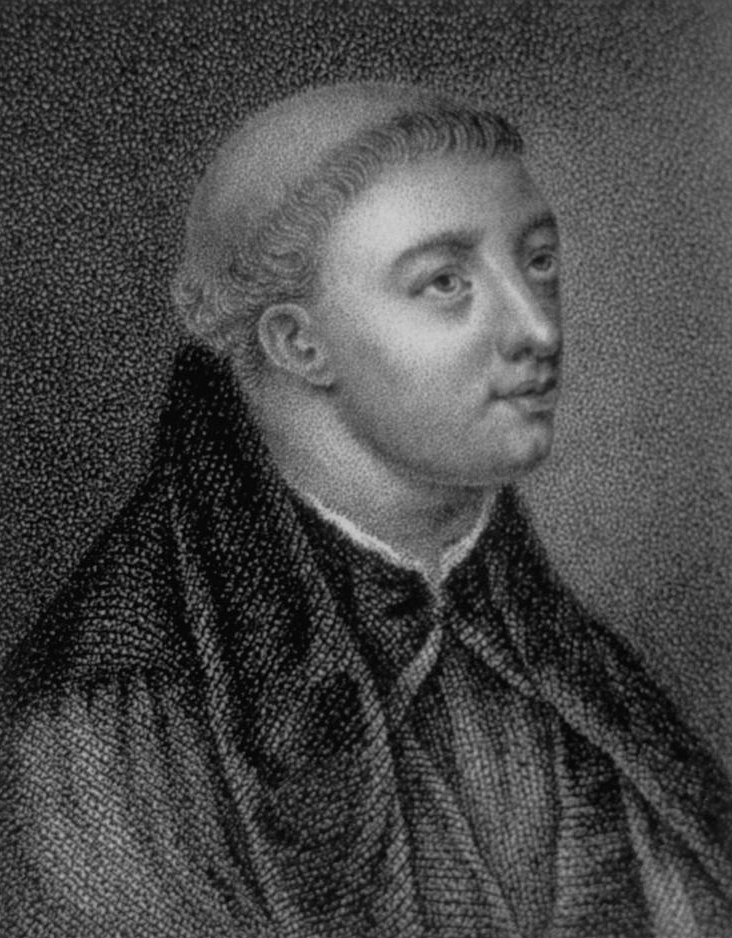
- John Lydgate's image (published in 1820)
- Church: Catholic Church

Orders
- Ordination: 1389 (as subdeacon); 1393 (as deacon); 1397 (as priest)

Personal details
- Born: c. 1370 Lidgate, Suffolk, Kingdom of England
- Died: c.1451 (aged 80–81) Bury St Edmunds, Suffolk, Kingdom of England
- Residence: Bury St Edmunds Abbey
- Occupation: Poet, Monk
- Education: University of Oxford (probably Gloucester College)
John Lydgate
- Writing career
- Years active: c. 1406-1451
- Period: Medieval
- Genres: allegories, fables, lyrics (religious & secular), narrative poems, romances
- Subjects: classical antiquity, historical narratives, religion, morality, courtly love
- Notable works: The Troy Book, The Life of Our Lady
- Movement: Chaucerian,

John Lydgate of Bury (c. 1370 – c. 1451) was an English monk and poet, born in Lidgate, near Haverhill, Suffolk, England.

Lydgate's poetic output is prodigious, amounting, at a conservative count, to about 145,000 lines. He explored and established every major Chaucerian genre, except such as were manifestly unsuited to his profession, like the fabliau. In the Troy Book (30,117 lines), an amplified translation of the Trojan history of the thirteenth-century Latin writer Guido delle Colonne, commissioned by Prince Henry (later Henry V), he moved deliberately beyond Chaucer's Knight's Tale and his Troilus, to provide a full-scale epic.

The Siege of Thebes (4716 lines) is a shorter excursion in the same field of chivalric epic. Chaucer's The Monk's Tale, a brief catalog of the vicissitudes of Fortune, gives a hint of what is to come in Lydgate's massive Fall of Princes (36,365 lines), which is also derived, though not directly, from Boccaccio's De Casibus Virorum Illustrium.

The Man of Law's Tale, with its rhetorical elaboration of apostrophe, invocation, and digression in what is essentially a saint's legend, is the model for Lydgate's legends of St Edmund (3693 lines) and St Alban (4734 lines), both local monastic patrons, as well as for many shorter saints' lives, though not for the richer and more genuinely devout Life of Our Lady (5932 lines).

== Biography ==
=== Early life and education ===
In his poem The Testament, written towards the end of his life, Lydgate admitted to all manner of childhood sins: "I lied to excuse myself. I stole apples … I made mouths at people like a wanton ape. I gambled at cherry stones. I was late to rise and dirty at meals. I was chief shammer of illness". He was admitted to the Benedictine monastery of Bury St Edmunds Abbey in 1382, took novice vows soon after and was ordained as a subdeacon in 1389. Based on a letter from Henry V, Lydgate was a student at Oxford University, probably Gloucester College (now Worcester College), between 1406 and 1408. It was during this period that Lydgate wrote his early work, Isopes Fabules, with its broad range of scholastic references.

=== Career ===
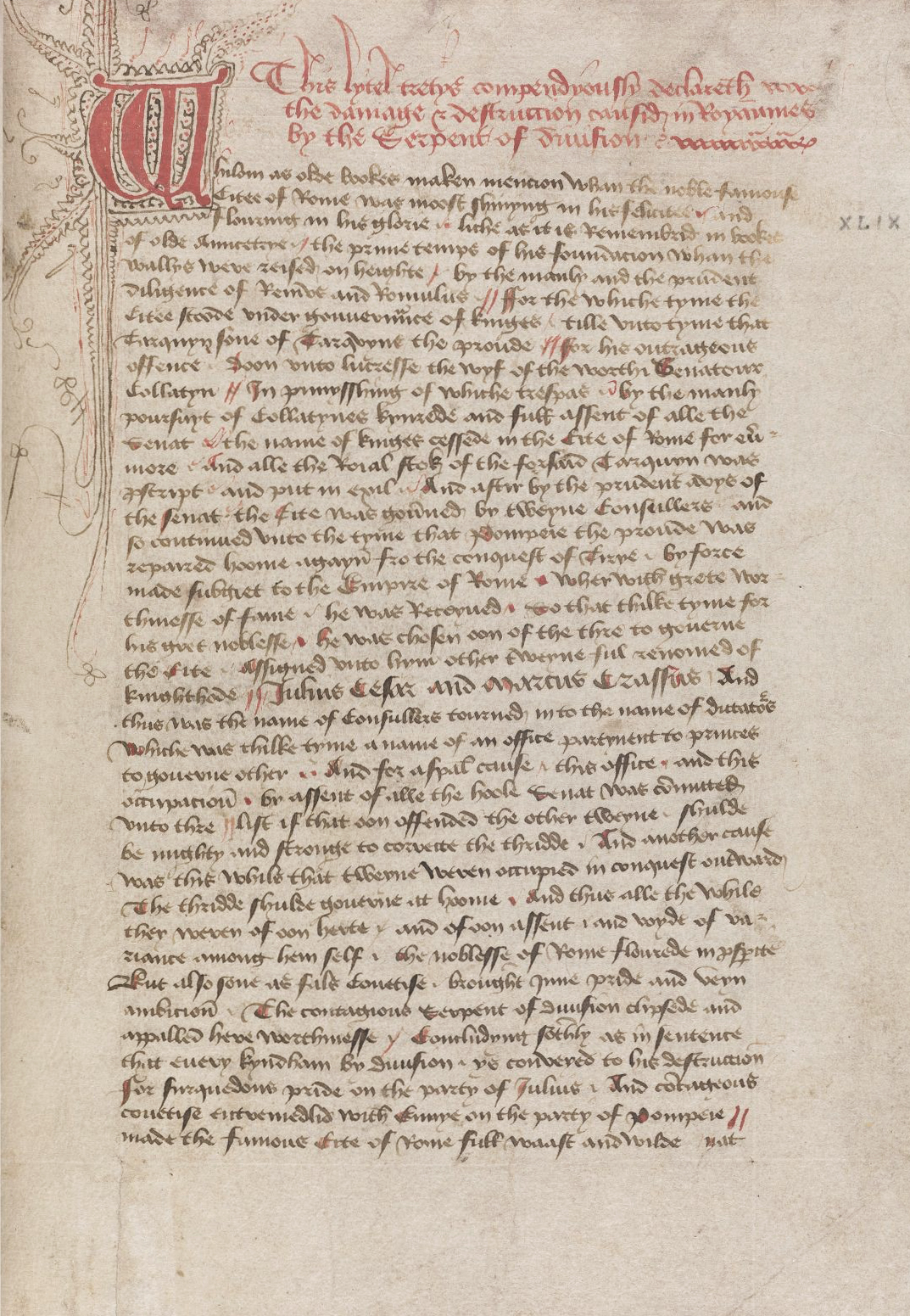
Manuscript of Damage and destruction in realmes by John Lydgate, ca. 1450, in the Houghton Library at Harvard University.

Having literary ambitions (he was an admirer of Geoffrey Chaucer and a friend to his son, Thomas) he sought and obtained patronage for his literary work at the courts of Henry IV of England, Henry V of England and Henry VI of England. His patrons included, amongst many others, the mayor and aldermen of London, the chapter of St Paul's Cathedral, Richard de Beauchamp, 13th Earl of Warwick and Henry V and VI. His main supporter from 1422 was Humphrey, Duke of Gloucester.

In 1423 Lydgate was made prior of Hatfield Broad Oak, Essex. He soon resigned the office to concentrate on his travels and writing. He was a prolific writer of poems, allegories, fables and romances. His most famous works were his longer and more moralistic Troy Book (1412–20), a 30,000 line translation of the Latin prose narrative by Guido delle Colonne, Historia destructionis Troiae, the Siege of Thebes which was translated from a French prose redaction of the Roman de Thebes and the Fall of Princes. The Fall of Princes (1431–8), is the last and longest of Lydgate's works.

Of his more accessible poems, most were written in the first decade of the fifteenth century in a Chaucerian vein: The Complaint of the Black Knight (originally called A Complaynt of a Loveres Lyfe and modelled on Chaucer's The Book of the Duchess); The Temple of Glas (indebted to The House of Fame); The Floure of Curtesy (like the Parlement of Foules, a Valentine's Day Poem); and the allegorical Reason and Sensuality.

As he grew older, his poems grew progressively longer, and it is regarding Lydgate's later poetry that Joseph Ritson's harsh characterisation of him is based: 'A voluminous, prosaick and drivelling monk'. Similarly, one twentieth-century historian has described Lydgate's verse as "banal".

At one time, the long allegorical poem The Assembly of Gods was attributed to him, but the work is now considered anonymous. Lydgate was also believed to have written London Lickpenny, a well-known satirical work; however, his authorship of this piece has been thoroughly discredited. He also translated the poems of Guillaume de Deguileville into English.

In his later years he lived and probably died at Bury St Edmunds Abbey. At some point in his life he returned to the village of his birth and added his signature and a coded message in a graffito onto a wall at St Mary's Church, Lidgate, discovered in 2014.

== Editions ==
- Henry Noble MacCracken, The Minor Poems of John Lydgate. Part 1: 1. The Lydgate Canon. 2. The Religious Poems. EETS e.s. 107. London: Early English Text Society, 1911.
- Henry Noble MacCracken, The Minor Poems of John Lydgate. Part 2: Secular Poems. EETS o.s. 192. London, Early English Text Society, 1934.
- J. Allan Mitchell, ed. John Lydgate, The Temple of Glass. Series: TEAMS Middle English Texts. Kalamazoo, MI: Medieval Institute Publications, 2007.

== Modern renditions ==
A few of Lydgate's works are available in modernised versions:

- John Lydgate's Troy Book: A Middle English Iliad (The Troy Myth in Medieval Britain Book 1) by D M Smith (2019 Kindle) – complete
- John Lydgate Troy Book: The Legend of the Trojan War by D.J. Favager (2021 Kindle) – complete
- The Siege of Thebes: A Modern English Verse Rendition by D.J. Favager (2018 Kindle)
- The Legend of Saint Alban: In a Modern English Prose Version by Simon Webb (2016 the Langley Press)
- Lydgate's Disguising at Hertford Castle Translation and Study by Derek Forbes (1998 Blot Publishing)

== Quotations ==
- "Who lesith his fredam, in soth, he lesith all."
  —an old proverb Lydgate included in his moral fable The Churl and the Bird
- Lydgate wrote that King Arthur was crowned in "the land of the fairy", and taken in his death by four fairy queens to Avalon, where he lies under a "fairy hill", until he is needed again.
- Lydgate is also credited with the first known usage of the adage "Needs must" in its fullest form: "He must nedys go that the deuell dryves" in his The Assembly of Gods. Shakespeare later uses it in All's Well That Ends Well.

== See also ==
- The Complaint of the Black Knight
