= Laurent de Premierfait =

French poet

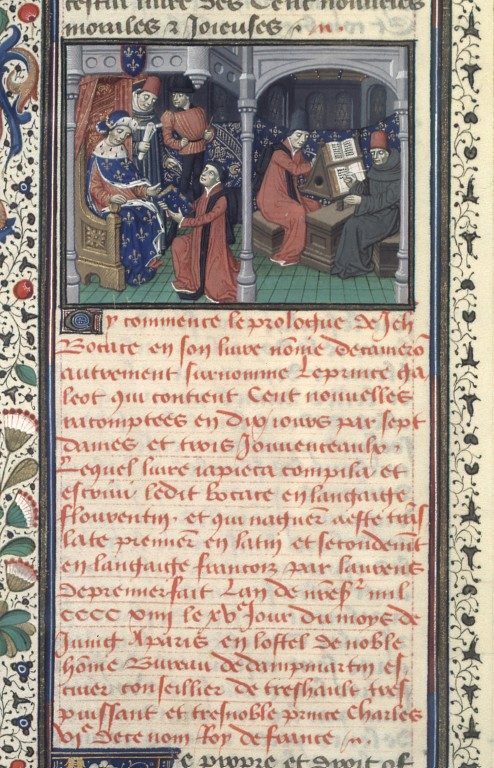
The Decameron: presentation of the book and Laurent de Premierfait writing

Laurent de Premierfait (c. 1370 – 1418) was a Latin poet, a humanist and in the first rank of French language translators of the fifteenth century, during the time of king Charles VI of France. To judge from the uses made of Du cas des nobles hommes et femmes in England, and the sheer number of surviving manuscripts of it (sixty-five in a 1955 count), it was extremely popular in Western Europe throughout the fifteenth century. Laurent made two translations of the Boccaccio work, the second considerably more free. A large percentage of surviving manuscripts are carefully written and illuminated with illustrations.

== Biography ==
Laurent was born in Premierfait, a small village near Troyes. He lived at the papal court at Avignon for a while and came shoulder-to-shoulder with other humanists while being employed by the Papal Court. Laurent was well known for translating Aristotle, Cicero, and Livy. He was also the first French translator of Giovanni Boccaccio's works. He states in one of his works that he, like his interlocutor Jean de Montreuil, was a clerc du diocèse de Troyes and secretary-notary to Jean-Allarmet de Brogny, Cardinal of Saluces. Laurent worked as well for Amadeus VIII, Duke of Savoy, Jean Chanteprime, contrôleur général des finances, and for king Charles VI. He made a living as a translator for such nobles as Louis de Bourbon, Bishop of Liège and the great collector-connoisseur, Jean, Duke of Berry, both being relatives to Charles VI. Jacques Monfrin states that Laurent's translations were not done for the general public but more for wealthy aristocratic patrons.

He may have died of the Black Death that wiped out about half of the European population recurring repeatedly from the mid fourteenth century. There is a possibility, however, that he was murdered during the invasion of Paris by the Burgundians in 1418, a result of the Armagnac-Burgundian civil war that raged in France after John the Fearless, Duc de Bourgogne, murdered the king's brother Louis d'Orléans in 1407.

A portrait of Laurent, considered to be an authentic representation, figures among the illuminations in the manuscript of Du cas des nobles hommes et femmes that was dedicated to the duc de Berry and has come with the former royal library to the Bibliothèque Nationale.

== Works of translations ==
- Aristotle

Economics (1418)

- Seneca

De quattuor virtutibus

- Cicero

De amicitia (1416)
De senectute (1405)

- Giovanni Boccaccio

De Casibus Virorum Illustrium (1400 and again in 1409)
De mulieribus claris (1405)
Decameron (1410) In this, Laurent worked from a Latin version, of which he seems to imply he is the author as well.
