= De casibus virorum illustrium =

1355-74 work of Latin biographies by Giovanni Boccaccio

- On the Fates of Famous Men
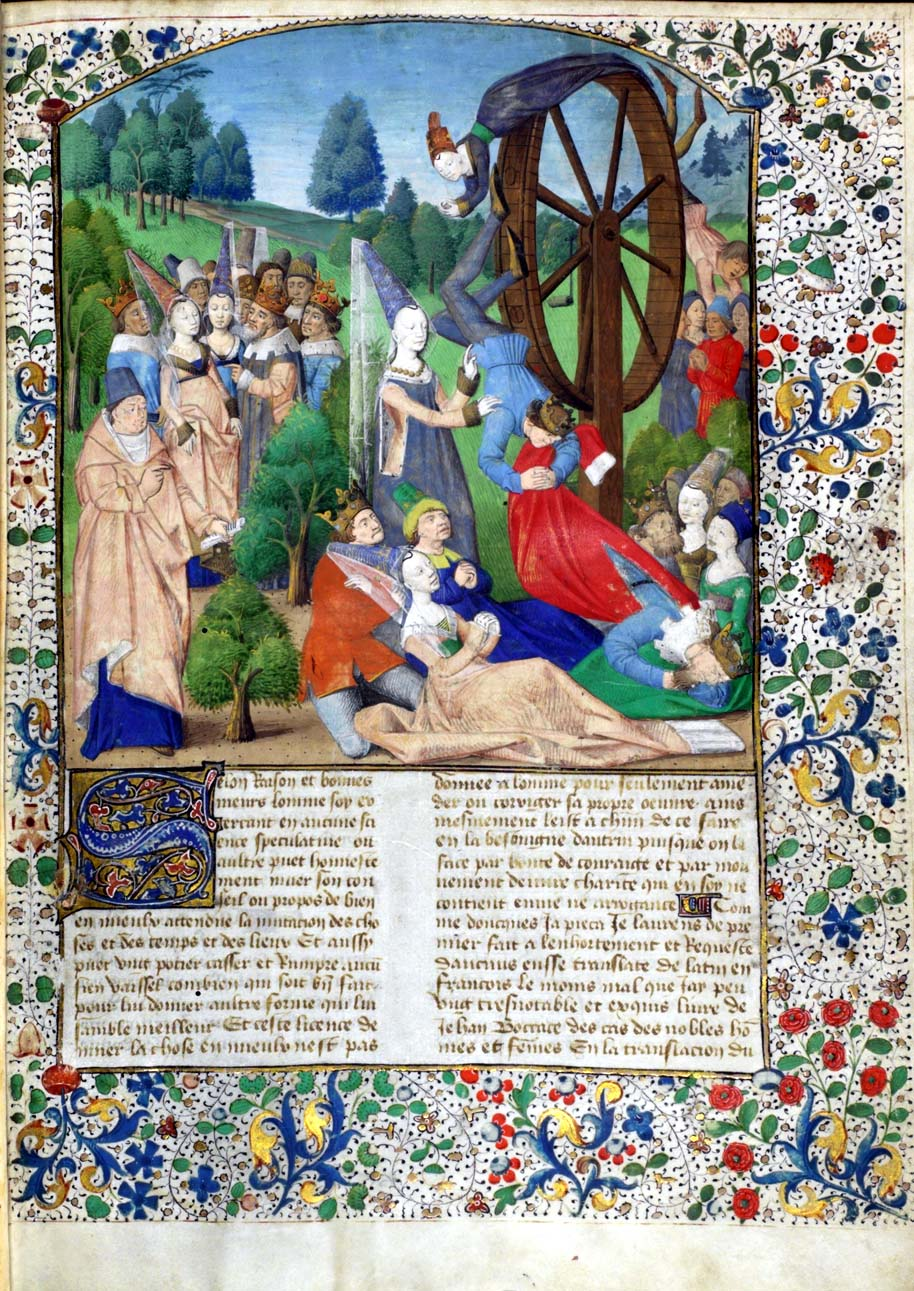
- Illuminated recto from Parisian edition (1467)
- Author(s): Giovanni Boccaccio
- Language: Latin
- Date: 1355–1374
- Provenance: Certaldo
- Genre: De viris illustribus

De casibus virorum illustrium (On the Fates of Famous Men) is a work of 56 biographies in Latin prose composed by the Florentine poet Giovanni Boccaccio of Certaldo in the form of moral stories of the falls of famous people, similar to his work of 106 biographies De Mulieribus Claris.

== Overview ==
De casibus is an encyclopedia of historical biography and a part of the classical tradition of historiography. It deals with the fortunes and calamities of famous people starting with the biblical Adam, going to mythological and ancient people, then to people of Boccaccio's own time in the fourteenth century. The work was so successful it spawned what has been referred to as the De casibus tradition, influencing many other famous authors such as Geoffrey Chaucer, John Lydgate, and Laurent de Premierfait. De casibus also inspired character figures in works like The Canterbury Tales, The Monk's Tale, the Fall of Princes (c. 1438), Des cas de nobles hommes et femmes (c. 1409), and Caida de principles (a fifteenth-century Spanish collection), and A Mirror for Magistrates (a very popular sixteenth-century continuation written by William Baldwin and others).

== Development ==
Boccaccio wrote the core of his work from about 1355 to 1360 with revisions and modifications up to 1374. For almost four hundred years this work was the better known of his material. The forceful written periodic Latin work was far more widely read then the now famous vernacular Tuscan/Italian tales of Decameron. The Renaissance period saw the secular biography development which was spearheaded partly by the success of this work being a stimulus and driving force of the new biography-moral genre.

== Purpose ==
Boccaccio's perspective focuses on the disastro awaiting all who are too favoured by luck and on the inevitable catastrophes awaiting those with great fortune. He offers a moral commentary on overcoming misfortune by adhering to virtue through a moral God's world. Here the monastic chronicle tradition combines with the classical ideas of Senecan tragedy.

== Content ==
De casibus stems from the tradition of exemplary literature works about famous people. It showed with the lives of these people that it was not only biographies, but also snapshots of their moral virtues. Boccaccio relates biographies of famous people who were at the height of happiness and fell to misfortune when they least expected it. This sad event is sometimes referred to as a "de casibus tragedy" after this work. William Shakespeare created characters based on this phenomenon, as did Christopher Marlowe.

== Lives recounted ==
In order, directly translated from Latin.

Only the historical figures whose names feature in chapter titles (i.e., whose lives are recounted more at length) are reported; the total number is far greater.

=== Book One ===
- Adam and Eve
- Nembroth
- Saturn
- Cadmus, King of Thebes
- Jocasta, Queen of Thebes
- Thyestes and Atreus
- Theseus, King of Athens
- Priam, King of Troy, and his wife Hecuba
- Agamemnon, King of Mycenae
- Samson

=== Book Two ===
- Saul, King of Israel
- Rehoboam, King of the Hebrews
- Athaliah, Queen of Jerusalem
- Dido, Queen of Carthage
- Sardanapalus, King of Assyria
- Zedekiah, King of Jerusalem
- Astyages, King of Media
- Croesus, King of Lydia

=== Book Three ===
- Tarquinius the Great, King of the Romans
- Xerxes I, King of the Persians
- Appius Claudius, the decemvir
- Alcibiades the Athenian
- Hanno, son of Hamilcar of Carthage
- Artaxerxes, King of the Persians

=== Book Four ===
- Marcus Manlius Capitolinus
- Dionysius of Syracuse
- Polycrates, tyrant of Samos
- Callisthenes the Philosopher
- Alexander, king of Epirus
- Darius, King of the Persians
- Eumenes, ruler of Cappadocia and Paphlagonia
- Olympias, Queen of Macedonia
- Agathocles, King of Sicily
- Arsinoe, Queen of Macedonia
- Pyrrhus, King of Epirus
- Arsinoe, Queen of Cyrene

=== Book Five ===
- Seleucus and Anthiocus, Kings of Asia and Syria
- Marcus Atilius Regulus
- Syphax, King of Numidia
- Antiochus the Great, King of Asia and Syria
- Hannibal, leader of Carthage
- Prusias, King of Bithynia
- Perseus, King of Macedonia
- Pseudo-Philip, King of Macedonia
- Alexander Balas, King of Syria
- Demetrius, King of Syria
- Alexander Zabinas, King of Syria
- Jugurtha, King of the Numidians

=== Book Six ===
- Gaius Marius of Arpinum
- Cleopatra
- Mithridates, King of Pontus
- Orodes, King of Parthia
- Gnaeus Pompeius Magnus
- Marcus Tullius Cicero
- Marcus Antonius the Triumvir and Cleopatra, Queen of Egypt

=== Book Seven ===
- Herod, King of the Jews
- Tiberius Caesar, Gaius Caligula and Valeria Messalina
- Nero Claudius Caesar
- Aulus Vitellius Caesar

=== Book Eight ===
- Valerian Augustus, the Roman Emperor
- Zenobia, Queen of Palmyra
- Diocletian, Roman Emperor
- Maximian Hercules, Roman Emperor
- Galerius Maximianus, Roman Emperor
- Julian the Apostate
- Radagaisus, King of the Goths
- King Arthur of the Bretons
- Rosamund, Queen of the Lombards

=== Book Nine ===
- Brunhilda of Austrasia
- Romilda
- Desiderius
- Pope John XII
- Romanos IV Diogenes
- Andronikos I Komnenos
- William III of Sicily
- Henry (VII) of Germany
- Charles of Anjou
- James Master of the Templars
- Walter VI of Brienne
- Philippa of Catania

== See also ==
- The Monk's Tale
- On Famous Women
- The Legend of Good Women
- The Book of the City of Ladies
- The Fall of Princes
