= Jean Muret =

Jean Muret (c. 1345 – c. 1420) was a French writer and humanist scholar.

Jean Muret was born in Le Mans. He established himself at the papal court in Avignon. There, he came into contact with Italian humanists, befriended Nicholas of Clamanges and formed part of a group of early French humanists that also included Jean de Montreuil and Gontier Col. A single work by Muret, De contemptu mortis, has survived.
