= The Assembly of Gods =

Fifteenth-century Middle English dream vision poem

The Assembly of Gods is a fifteenth-century dream vision poem by an unknown author (it was originally attributed to John Lydgate, but scholars now agree that is unlikely that he wrote it). The poem, which includes many of the standard allegorical forms of its day, was quite popular when it was first published in printed form by Wynken de Worde, but has since fallen out of favor.

== Summary ==
The Assembly of Gods is composed of 301 seven line stanzas which have the standard ABABBCC rhyme pattern of the rhyme royal. The meter, as critics have noted, is irregular. The poem can be broken into five main sections: an introduction, three distinct but connected narrative episodes and a conclusion.

In the introduction, the poet establishes the setting using conventional astrological and geographical references which place the poem within the traditional framework of a dream poem and introduces the dreamer who sits "all solytary alone besyde a lake,/ Musyng on a maner how that I myght make/ Reason & Sensualyte in oon to acorde" (1). But, before he can think through his puzzle he is overcome by sleep. Morpheus comes and escorts him to the court of Minos which is being held at the estate of Pluto. There the dreamer watches as Diana and Neptune accuse Aeolus of flouting their authority and discrediting them in the eyes of their worshippers. Before the trial can be concluded a messenger comes from Apollo, asking Minos to hold off on the judgement and inviting all the gods to his palace for a banquet. In Apollo's palace, Diana's complaint is resolved and the dreamer describes each of the gods and goddesses as they sit down to eat. The gods won't allow Discord into their feast, but as she is leaving she meets with Atropos and sends him to stir things up. Atropos goes to the gods and complains that while the gods claim to have given him power to bring death to any who disobeyed or despised them, there is one person who has escaped his power. He threatens to leave their employ if they don't make good on their promise to him and give him power over this person. All the gods agree that they will bring down this one who defies Atropos. They quickly resolve the dispute between Neptune and Aeolus to ensure that the offender will not be able to escape in the sea or air and then ask who it is that has defied them. When Atropos tells them that it is Virtue, Pluto says he knows him well and the only thing that can harm Virtue is Vice, Pluto's bastard son. Vice is called for, and he assembles his host for battle. Morpheus warns Virtue of the impending battle and Virtue prepares his host and heads to the field of Microcosm, hoping to arrive before Vice and thus have the advantage. The descriptions of the assembly of these armies are made up long lists of characters representing various vices and virtues and types of people under the influence of Vice and Virtue.

The second narrative episode of the poem is a psychomachian battle between the hosts of Virtue and Vice for the field of Microcosm, which is possessed by Freewill. As the battle heats up, Freewill joins forces with Vice and they begin to drive Virtue and his host from the field. Perseverance comes and rallies Virtue's troops, defeats Vice and wins the field. Freewill goes through a process of cleansing and is made a vassal of Virtue. Reason and Sadness are given control of Microcosm and set about cleansing it of the weeds planted there by Sensuality. A disgusted Atropos determines to leave the service of the "counterfete" gods saying, "For oo God ther ys that can euery dell / Turne as hym lyst, bothe dry & whete, / In to whos seruyce I shall assay to gete" (39). He goes in search of the Lord of Light and is told by Righteousness that the Lord of Light has been his master all along. Atropos' name is changed to Death and he is sent to Microcosm. Priesthood and the sacraments are sent to the field to prepare it for the coming of Death who causes the grass to wither and shuts the gates on the field.

The third episode of the poem takes place in the arbor of Doctrine where the dreamer is taken to be instructed in the meaning of the vision he has seen. The walls of the arbor are painted with images of people from the history of the world which Doctrine uses to explain the meaning of the dream and the genesis of the pagan deities and to encourage the dreamer in the right way of life. When she is done, the dreamer remembers his question about the accord of reason and sensuality and he asks her to "determyne that doute" (56). She is surprised that he has not figured it out yet, and with that, Death appears. As the dreamer hides in fear of Death, Reason and Sensuality appear and agree that people should fear death.

After Doctrine explains this accord to the dreamer he is taken back to his spot by the lake. He awakens and writes his dream, exhorting those who read it, hear it read or see it to learn from it and asking the blessings of heaven on those who do.

== Authorship and date ==
The authorship and the exact date and of the poem are unknown though both questions have enjoyed considerable speculation. In his first printing of the poem, de Worde added the colophon 'Thus endeth this lytyll moralized treatyse compiled by dan Iohn Lydgat somtyme monke of Bury on whose soule have mercy.' He removed the colophon in later printings, but early catalogers of the poem perpetuated the attribution of the poem to Lydgate (Lydgate Assembly xi). Triggs argued for Lydgate's authorship in his introduction, but scholars since that time have challenged the attribution so convincingly that the poem is no longer considered part of the Lydgate canon.

The belief that Lydgate was the author of the poem heavily influenced early attempts to fix a date for the writing of the poem, as scholars speculated about which period of Lydgate's writings the poem seemed most likely to have come from. More recent attempts to fix the date of the poem suggest that it was probably written after Lydgate's death, in the second half of the fifteenth century.

== Manuscripts ==
The Assembly of Gods exists in two early manuscripts, which Triggs calls Text A and Text B, and in several early printed versions of which the first was done in 1498 by Wynken de Worde. Differences between versions suggest that Text A was the source for the printed versions and that Text B was copied from one of them. The multiple printings of the poem at the end of the 15th and into the 16th centuries indicate the early popularity it enjoyed.

== Title ==
Text A originally contained no title for the work. Each printing and cataloguing seems to have used a slightly different title for the poem, including The Assemble of Goddis and Goddesses, The Interpretation of the names of Goddes and Goddesses, Banket of Gods and Goddesses with a discourse on Reason and Sensualitie, and Discord between Reason and Sensualitie (Lydgate x-xi). Since the publication of Triggs' edition, The Assembly of Gods has been the title used most commonly for the work, though some recent scholars have used the title The Assembly of the Gods.

== Critical response ==
J. Schick seems to have aroused a renewed modern interest in the poem toward the end of the nineteenth century. In his introduction to Lydgate's Temple of Glas (1891) he mentions The Assembly of Gods in his "Chronology of Lydgate's Writings" (cix-cx) and in his discussion of sources that Lydgate drew on in his works (cxvii). He raises the question of whether Lydgate wrote the poem or not, talks briefly about the manuscript and printings and connects the poem with Prudentius' Psychomachia. It is his work that encouraged Oscar Lovell Triggs to make his edition of the poem for the Early English Text Society.

Triggs' 1896 edition of The Assembly of Gods provides the most thorough discussion of the poem. He addresses questions of manuscripts (vii-x), title (x-xi), authorship and date (xi-xiv), meter (xiv-xx), rhyme (xxi-xxix, xxx-xxxiv), alliteration (xxix-xxx), language (xxxv-xxxvii) and thematic elements and motifs (xxxvii-lxxvi). His notes (62–94) serve primarily to connect phrases and ideas from the poem with other literature of the time. His work also includes catalogues of characters (95–105), a glossary (106–114) and a collection of special phrases and proverbs found in the poem (115–16). His discussion of the poem focuses on the way that it fits into the history of English literature and its use of common motifs and techniques. Triggs' belief that the poem was written by Lydgate directly influences many of his arguments, but his work on the formal elements of the poem is valuable and his discussion of the conventional motifs is interesting and insightful.

In 1897, Frederick Klaeber wrote a review of Triggs' book which is generally positive with regard to Dr. Triggs and negative with regard to the merits of the poem. He briefly discusses some formal elements of the poem.

Albert Rudolph wrote a short work in 1909 that compares the style of The Assembly of Gods with that of works by Lydgate and argues that Lydgate was not the author of The Assembly of Gods.

In The Allegory of Love (1936) C. S. Lewis briefly describes The Assembly of Gods as "a psychomachia with trimmings" (260). He writes of the vivacity of the poem and of the "clumsy, honest poet; who was certainly not Lydgate if we judge by his metre" (262). The discussion of the poem is brief, focuses on the second episode and doesn't address the main themes of the poem in any depth.

In The Seven Deadly Sins (1952) Morton Bloomfield mentions the poem and connects the description of the gods in the first section with alchemy, but still focuses his attention on the second section of the poem. He concludes his discussion of the poem, "Although the poetry is weak, the Assembly on Gods is historically a very important example of the psychomachia theme. The battle theme . . . is handled by the author with a deftness and attractiveness which even the limping poetry and long lists of sub sins cannot entirely mar" (228).

Spivack also briefly mentions the poem in connection with psychomachia literature and the morality plays of the late Middle Ages (1958). This connection is referenced in Potter's important work on morality drama (1975), but neither author talks about the poem in any detail.

Curt F. Bühler wrote an article in 1967 for English Language Notes that connects the poem's use of the goddess Othea with Christine de Pisan's Epître d'Othéa. He notes some similarities in the way that the two works describe and explain the pagan deities they include.

In 1971 Pamela Gradon used The Assembly of Gods as an example in her discussion of the way that late medieval literature relied on shallow, static visual images and contrasts it directly with the depth and immediacy of the characters in the Psychomachia and the depth of meaning of the beasts in the opening of Dante's Divine Comedy (62–63). She also compares the way that the poem uses visual representations to The Romance of the Rose and Dante's Purgatorio (369–373).

Philippa Tristram (1976) briefly mentions the poem's treatment of the question of predestination (144–145) and the relationship between Death and Nature (179).

Alain Renoir and C. David Benson (1980) included The Assembly of Gods in their list of Lydgate's works. They include a plot summary and say that the poem "reflects most of the conventions of its genre as well as reflecting a typical Christian attitude toward the ancient gods" (1817).

In 1988, Jennifer O'Reilly included The Assembly of Gods in her discussion of the development of the medieval treatment of the virtues and vices. She reasserts the connection to the Psychomachia (59–61) and uses The Assembly of Gods as an example of the importance of penance and perseverance in late medieval works (304–305).

A. S. G. Edwards and C. M. Meale make brief mention of the transmission of the manuscript in their article on medieval book marketing (123–124).

In 1999, Jane Chance edited an edition of The Assembly of Gods with extensive notes and a thorough introduction. A review of the work by Roberta Davidson suggests that Chance's introduction focuses on what she sees as feminine elements in the poem and on the connection to Christine de Pisan's Epître d'Othéa.

== Bibliography ==
- Benson, C. David. and Alain Renoir. A Manual of the Writings in Middle English 1050-1500. Ed. Albert E. Hartung. Vol. 6. New Haven: N.P., 1980. 1815–1817.
- Bloomfield, Morton W. The Seven Deadly Sins: An Introduction to the History of a Religious Concept, with Special Reference to Medieval English Literature. 1952. n.p.: Michigan State UP, 1967.
- Bone, Gavin. "Extant Manuscripts Printed from by Wynkyn de Worde." Library 4 (1931–32) 284–306.
- Bühler, Curt F. "The Assembly of Gods and Christine de Pisan." English Language Notes. 4 (1967) 251–254.
- Chance, Jane, ed. The Assembly of Gods. Kalamazoo: Medieval Institute Publications, 1999.
- Reimer, Stephen, ed. The Canon of John Lydgate Project. 10 Sept. 1997. U of Alberta. 20 Jan. 2000. https://www.ualberta.ca/~sreimer/lydgate.htm.
- Ebin, Lois A. John Lydgate. Boston: Twayne, 1985.
- Edwards, A. S. G. "Additions and Corrections to the Bibliography of John Lydgate." Notes and Queries 7 (1985) 450–452.
- Edwards, A. S. G. and C. M. Meale. "Marketing of Printed Books in Late Medieval England." Library 15 (1993) 95–124.
- James, Montague Rhodes, ed. The Western Manuscripts in the Library of Trinity College Cambridge A Descriptive Catalogue. Vol. 2. Cambridge: Cambridge UP, 1901.
- Klaeber, Frederick. "Triggs, Oscar Lovell, The Assembly of Gods (book review)." Modern Language Notes. 12 (1897): 116–119.
- Lewis, C. S. The Allegory of Love. 1936. London: Oxford UP, 1976.
- Lydgate, John. The Assembly of Gods or The Accord of Reason and Sensuality in the Fear of Death. Ed. Oscar Lovell Triggs. Early English Text Soc. 69. 1895. Kraus Reprint, 1981.
- MacCracken, Henry Noble, ed. The Minor Poems of John Lydgate. Early English Text Soc. 107. London: Paul, 1911.
- O'Reilly, Jennifer. Studies in the Iconography of the Virtues and Vices in the Middle Ages. New York: Garland, 1988.
- Pearsall, D. A. Old English and Middle English Poetry. London: Routledge, 1977.
- Potter, Robert, The English Morality Play: Origins, History and Influence of a Dramatic Tradition. London: Routledge, 1975.
- Rudolph, Albert. Lydgate und die Assembly of Gods. Eine Untersuchung über die Autorshaft dieses Werkes auf Grund einer Stilvergleichung. Berlin: Trenkel, 1909.
- Schick, J., ed. Lydgate's Temple of Glas. Early English Text Soc. 60. 1891. London: Oxford UP, 1924.
- Schirmer, W. F. John Lydgate: a Study in the Culture of the Fifteenth Century. Trans. Ann E. Keep. Berkeley: U of California P, 1961.
- Spivack, Bernard. Shakespeare and the Allegory of Evil: The History of a Metaphor in Relation to his Major Villains. New York: Columbia UP, 1958.
- Tristram, Philippa. Life and Death in Medieval English Literature. London: Elek, 1976.
