= Jean de Montreuil =

Jean de Montreuil (1354, Monthureux-le-Sec – 29 May 1418, Paris) was a French scholar of the late 14th and early 15th century and a friend of Laurent de Premierfait and Jean Muret.

== Life ==
He was among the first to invoke Salic Law as a reasoning against female succession to the throne. He used its implications to argue against the claims of Henry IV of England, who was also patron of Christine de Pizan, the scholar with whom Montreuil often debated over the proper conduct and role of women in the monarchy and society in general.

== Sources ==
- 'Jhesu Nichil Est Commune Ligurgo': A French Humanist Debate of ca. 1405 by Grover C. Furr
- Grover C. Furr, The Quarrel of the Roman de la Rose and Fourteenth Century Humanism. Unpublished Ph.D. dissertation, Princeton University, January 1979.
- Ezio Ornato (c. 1405) Jean Muret et Ses Amis Nicolas de Clamanges et Jean de Montreuil (Geneva: Droz. 1969)
