= Natalis Comes =

Italian poet and humanist

Natale Conti
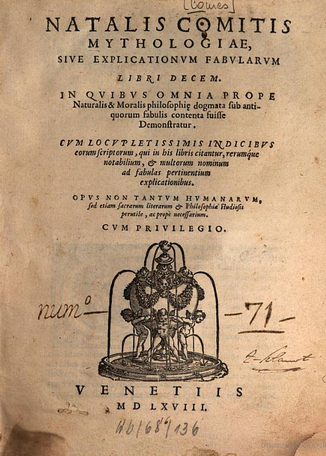
- Title page of the second edition of Mythologiae sive Explicationum fabularum libri decem (1568)
- Born: 1520; Milan, Duchy of Milan
- Died: 1582 (aged 61–62); Milan, Duchy of Milan
- Occupations: Writer, historian, mythographer
- Known for: Mythologiae (1567)

Natale Conti or Latin Natalis Comes, also Natalis de Comitibus and French Noël le Comte (1520 – 1582), was an Italian mythographer, poet, humanist and historian. His major work Mythologiae, ten books written in Latin, was first published in Venice in 1567 and became a standard source for classical mythology in later Renaissance Europe. It was reprinted in numerous editions; after 1583, these were appended with a treatise on the Muses by Geoffroi Linocier. By the end of the 17th century, his name was virtually synonymous with mythology: a French dictionary in defining the term mythologie noted that it was the subject written about by Natalis Comes.

Conti believed that the ancient poets had meant for their presentations of myths to be read as allegory, and accordingly constructed intricate genealogical associations within which he found layers of meaning. Since Conti was convinced that the lost philosophy of Classical Antiquity could be recovered through understanding these allegories, "The most apocryphical and outlandish versions of classical and pseudo-classical tales," notes Ernst Gombrich, "are here displayed and commented upon as the ultimate esoteric wisdom."

Taking a Euhemeristic approach, Conti thought that the characters in myth were idealized human beings, and that the stories contained philosophical insights syncretized through the ages and veiled so that only "initiates" would grasp their true meaning. His interpretations were often shared by other Renaissance writers, notably by Francis Bacon in his long-overlooked De Sapientia Veterum, 1609. In some cases, his interpretation might seem commonplace even in modern mythology: for Conti, the centaur represents "man's dual nature," both animal passions and higher intellectual faculties. Odysseus, for instance, becomes an Everyman whose wanderings represent a universal life cycle:

Conti creates an ahistorical mythology that he hopes will reconnect his readers to their own primordial archetypal hero. He assumed that his readers wanted to see their reflections in the literary mirror of the archetypal Greek hero, but when gazing into such a 'mirror,' the reflection must be divested of its particular ethnicity and historicity. For Conti, myth was a literary artifact on which the mythographer could freely use his imagination to reinvent the literal subject matter into a kind of 'metatext,' which the interpreter reconstructs into his idealized self-imaging text.

Despite or because of its eccentricities, the Mythologiae inspired the use of myth in various art forms. A second edition, printed in Venice in 1568 and dedicated to Charles IX, like the first edition, was popular in France, where it served as a source for the Ballet comique de la Reine (1581), part of wedding festivities at court. The Ballet was a musical drama with dancing set in an elaborate recreation of the island of Circe. The surviving text associated with the performance presents four allegorical expositions, based explicitly on Comes' work: physical or natural, moral, temporal, and logical or interpretive.

The allegorization of myth was criticized during the Romantic era; Benedetto Croce said that medieval and Renaissance literature and art presented only the "impoverished shell of myth." The 16th-century mythological manuals of Conti and others came to be regarded as pedantic and lacking aesthetic or intellectual coherence.

Nor were criticisms of Conti confined to later times: Joseph Scaliger, twenty years his junior, called him "an utterly useless man" and advised Setho Calvisio not to use him as a source.

Conti, whose family (according to his own statement) originated in Rome, was born in Milan. He described himself as "Venetian" because his working life was spent in Venice.
