= The Fall of Princes =

Work by John Lydgate

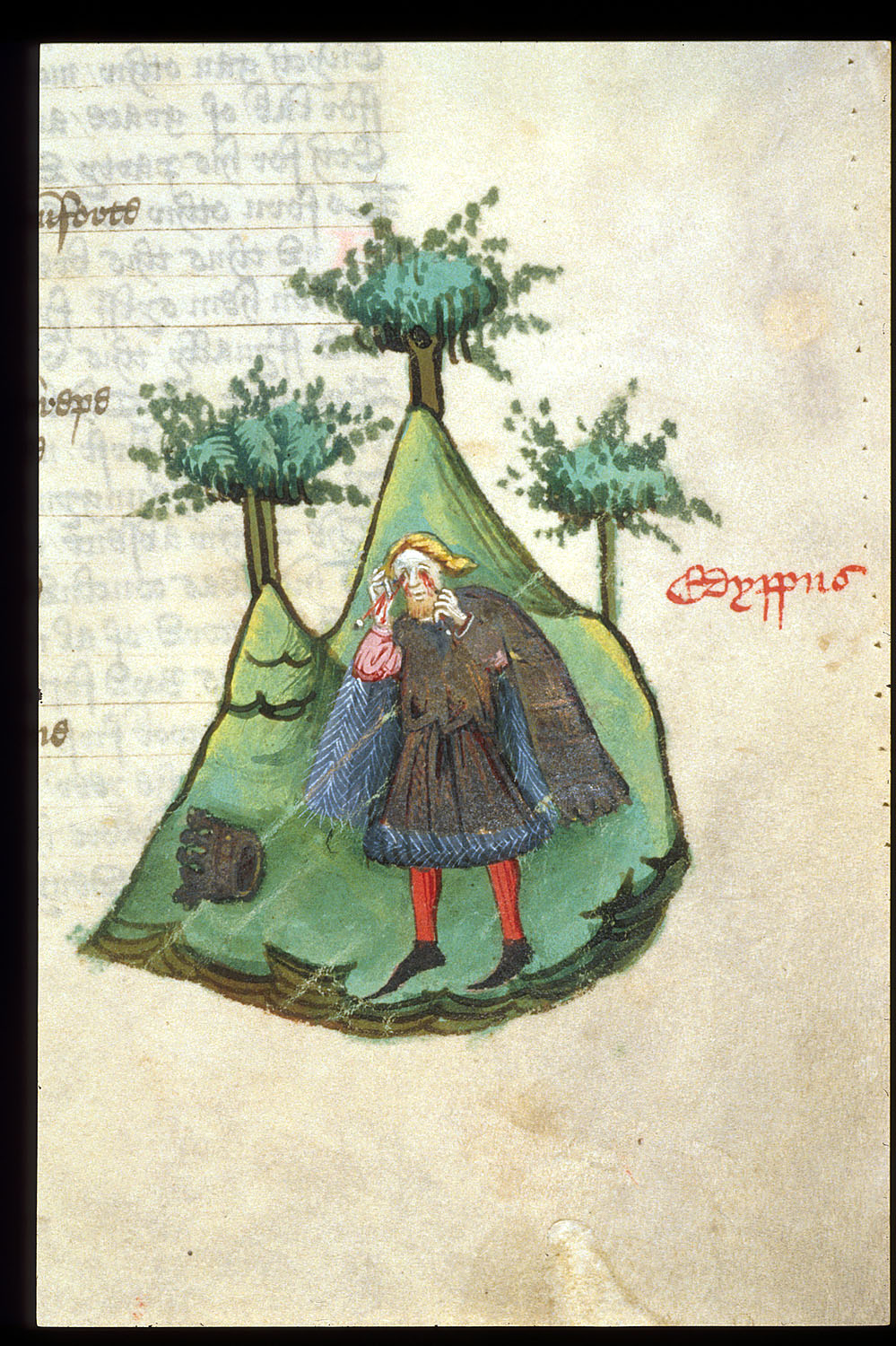
Miniature of Oedipus, dressed in royal garments, tearing out his own eyes, from John Lydgate's The Fall of Princes, England (Bury St Edmunds?), c. 1450 - c. 1460, Harley MS 1766, f. 48r

The Fall of Princes is a long poem by English poet John Lydgate. It is based on Giovanni Boccaccio's work De Casibus Virorum Illustrium, which Lydgate knew in a French translation by Laurent de Premierfait, entitled Des Cas des nobles hommes et femmes. Lydgate's poem was written in the years 1431-38. It is composed of nine books and some 36 thousand lines. It is made up of rhyme royal stanzas:

Out of her swoone when she did abbraide,
Knowing no mean but death in her distrèsse,
To her brothèr full piteously she said,
"Cause of my sorrowe, roote of my heavinesse,
That whilom were the sourse of my gladnèsse,
When both our joyes by wille were so disposed,
Under one key our hearts to be enclosed.—

The poem tells about lives and tragic deaths of many historical and legendary persons. A sixteenth-century poem The Mirror for Magistrates by various authors is a sequel to The Fall of Princes.
