= Asphodel =

Asphodel can refer to:

== Plants ==
- The genus Asphodelus
- Members of several botanical genera, especially:
  - Asphodelus aestivus, Mediterranean basin
  - Asphodelus albus
  - Asphodelus ramosus
  - Asphodeline lutea, the yellow asphodel
  - Narthecium ossifragum, the bog asphodel (Western Europe)
  - Narthecium americanum, the bog asphodel (US)
  - Triantha, the False asphodel, a genus of four species in Japan and North America

== Other uses ==
- Asphodel, a novel by H.D., written 1921–1922, published 1992
- Asphodel, a novel by Mary Elizabeth Braddon (1881)
- Asphodel Records, a.k.a. Asphodel Ltd., San Francisco–based record label
- Asphodel Meadows, a section of the underworld in ancient Greek mythology
- Asphodel-Norwood, Ontario, a Canadian municipality which includes the former Asphodel Township
- Fields of Asphodel, a 2007 novel by Tito Perdue
