= Irit =

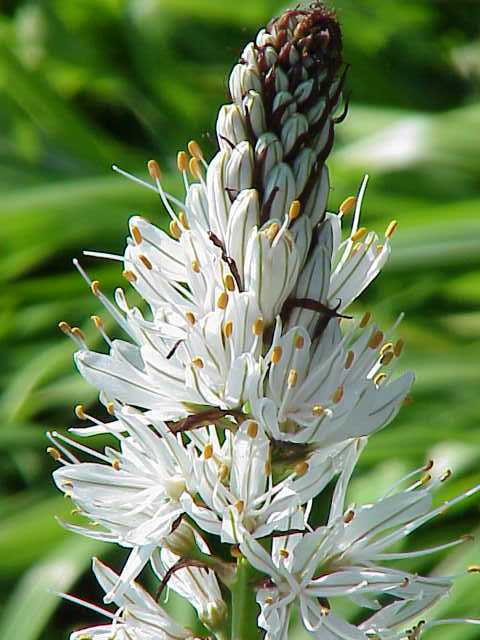
עירית

Irit, Irith are transliterations of two Hebrew feminine given names: Hebrew: עירית literally meaning "asphodel" or "chives" and its variant, Hebrew: אירית. Notable people with the name include:

== אירית ==
- Irit Amiel (1931–2021), Israeli poet, writer, and translator
- Irit Batsry (born 1957), Israeli-American visual and installation artist
- Irit Ben-Abba (born 1958), Israeli ambassador to China
- Irit Dinur, Israeli computer scientist
- Irit Efrati (born 1970), Israeli swimmer, national champion
- Irit Grenchel, Israeli international lawn bowler
- Irit Lillian (born 1962), Israeli Ambassador to Turkey
- Irith Pomeranz, Israeli electrical engineer
- Irit Rosenblum, founder of the New Family Organization, Israel

== עירית ==
- Irit Kaplan (born 1973), Israeli actress
- Irit Linur (born 1961), Israeli author
- Irit Meir (1957–2018), Israeli linguist
- Irit Rogoff, Israeli writer, theorist, teacher, and curator
- Irit Ziffer (born 1954), Israeli archaeologist and art historian
