= Pomerantz =

Pomerantz or Pomeranz may refer to the following:

- Abraham Pomerantz (1903–1982), American lawyer, father of Charlotte Pomerantz
- Charles Pomerantz (1896–1973), American entomologist
- Charlotte Pomerantz (1930–2022), American children's book author, daughter of Abraham Pomerantz
- David Pomeranz (born 1951), American singer-songwriter
- Drew Pomeranz (born 1988), American baseball pitcher
- Gary M. Pomerantz (born 1960), American author and journalist
- Hart Pomerantz, Canadian lawyer and television personality
- Irith Pomeranz, Israeli electrical engineer
- Kenneth Pomeranz (born 1958), American economic historian
- Margaret Pomeranz (born 1944), Australian film critic
- Mark F. Pomerantz (born 1951), American attorney
- Martin A. Pomerantz (1916–2008), American physicist
- Mike Pomeranz (born 1967), American TV news anchor
- Roza Pomerantz-Meltzer (died 1934), the first woman elected to the Parliament of Poland

== See also ==
- Pomerance
- Pomerants
- Pomerantsev
- Arnold Pomerans (1920–2005), German-born British translator
