= Asphodel Meadows =

Section of the Greek underworld

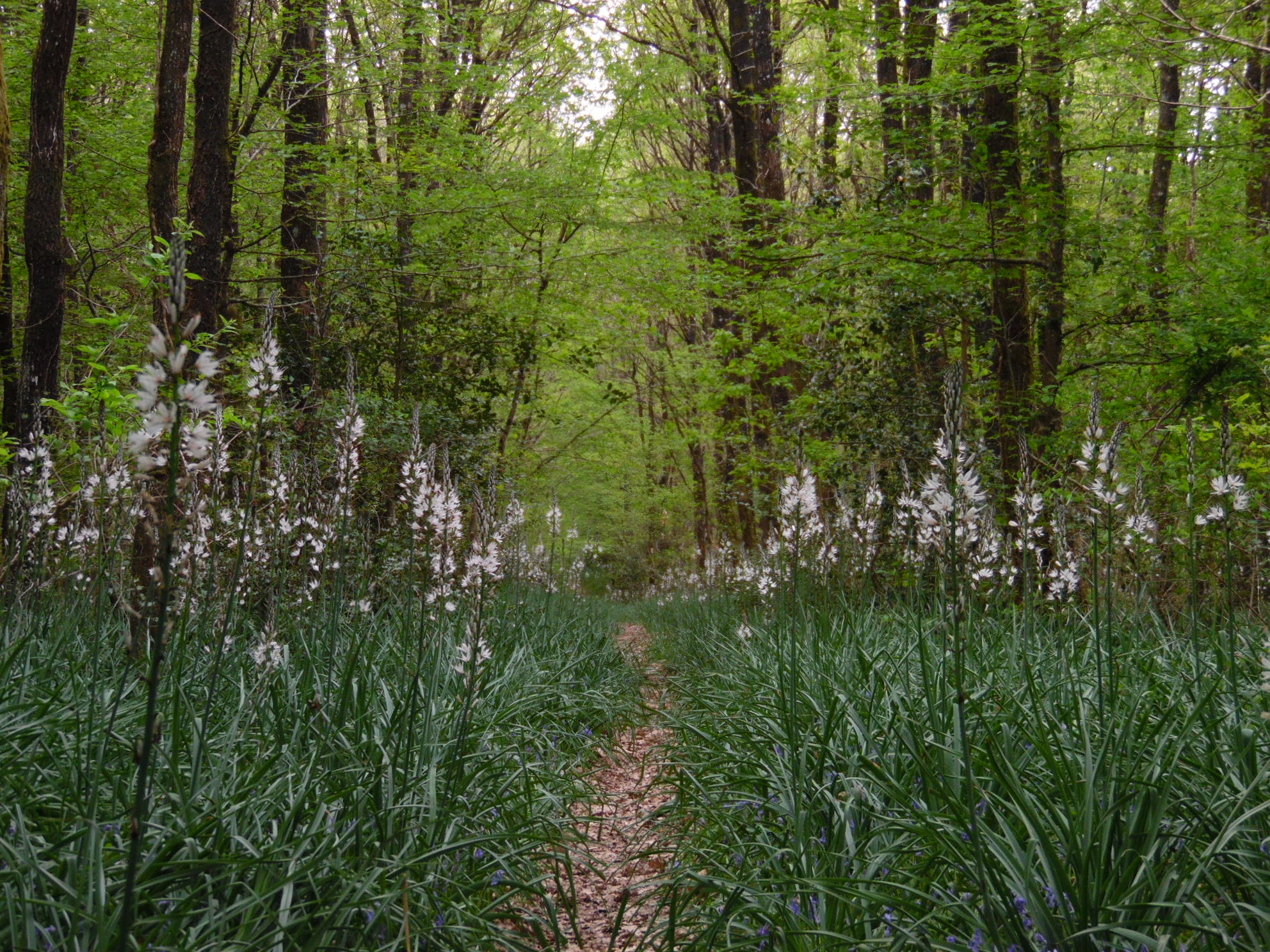
A field of white asphodels

In Greek mythology, the Asphodel Meadows or Asphodel Fields (Ancient Greek: ἀσφοδελὸς λειμών, romanized: asphodelòs leimṓn) are a section of the ancient Greek underworld where most ordinary souls are sent to live after death. They are one of the three main divisions of the underworld along with Elysium, where righteous souls are rewarded, and Tartarus, where vicious souls are punished. In his Odyssey, Homer locates the Fields of Asphodel close to the Land of dreams. He further refers to them as the dwelling place of the spirits of men who have abandoned their earthly labors.

== Name ==
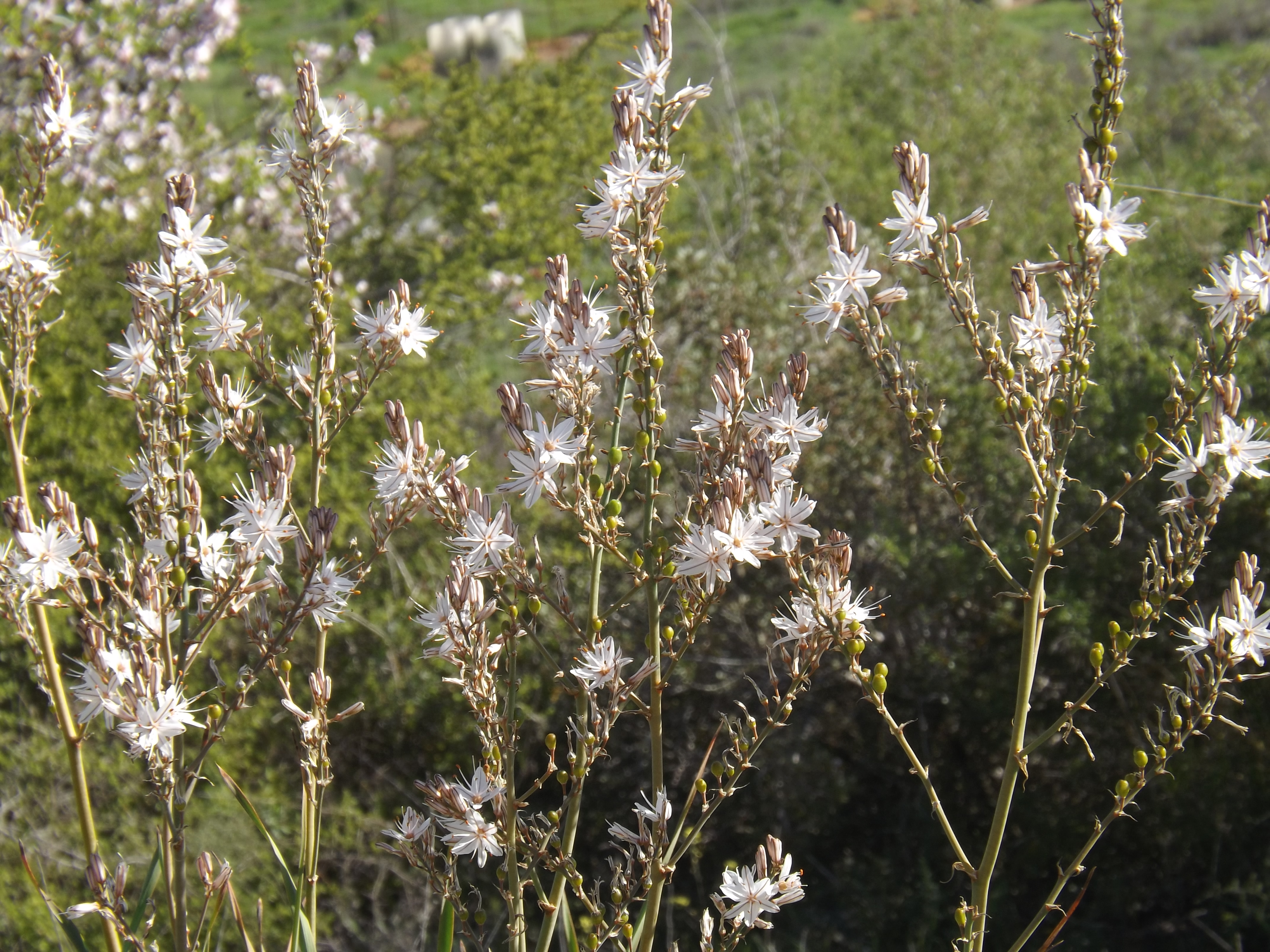
The plant Asphodelus ramosus

The name of the land, inspired by the plant Asphodelus, appears in the literature as far back as Homer's Odyssey, where it features in Odysseus' survey of the underworld. Many ancient Greek poets and Homeric commentators understand the adjective asphodelòs to mean "flowery", "fragrant", or "fertile". According to others, the unattractive plant was chosen by the Greeks because of its ghostly gray colour which is appropriate to the shadowy atmosphere of the underworld.

A different proposal explains the name of the land as "field of ashes", basing it on sphodelos or spodelos, an alternative version of the name that could be related to "σποδός", spodós ("ashes", "embers").

== Later depictions ==
The Asphodel Meadows are most probably where the souls of people who lived mediocre lives remain. Their relationship to other places in the Greek afterlife remains uncertain.

For later Greek poets, the very ancient pre-Homeric association of the asphodel flower with a positive form of afterlife, as well as the enlarged role of Elysium as it became the destination of more than just a few lucky heroes, altered the character of the meadows. Greek poets who wrote after Homer's time describe them as untouched, lovely, soft and holy. Such an evolutionary change is quite common: "Like most cultures throughout human history, both ancient and modern, the Greeks held complex and sometimes contradictory views about the afterlife".

Edith Hamilton suggested that the asphodel of these fields is not exactly like the asphodel of the real world, but are "presumably strange, pallid, ghostly flowers". Others have suggested that they were actually narcissi.

== See also ==
- Donn
- Iriy
- Brittia
- Purgatory

== Citations ==
- Hanks, Gordon R (2002). Narcissus and Daffodil: The Genus Narcissus. London: Taylor and Francis. ISBN 0415273447.
- Anonymous (May–October 1887). "Homer the botanist". Macmillan's Magazine. 56. London: Macmillan and Company: 428–436.
