= Pomerance =

Pomerance is the name of:

- Bernard Pomerance (1940–2017), American playwright and poet
- Carl Pomerance (born 1944), American mathematician
- Murray Pomerance (born 1946), Canadian film scholar
- Rafe Pomerance (1946–2026), American environmentalist

== See also ==
- Pomerants
- Pomerantz
- Pomerantsev
