= Pomerants =

Pomerants is a surname. Notable people with the surname include:

- Grigory Pomerants (1918–2013), Russian philosopher and cultural theorist
- Marko Pomerants (born 1964), Estonian politician

== See also ==
- Pomerance
- Pomerantz
- Pomerantsev
