= Asphodelus lusitanicus =

Scientific classification
- Kingdom: Plantae
- Clade: Tracheophytes
- Clade: Angiosperms
- Clade: Monocots
- Order: Asparagales
- Family: Asphodelaceae
- Subfamily: Asphodeloideae
- Genus: Asphodelus
- Species: A. lusitanicus

Binomial name
- Asphodelus lusitanicus Cout.

Species of plant

Asphodelus lusitanicus is a species of asphodel, endemic to the Iberian Peninsula.

== Taxonomy ==
Two varieties are recognised:

- Asphodelus lusitanicus var. lusitanicus.
- Asphodelus lusitanicus var. ovoideus (Merino) Z.Díaz & Valdés.
