= Land of dreams (mythology) =

Location in the Greek underworld

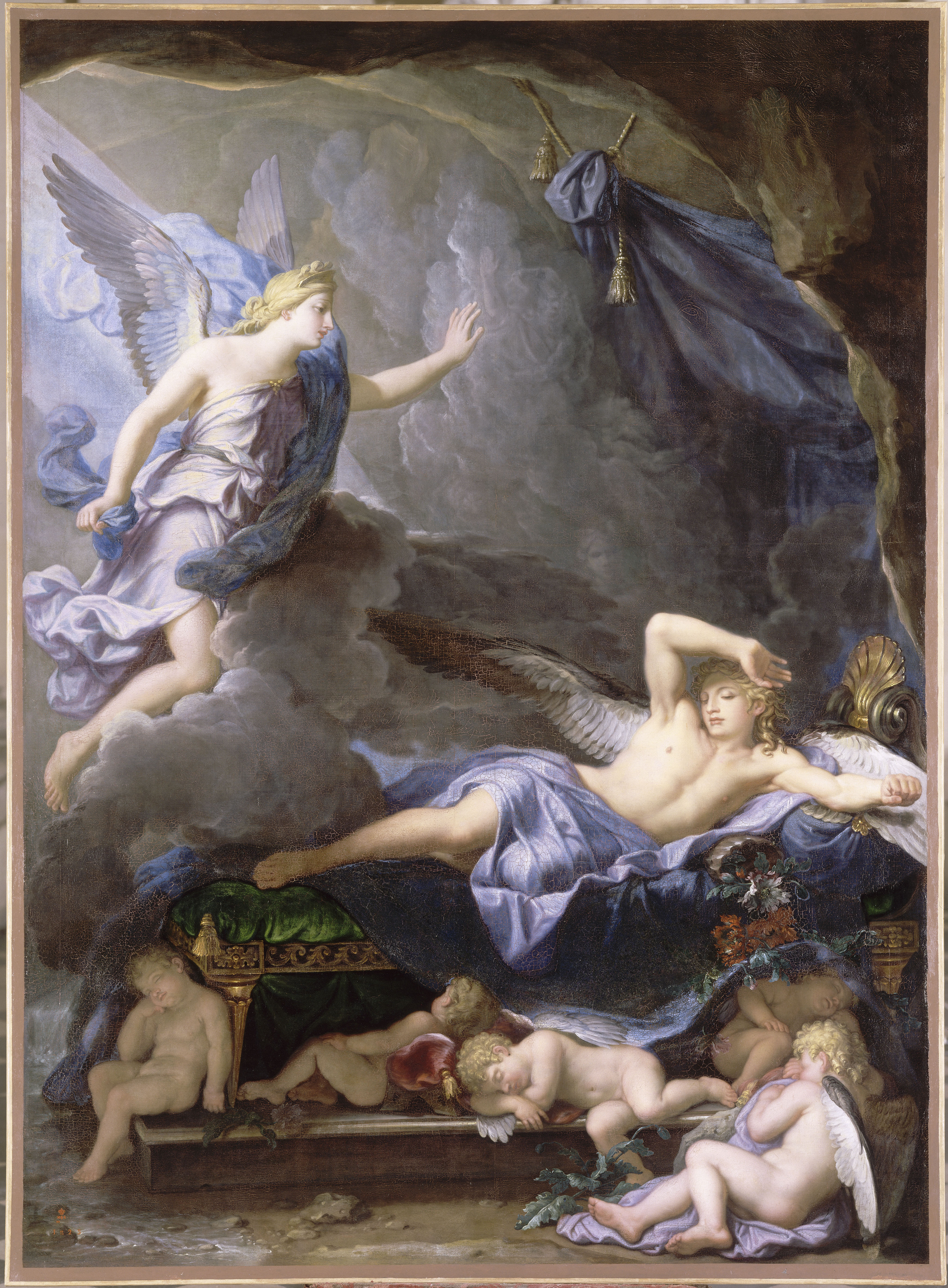
Morpheus Awakening as Iris Draws Near, René-Antoine Houasse, 1690

In Greek mythology, the Land of dreams (or District of dreams; Ancient Greek: δῆμος ὀνείρων, romanized: dêmos oneírōn) is a location in the Greek underworld mentioned by Homer in the Odyssey. Homer locates the land past the streams of Oceanus, the world-encircling river, and the gates of the Sun, close to the Fields of Asphodel, where the spirits of the dead reside. Described as "the land where reality ends and everything is fabulous", the district of dreams is situated by the stream of Oceanus, the physical boundary in cosmic space, beyond which lies the realm of images and ghosts.

== Mythology ==
=== Oneiros ===
Personifications of dreams, called Oneiros (Greek: Ὄνειρος, pl. Oneiroi), had several minor references in ancient sources and would sometimes appear in myths delivering messages to mortals in their sleep. In Hesiod's Theogony, the "tribe of Dreams" was descended from Nyx and were, among others, brothers of Hypnos (sleep) and Thanatos (death), also residents of the underworld. The Oneiroi, who dwelt on the dark shores of the western ocean, were described by Euripides as more frightening chthonic deities. In his play, Hecuba, the protagonist prays to "lady Earth (Chthon)" calling her "mother of the black-winged dreams". Euripides' Oneiroi differ from the nearly playful Homeric Dreams that are seen bending over the dreamer's head and engaging in conversations. They are described as being born out of the Earth's dark womb; they descend not from the nourishing agricultural mother Earth, but from a darker, more primordial version, known as Chthon. In Homeric texts, the Dreams are not represented as an experience, a product of an individual's subconscious, but rather as visual images, human-like figures that present themselves to the dreamer. As such, the Homeric characters speak of 'seeing' a dream, rather than 'having' one.

=== Location and description ===
The Greek word demos is translated in English-language literature with various names, such as "the Land", "the District", "the Village", "the Province", or even "the People" [of Dreams]. In Homer's Odyssey, the Land of dreams is located spatially in an imaginal landscape closely situated to the realm of the dead. It lies past the stream of Oceanus, which represented the boundary in cosmic space, beyond which the real world ends and the land of phantasy and ghosts begins. Book 24 of the Odyssey opens with a description of the journey taken by one of Penelope's slain suitors to the underworld.

Hermes, the Helper, led them down the dank ways. Past the streams of Oceanus they went, past the rock Leucas, past the gates of the sun and the land of dreams, and quickly came to the mead of asphodel, where the spirits dwell, phantoms of men who have done with toils.

— Homer, Odyssey 24.11–14

The gates of the Sun (Helios) are typically identified as the gates of the underworld. They seem to have several parallels in Homeric texts; the souls (psychae) enter the underworld through the gates, the same ones as the sun when it sets, while Hades himself is described as pylartes ("the gate-closer"). On the contrary, the "White Rock" (rock of Leucas) finds no particular parallel in Homeric diction. Regarding its association with dreams, it appears parallel to the expression found in Alcaman's Partheneion "from dreams underneath a rock". In general, the White Rock was often used in ancient Greek tradition allegorically, in order to symbolise the boundary that delimits the conscious and the unconscious, be it a trance, stupor, sleep, or even death.

=== Gates of the dreams ===
Similar to the gates of the underworld, the Land of dreams, as a district or a village, is described as having its own set of gates, through which the Dreams pass in order to visit the world of the humans. In a passage of the Odyssey, Penelope is pictured as "slumbering sweetly in the gates of dream", while in a later passage, she supplies a much more detailed description of this construct. The 'wise Penelope' explains how "the dreams are by nature perplexing and full of messages which are hard to interpret", and goes on to describe the two gates of the evanescent dreams; the truthful gate of polished horn and the deceitful gate of sawn ivory.

For two are the gates of shadowy dreams, and one is fashioned of horn and one of ivory. Those dreams that pass through the gate of sawn ivory deceive men, bringing words that find no fulfillment. But those that come forth through the gate of polished horn bring true issues to pass, when any mortal sees them.

— Homer, Odyssey 19.562–567

The dreams here are not labeled adjectivally as 'true' or 'false', but rather are distinguished with verbal phrases describing what they do after they have passed through either one of the two gates. This passage has raised a great deal of scholarly debate, starting already from antiquity, particularly regarding Homer's choice of words in order to describe the material of the gates. Some have interpreted the passage as referring to the qualities of the materials; the horn being transparent, whereas ivory is blurred and opaque. This Homeric choice, however, is most commonly explained by the resemblance in sound between the Greek words k[e]raino ('accomplish') and keras ('horn'), and similarly between elephairomai ('deceive') and elephas ('ivory'). This resemblance either made it seemingly appear as if the verbs were etymologically derived from the respective nouns, or perhaps the choice was merely a word play for literary purposes, which subsequently cannot be preserved in English.

== Ovid's Metamorphoses ==
The Roman poet Ovid describes Somnus (the Roman counterpart of Hypnos) as a slothful deity residing in the underworld inside a silent and foggy cave unreachable by the sun. His cave is located near the river Lethe and is surrounded by fields of poppies and herbs. The juices of the plants would spread over the Earth during night hours sending humans to sleep. Ovid mentions the existence of multiple Dreams (Somnia), who were sons of Sleep, moving around him in all directions taking unsubstantial forms and various shapes. Out of the 'thousand' dream deities, Ovid names Morpheus (the 'shape-shifter'), Phobetor (the 'frightener'), and Phantasos (the 'apparition').

== See also ==
- Asphodel Meadows
- Elysium
- Greek underworld

== Sources ==
=== Primary ===
- Homer, The Odyssey with an English Translation by A.T. Murray, Ph.D. in two volumes. Cambridge, MA., Harvard University Press; London, William Heinemann, Ltd. 1919. Online version at the Perseus Digital Library
- Hesiod. The Homeric Hymns and Homerica with an English Translation by Hugh G. Evelyn-White. Theogony. Cambridge, MA., Harvard University Press; London, William Heinemann Ltd. 1914. Online version at the Perseus Digital Library
- Ovid. Metamorphoses. Brookes More. Boston. Cornhill Publishing Co. 1922. Online version at the Perseus Digital Library

=== Secondary ===
- Nagy, Gregory (2018). Greek Mythology and Poetics. Cornell University Press. ISBN 9781501732027.
- Cox Miller, Patricia (1994). Dreams in Late Antiquity, Studies in the Imagination of a Culture. Princeton University Press. ISBN 9780691058351.
- Greene, Ellen (2023). Reading Sappho, Contemporary Approaches. University of California Press. ISBN 9780520918061.
- Papadogiannis, Grigorios (2018). In the province of dreams, An oneiric exploration of the unconscious. Πρότυπες εκδόσεις πηγή. ISBN 9789606270413.
