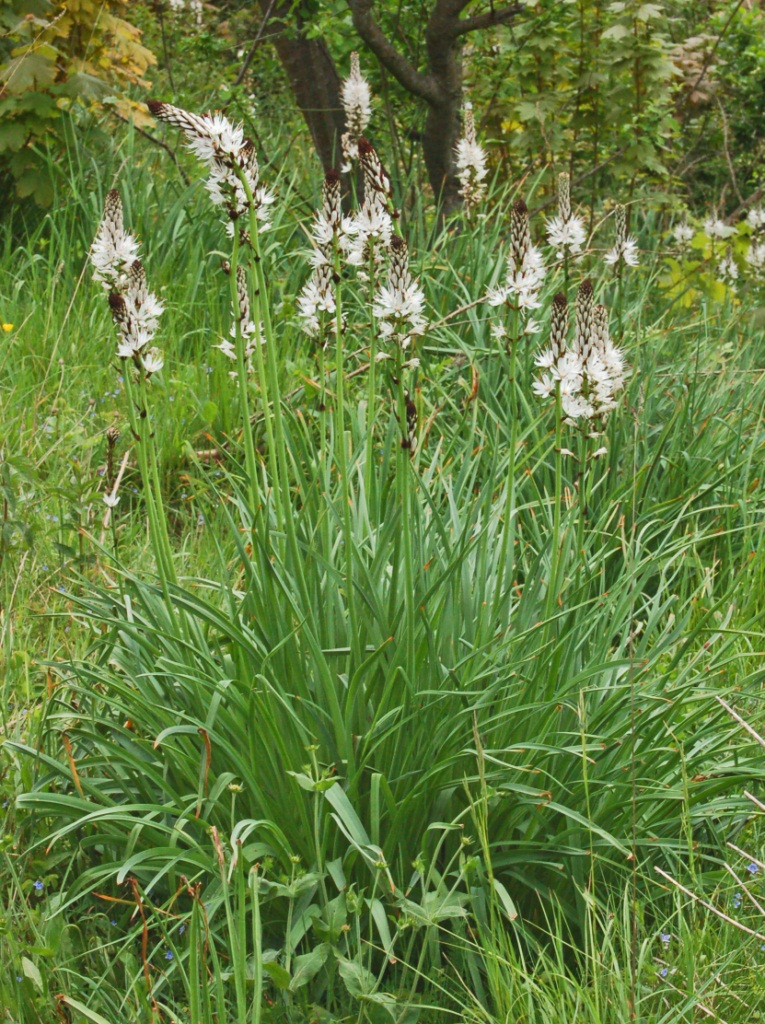
- Plant of Asphodelus macrocarpus

Scientific classification
- Kingdom: Plantae
- Clade: Embryophytes
- Clade: Tracheophytes
- Clade: Spermatophytes
- Clade: Angiosperms
- Clade: Monocots
- Order: Asparagales
- Family: Asphodelaceae
- Subfamily: Asphodeloideae
- Genus: Asphodelus
- Species: A. macrocarpus

Binomial name
- Asphodelus macrocarpus Parl.

= Asphodelus macrocarpus =

Species of flowering plant

Asphodelus macrocarpus is a herbaceous perennial plant belonging to the genus Asphodelus of the Asphodelaceae family. The Latin name macrocarpus of this species derives from the Greek μακρός (meaning large) and καρπειον (meaning fruit), referred to the size of the fruits.

== Description ==
Asphodelus macrocarpus grows to a height of 60–150 centimetres (24–59 in). The stem is erect, plain, cylindrical and glabrous. It is supported by fleshy, thickened roots (rhizomes). All the leaves are basal, gutter-shaped and covered by a greyish waxy coating. They are about 10–40 millimetres (0.39–1.57 in) wide and 50–100 centimetres (20–39 in) long. The terminal raceme is almost cylindrical, about 25–35 centimetres (9.8–13.8 in) long. The flowers are hermaphroditic, funnel-shaped, about 4 centimetres (1.6 in) of diameter, with six elongated white petals. The stamens have a white filament of about 17 mm. Anthers are oval, yellow- orange 2.5 millimetres (0.098 in) long. The flowering period extends from late April through June. The egg-shaped yellow-green seed capsules are about 18 millimetres (0.71 in) long.

== Gallery ==
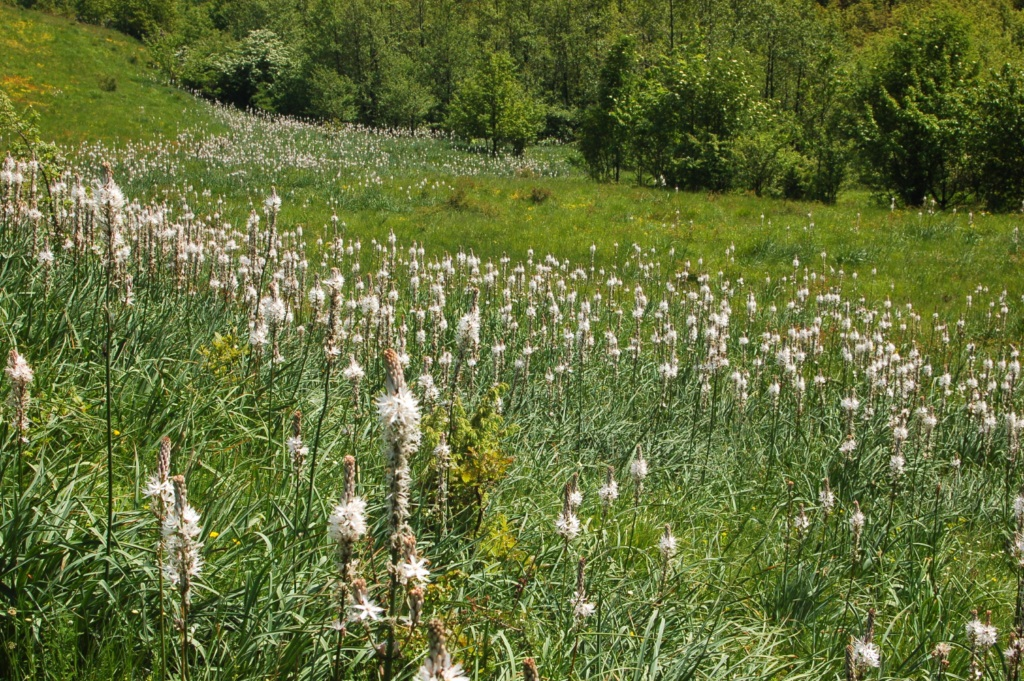
Plants of Asphodelus macrocarpus

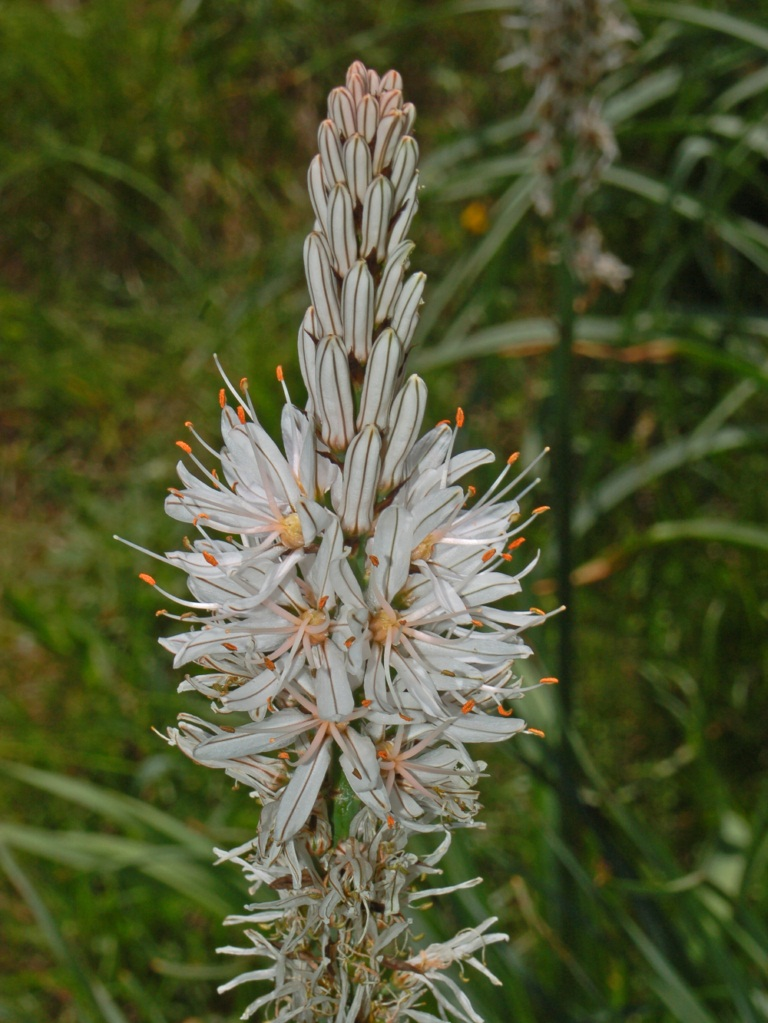
Inflorescence of Asphodelus macrocarpus

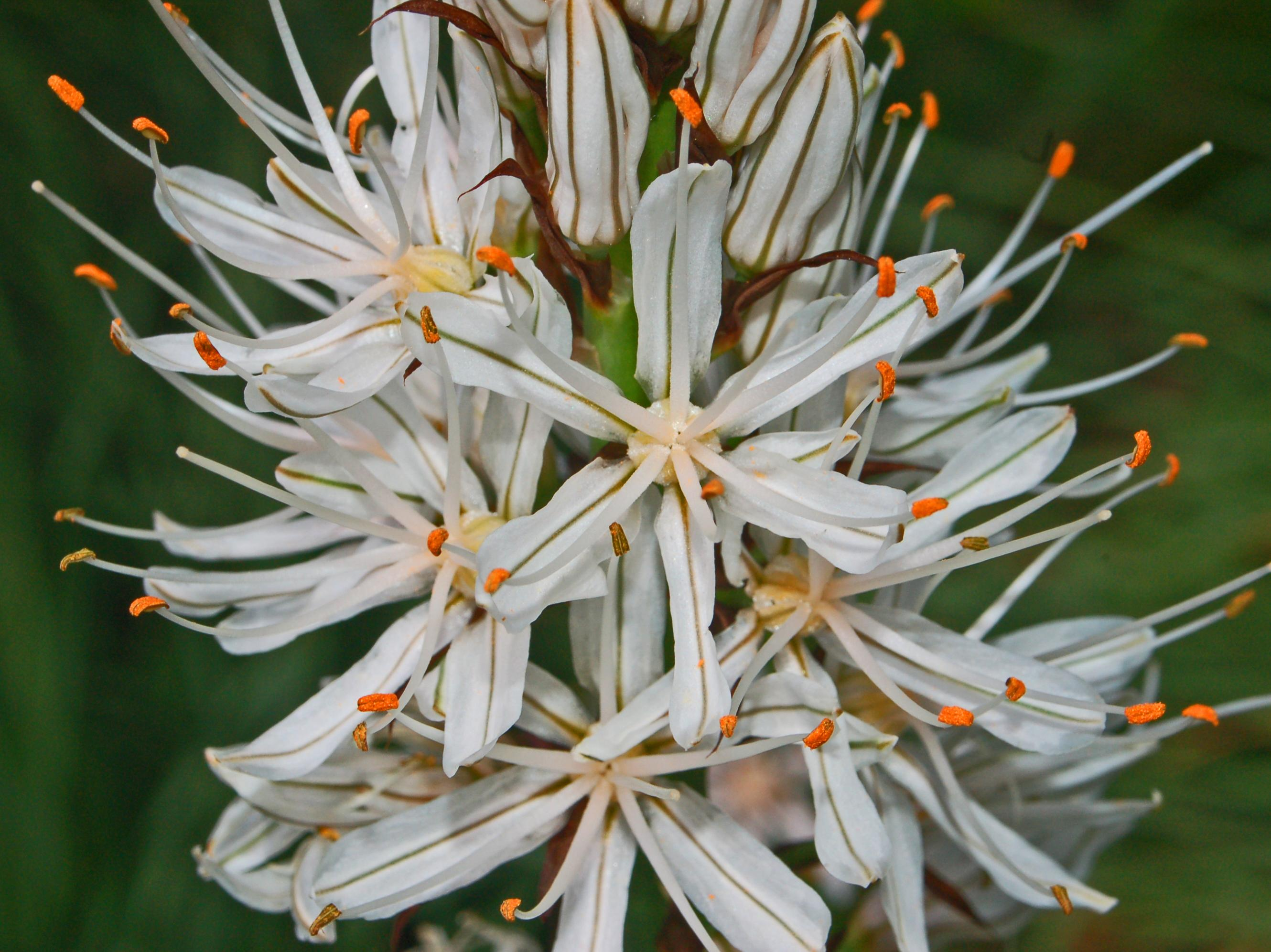
Flowers of Asphodelus macrocarpus

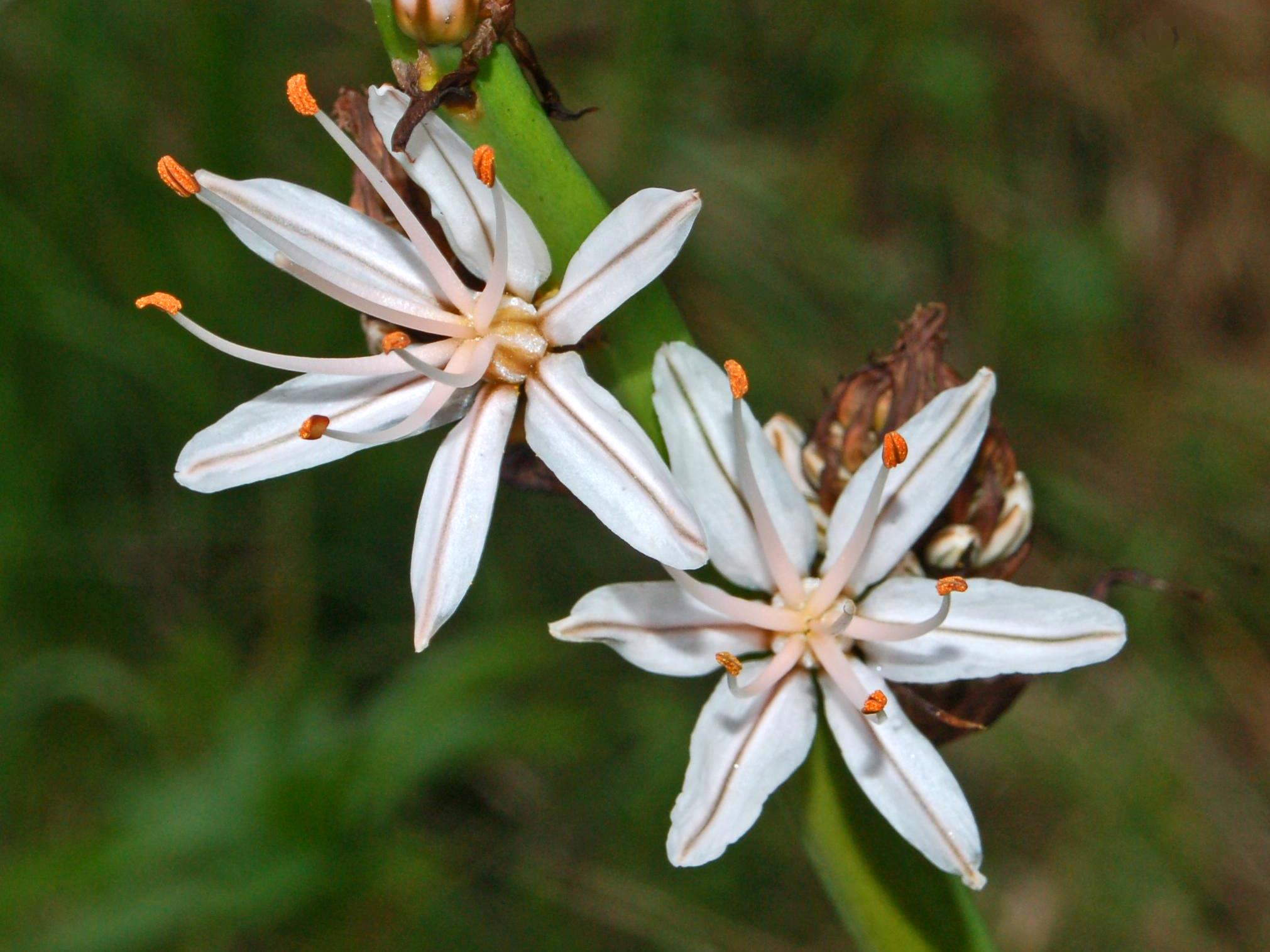
Flower of Asphodelus macrocarpus

== Distribution and habitat ==
This plant is typical of most of the Alps and of the Apennines (Italy). This plant is commonly found in meadows, uncultivated fields and Mediterranean mountain pastures at an altitude of 300–1,800 metres (980–5,910 ft) above sea level.
