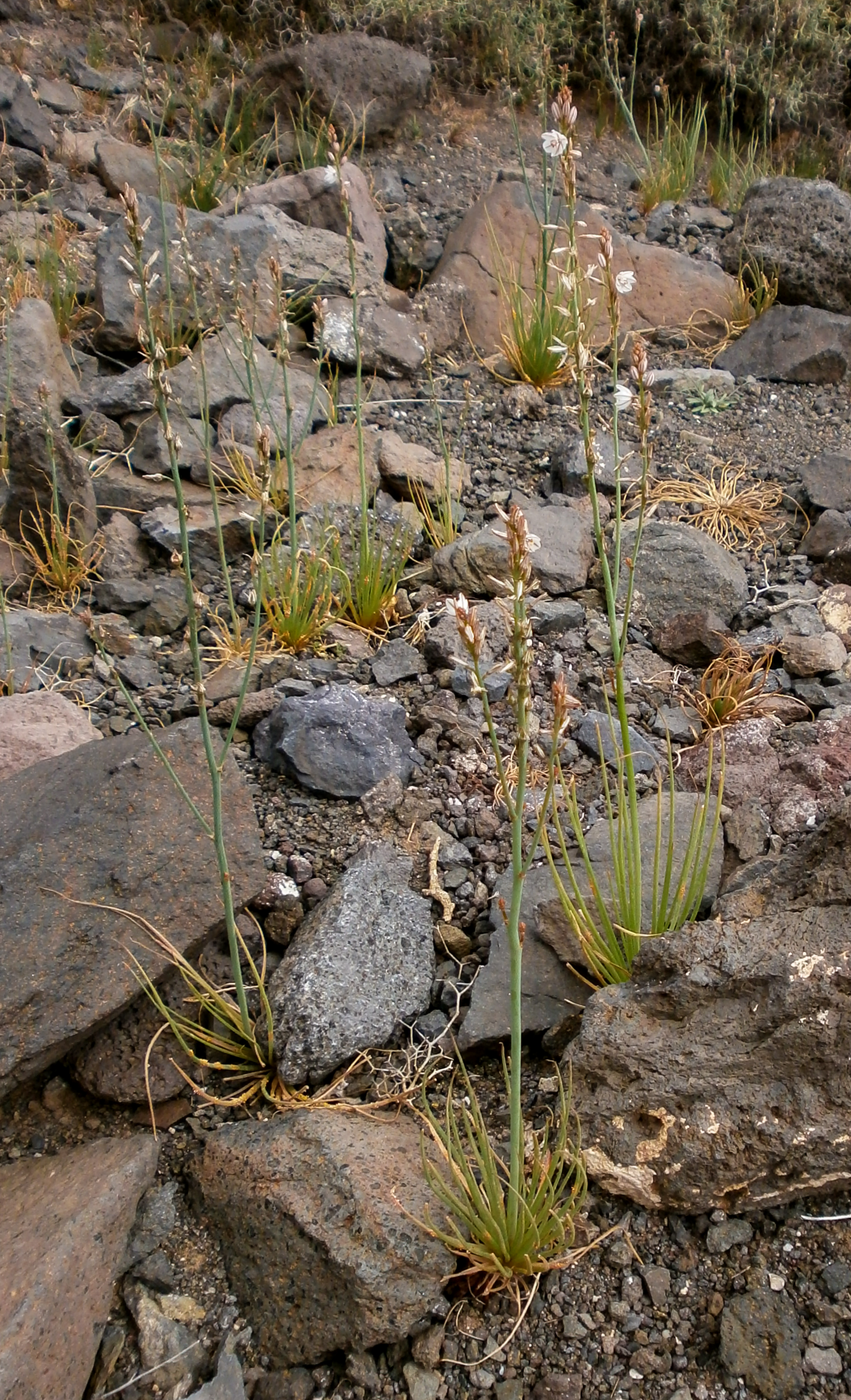

Scientific classification
- Kingdom: Plantae
- Clade: Tracheophytes
- Clade: Angiosperms
- Clade: Monocots
- Order: Asparagales
- Family: Asphodelaceae
- Subfamily: Asphodeloideae
- Genus: Asphodelus
- Species: A. tenuifolius

Binomial name
- Asphodelus tenuifolius Cav.

= Asphodelus tenuifolius =

Species of flowering plant

Asphodelus tenuifolius is a species of plant in the asphodel family Asphodelaceae. It is native to North Africa, Southern Europe, the Middle East and South Asia. It has been introduced to Australia and the Mascarene Islands. It is generally present from the Canary Islands, across the Mediterranean to the Middle East and Afghanistan. It has a fibrous root system.

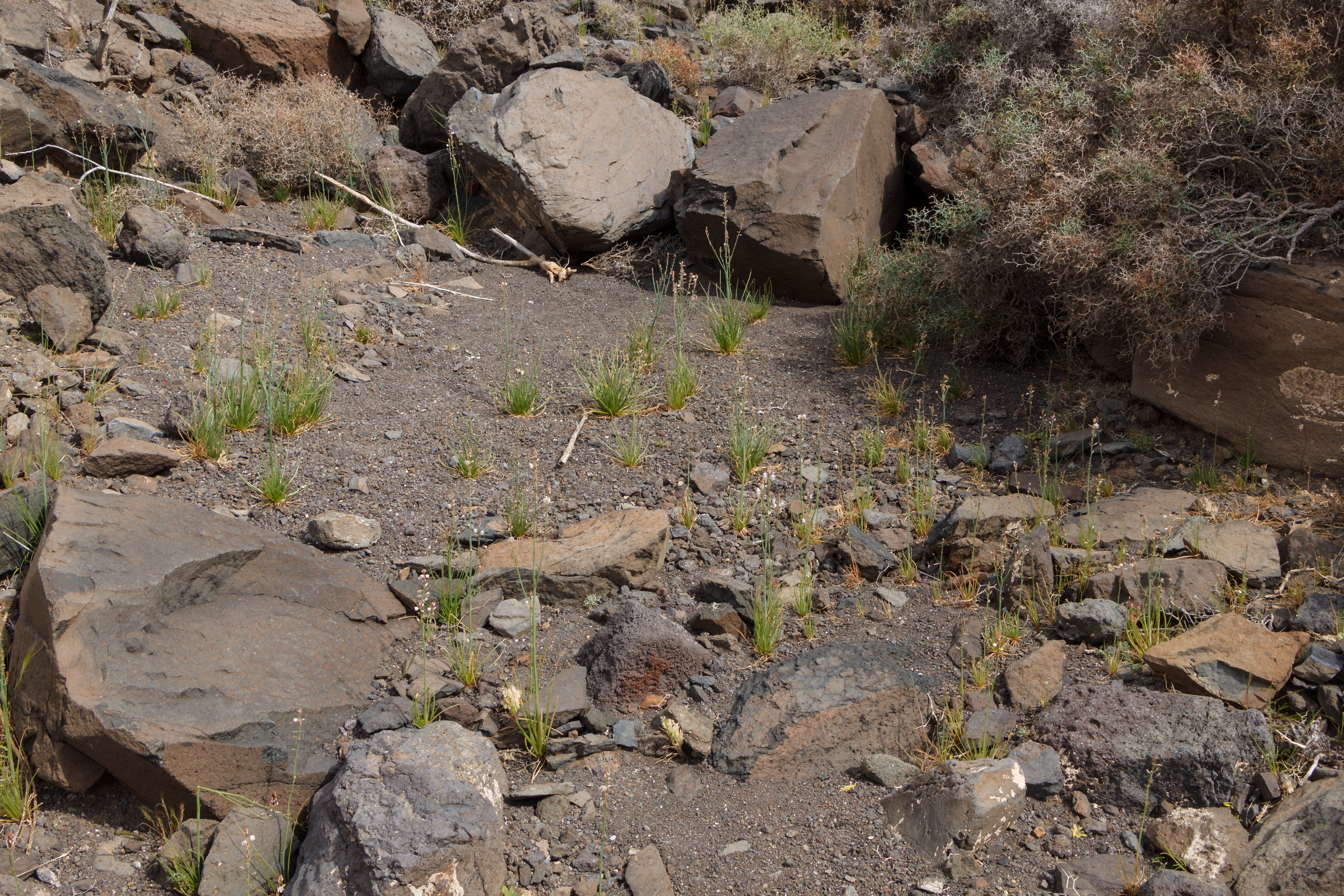
Natural stand

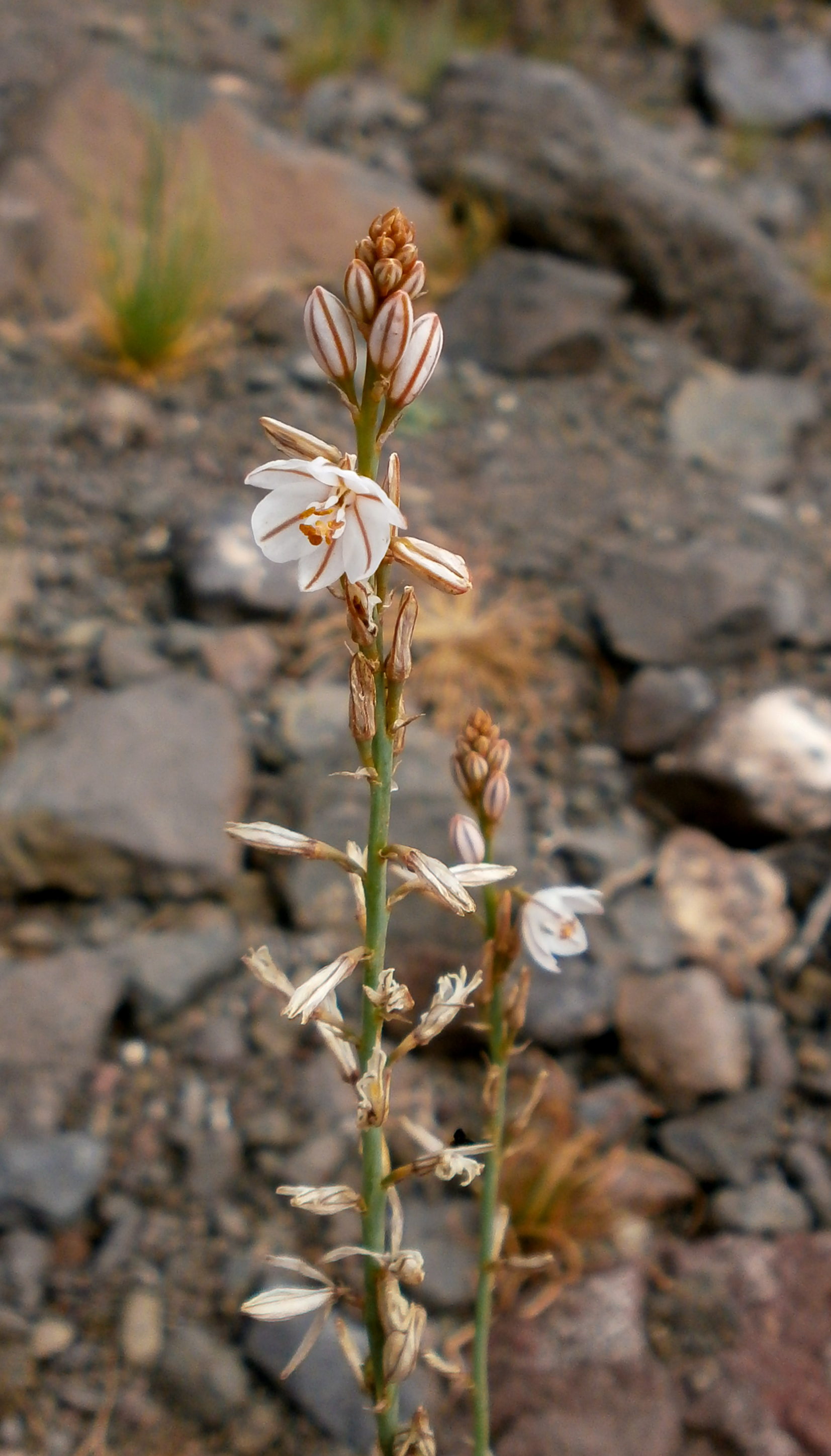
Inflorescence
