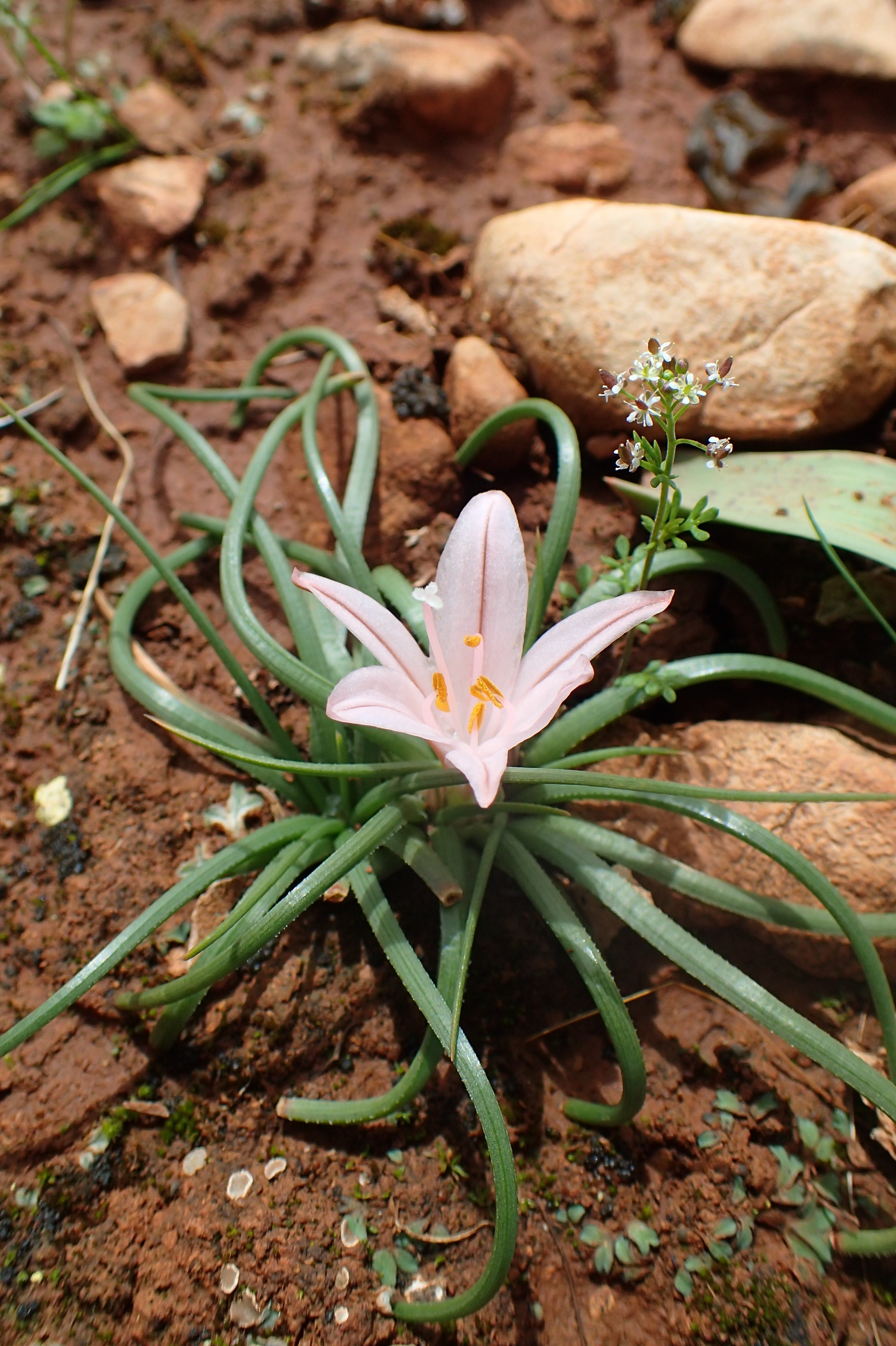
- Asphodelus acaulis

Conservation status
- Least Concern (IUCN 3.1)

Scientific classification
- Kingdom: Plantae
- Clade: Tracheophytes
- Clade: Angiosperms
- Clade: Monocots
- Order: Asparagales
- Family: Asphodelaceae
- Subfamily: Asphodeloideae
- Genus: Asphodelus
- Species: A. acaulis

Binomial name
- Asphodelus acaulis Desf.

= Asphodelus acaulis =

Species of plant

Asphodelus acaulis is a species of asphodel found in North Africa.
