= Asphodelus roseus =

Scientific classification
- Kingdom: Plantae
- Clade: Tracheophytes
- Clade: Angiosperms
- Clade: Monocots
- Order: Asparagales
- Family: Asphodelaceae
- Subfamily: Asphodeloideae
- Genus: Asphodelus
- Species: A. roseus

Binomial name
- Asphodelus roseus Humbert & Maire

Species of plant

Asphodelus roseus is a species of asphodel found in Spain and Morocco.
