= Asphodelus serotinus =

Scientific classification
- Kingdom: Plantae
- Clade: Tracheophytes
- Clade: Angiosperms
- Clade: Monocots
- Order: Asparagales
- Family: Asphodelaceae
- Subfamily: Asphodeloideae
- Genus: Asphodelus
- Species: A. serotinus

Binomial name
- Asphodelus serotinus Wolley-Dod

Species of plant

Asphodelus serotinus is a species of asphodel, endemic to the Iberian Peninsula.
