= Asphodelus ayardii =

Scientific classification
- Kingdom: Plantae
- Clade: Tracheophytes
- Clade: Angiosperms
- Clade: Monocots
- Order: Asparagales
- Family: Asphodelaceae
- Subfamily: Asphodeloideae
- Genus: Asphodelus
- Species: A. ayardii

Binomial name
- Asphodelus ayardii Jahand. & Maire

Species of plant

Asphodelus ayardii is a species of asphodel found in North Africa and the Middle East.
