= Asphodelus bakeri =

Scientific classification
- Kingdom: Plantae
- Clade: Tracheophytes
- Clade: Angiosperms
- Clade: Monocots
- Order: Asparagales
- Family: Asphodelaceae
- Subfamily: Asphodeloideae
- Genus: Asphodelus
- Species: A. bakeri

Binomial name
- Asphodelus bakeri Breistr.

Species of plant

Asphodelus bakeri is a species of asphodel from the western Himalaya.
