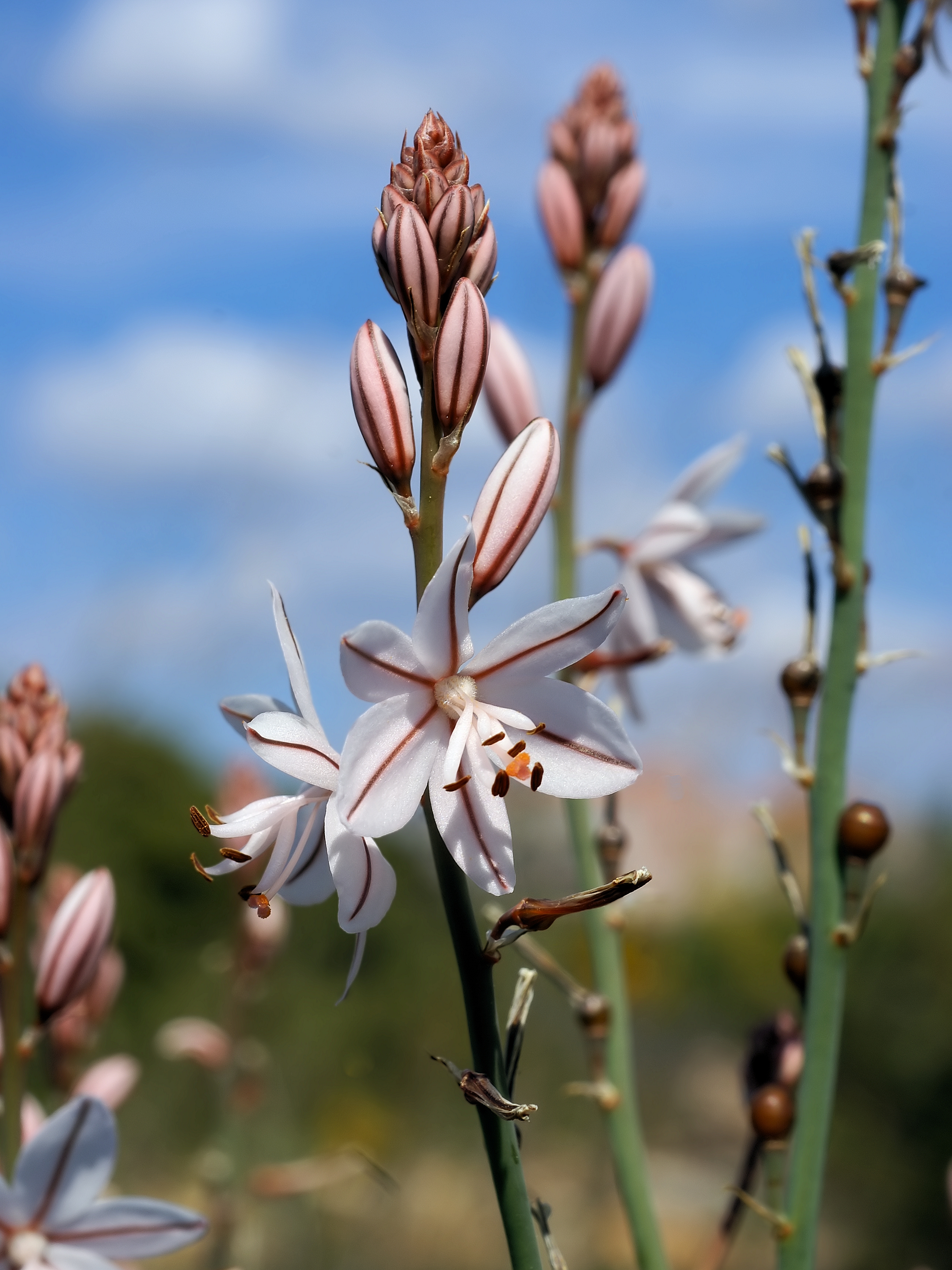

Conservation status
- Least Concern (IUCN 3.1)

Scientific classification
- Kingdom: Plantae
- Clade: Tracheophytes
- Clade: Angiosperms
- Clade: Monocots
- Order: Asparagales
- Family: Asphodelaceae
- Subfamily: Asphodeloideae
- Genus: Asphodelus
- Species: A. fistulosus

Binomial name
- Asphodelus fistulosus L.

= Asphodelus fistulosus =

Species of flowering plant

Asphodelus fistulosus is a species of plant known as hollow-stemmed asphodel, onionweed, onion-leafed asphodel, and pink asphodel. It is native to the Mediterranean region as well as the Arabian Peninsula, Transcaucasus, and Madeira.

It is an invasive exotic weed in the United States, with significant infestations in California, Arizona, New Mexico, and Texas. It is listed as a Federal Noxious Weed by the United States Department of Agriculture. It is also a common weed in parts of Australia, New Zealand, and Mexico, and it thrives in any area with a Mediterranean climate.

It is an annual or short-lived perennial herb growing a hollow stem up to 70 cm (28 in) tall. The root system has a series of tuber-like parts at the base of the stem. The plant takes the form of a large tuft of onion-like rounded hollow leaves up to 30 cm (12 in) long. The inflorescence is a panicle with widely spaced flowers. Each flower is 5–12 mm (0.2–0.5 in) wide with six tepals which are generally white or very pale pink with a neat central longitudinal stripe of brown to reddish-purple. The flowers are diurnal, closing at night and in overcast or low-light weather conditions. The fruit is a rounded capsule containing six seeds.

Two subspecies are accepted.

- Asphodelus fistulosus subsp. fistulosus – Mediterranean basin, Arabian Peninsula, and Transcaucasus
- Asphodelus fistulosus subsp. madeirensis Simon – Madeira
