= Asphodelus bento-rainhae =

Scientific classification
- Kingdom: Plantae
- Clade: Tracheophytes
- Clade: Angiosperms
- Clade: Monocots
- Order: Asparagales
- Family: Asphodelaceae
- Subfamily: Asphodeloideae
- Genus: Asphodelus
- Species: A. bento-rainhae

Binomial name
- Asphodelus bento-rainhae P.Silva

Species of plant

Asphodelus bento-rainhae is a species of asphodel, endemic to the Iberian Peninsula.

== Taxonomy ==
Two subspecies are recognised:

- Asphodelus bento-rainhae subsp. bento-rainhae, endemic to the Gardunha range, Portugal.
- Asphodelus bento-rainhae subsp. salmanticus Z.Díaz & Valdés, from western central Spain.
