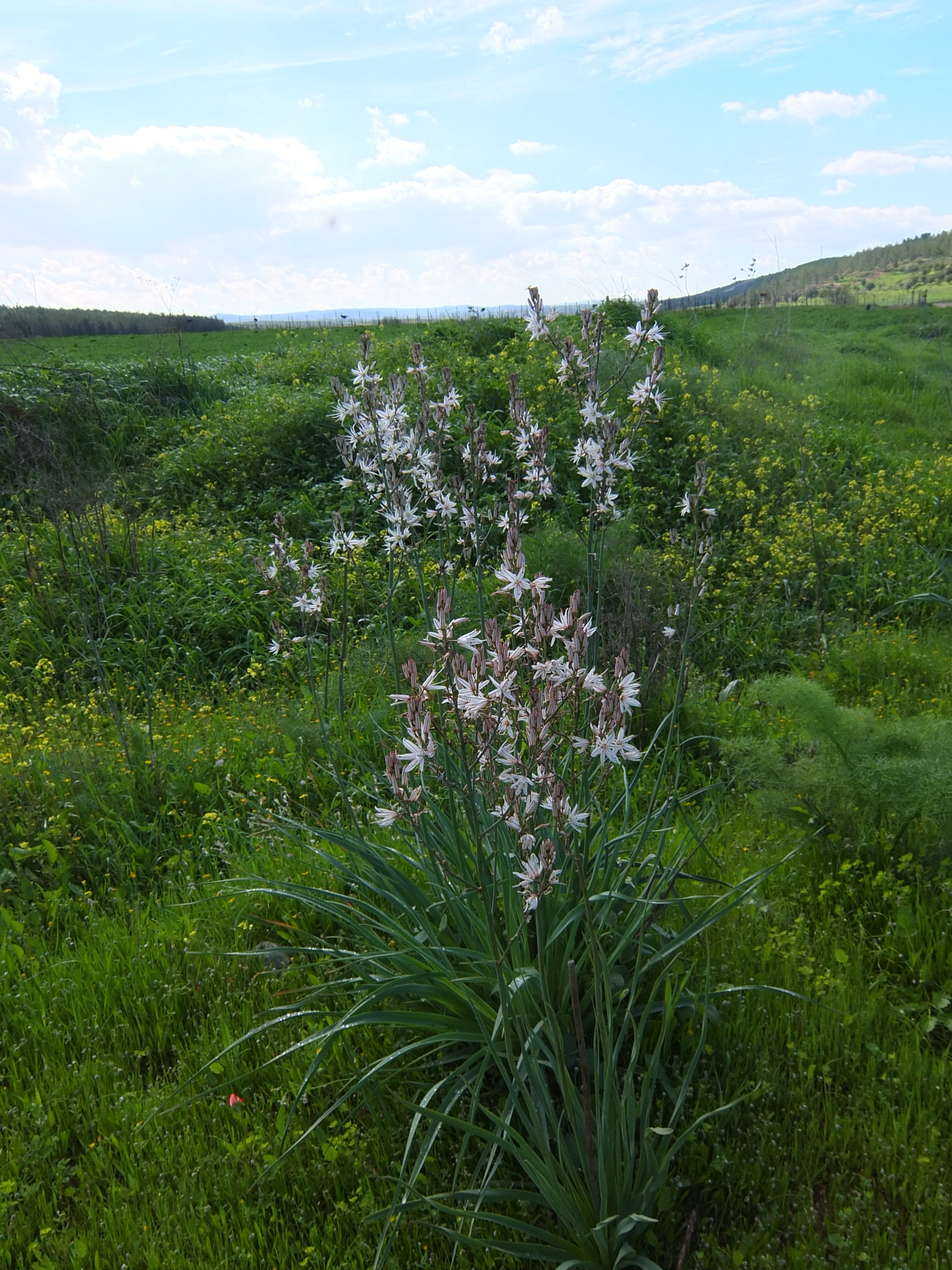
- Summer asphodel (Asphodelus aestivus)

Scientific classification
- Kingdom: Plantae
- Clade: Embryophytes
- Clade: Tracheophytes
- Clade: Angiosperms
- Clade: Monocots
- Order: Asparagales
- Family: Asphodelaceae
- Subfamily: Asphodeloideae
- Genus: Asphodelus; L.

Synonyms
- Asphodeloides Moench; Clausonia Pomel; Verinea Pomel; Gethosyne Salisb.; Ophioprason Salisb.; Glyphosperma S.Watson

= Asphodelus =

Genus of flowering plants

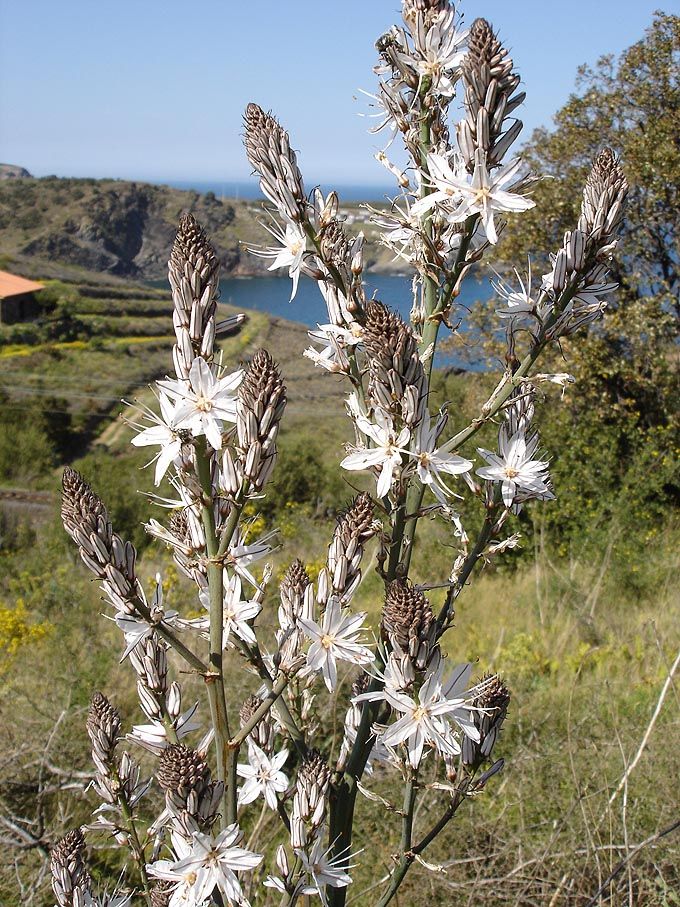
Asphodelus ramosus

Asphodelus is a genus of mainly perennial flowering plants in the asphodel family Asphodelaceae that was first described by Carl Linnaeus in 1753. The genus was formerly included in the lily family (Liliaceae). The genus is native to temperate Europe (mostly the south of Europe), the Mediterranean, Africa, the Middle East, and the Indian subcontinent, and some species have been introduced to, and are now naturalized in, other places such as New Zealand, Australia, Mexico and southwestern United States. Many asphodels are popular garden plants, which grow in well-drained soils with abundant natural light.

== Character ==
The plants are hardy herbaceous perennials with narrow tufted radical leaves and an elongated stem bearing a handsome spike of white or yellow flowers. Asphodelus albus and A. fistulosus have white flowers and grow from 45 to 60 centimetres (1 1/2–2 ft) high; A. ramosus is a larger plant, the large white flowers of which have a reddish-brown line in the middle of each segment.

== Etymology ==
The genus name is derived from the Greek ἀσφόδελος asphodelos.

== Species ==
There are 16 species in the genus.

Species

- Asphodelus acaulis Desf. – Branched asphodel – Algeria, Morocco, Tunisia
- Asphodelus aestivus Brot. – Summer asphodel, also known as Common asphodel and Silver rod – Western Mediterranean (mainly Portugal and Spain)
- Asphodelus albus Mill. – White asphodel, also known as Rimmed lichen – Mediterranean
- Asphodelus ayardii Jahand. & Maire – France, Spain, Italy, Algeria, Morocco, Tunisia, Canary Islands
- Asphodelus bakeri Breistr. – Western Himalayas of northern India, northern Pakistan, etc.
- Asphodelus bento-rainhae P.Silva – Spain, Portugal
- Asphodelus cerasiferus J.Gay – France, Spain, Sardinia, Algeria, Morocco, Tunisia
- Asphodelus fistulosus L. – Onion-leaved asphodel, also known as Onionweed – Mediterranean (naturalized in New Zealand, Mexico, southwestern United States, etc.)
- Asphodelus gracilis Braun-Blanq. & Maire – Morocco
- Asphodelus lusitanicus Cout. – Spain, Portugal
- Asphodelus macrocarpus Parl. – Mediterranean
- Asphodelus ramosus L. – Branched asphodel – southern Europe, northern Africa, the Middle East and Canary Islands
- Asphodelus refractus Boiss. – North Africa and Arabian Peninsula from Mauritania & Morocco to Saudi Arabia
- Asphodelus roseus Humbert & Maire – Spain, Morocco
- Asphodelus serotinus Wolley-Dod – Spain, Portugal
- Asphodelus tenuifolius Cav. – Southeast Europe and northern Africa from the Mediterranean south to Mali, Chad, Sudan, Somalia; south-central Asia from Caucasus to India
- Asphodelus viscidulus Boiss. – North Africa, Middle East, Arabian Peninsula

Formerly included

- Asphodelus luteus L. – synonym of Asphodeline lutea

== Uses ==
The leaves are used to wrap burrata, an Italian cheese. The leaves and the cheese last about the same time, three or four days, and thus fresh leaves are a sign of a fresh cheese, while dried out leaves indicate that the cheese is past its prime.

== Mythology ==
In Greek legend the asphodel is one of the most famous of the plants connected with the dead and the underworld. Homer describes it as covering the great meadow (ἀσφόδελος λειμών), the haunt of the dead. It was planted on graves, and is often connected with Persephone, who appears crowned with a garland of asphodels. Its general connection with death is due no doubt to the greyish colour of its leaves and its yellowish flowers, which suggest the gloom of the underworld and the pallor of death. The roots were eaten by the poorer Greeks; hence such food was thought good enough for the shades. The asphodel was also supposed to be a remedy for venomous snake-bites and a specific against sorcery; it was fatal to mice, but preserved pigs from disease. The Libyan nomads made their huts of asphodel stalks.

== Poetry ==
The asphodel is mentioned by several poets in connection with the mythology of death, and by association, the afterlife - specifically the Isles of the Blessed and Elysium - part of the ancient Greek concept of the afterlife.

- Conrad Aiken: "Snowflake on asphodel—how clear, how bright / Snow's death on dying flower, yet both immortal"
- Elizabeth Barrett Browning: "As one who stands in dewless asphodel, Looks backward on the tedious time he had In the upper life."
- Florence Earle Coates: "beauty wove a magic spell/ For him, and early, at his need,/ Upon a bed of asphodel/ He found a tuneful reed" in poem "Henry Wadsworth Longfellow"
- Leonard Cohen: "But in his lapel, discreetly, he wore a sprig of asphodel."
- William Faulkner: "There asphodels are scattered through the night, Like ghosts of young beseeching hands." ONE WHO WAS LEFT LIVING, CHANSONS AU PRINTEMPS, handwritten with drawings, 1919, W. Faulkner, RFC
- Robert Frost: “And where they sought without the sword/ Wide fields of asphodel fore’er” The Trial by Existence, A Boy’s Will
- Allen Ginsberg: "An Asphodel"
- Hesiod: "Children! They know not how much more the half is than the whole, nor how great is the profit in mallow and asphodel."
- Homer: "So I said and off he went, the ghost of the great runner, Aeacus’ grandson loping with long strides across the fields of asphodel, triumphant in all I had told him of his son, his gallant, glorious son."
- Henry Wadsworth Longfellow: "He, who wore the crown of asphodels, Descending, at my door began to knock."
- John Milton: "To embathe In nectared lavers strewed with asphodel."
- Edgar Allan Poe: "and when, one by one, the white daisies shrank away, there sprang up in place of them, ten by ten of the ruby-red asphodel"
- Alexander Pope: "Happy Souls who dwell In Yellow Meads of Asphodel, Or Amaranthine Bowers."
- Ezra Pound, "Canto XXI": "Danced there Athame, danced, and there Phaethusa/ With colour in the vein,/ Strong as with blood drink, once,/ With colour in the vein/ Red in the smoke-faint throat. Dis caught her up./ And the old man went on there/ beating his mule with an asphodel."
- Alfred Tennyson: "Others in Elysian valleys dwell, Resting weary limbs at last on beds of asphodel."
- Orville E. Watson: "see a river like Kokosing, in meadows sweet with asphodel"
- William Carlos Williams: "Asphodel, that greeny flower"
- Marie Laforêt: Song "Mes bouquets d'asphodèles", lyricist Yvon London (1969)
- Oscar Wilde: "The heavy fields of scentless Asphodel, the loveless lips with which men kiss in hell"; "they sleep, they sleep, beneath the rocking trees where asphodel and yellow lotus twine"
- Dani Filth: "When the Sun goes out our powers/ Will extend throughout Heaven like Asphodel"
- Virginia Woolf: " But some were early infected by a germ said to be bred of the pollen of the asphodel" (describing the love of literature in Orlando)
