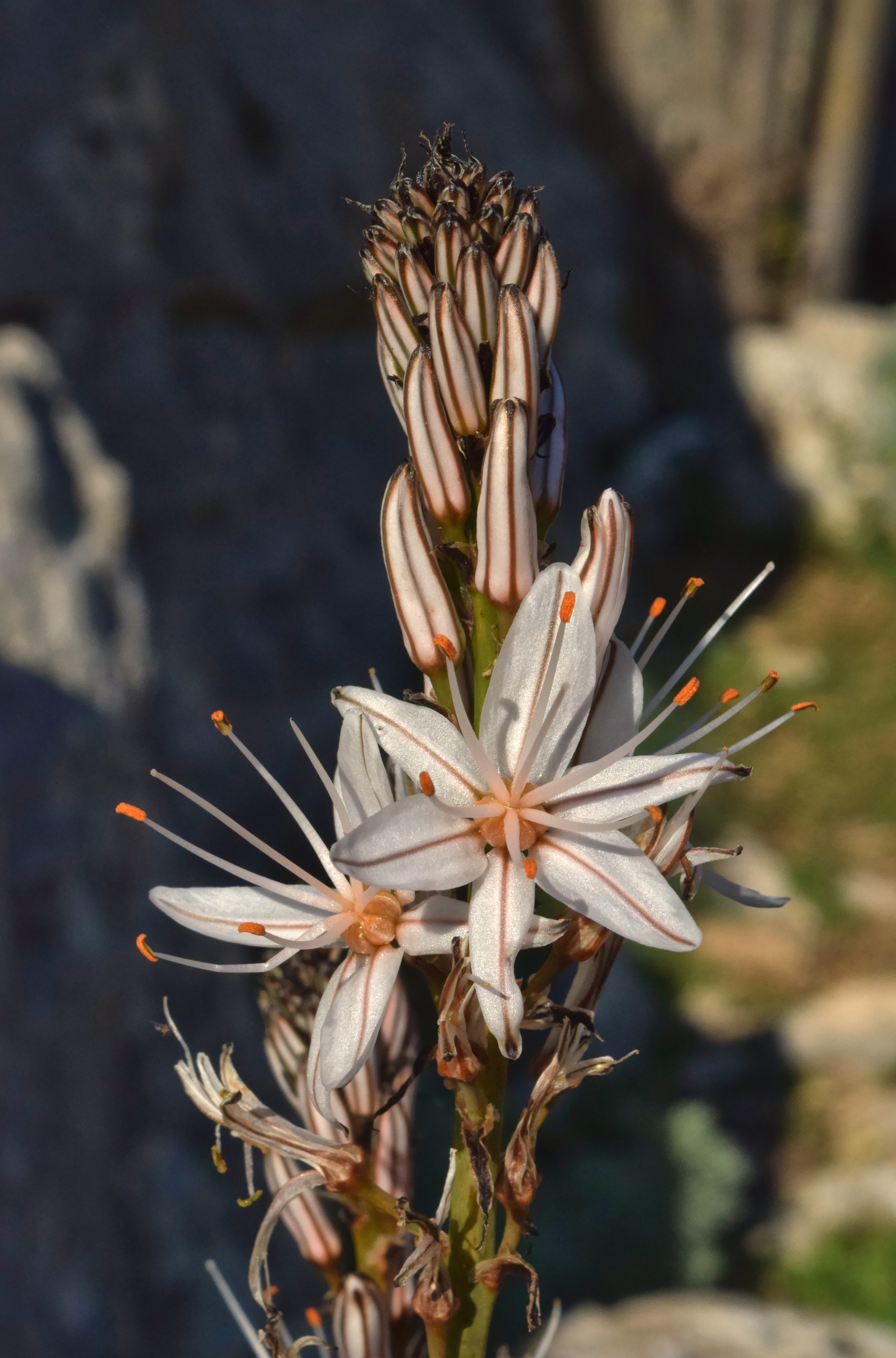
- Blooming in Sicily.

Scientific classification
- Kingdom: Plantae
- Clade: Embryophytes
- Clade: Tracheophytes
- Clade: Spermatophytes
- Clade: Angiosperms
- Clade: Monocots
- Order: Asparagales
- Family: Asphodelaceae
- Subfamily: Asphodeloideae
- Genus: Asphodelus
- Species: A. ramosus

Binomial name
- Asphodelus ramosus L.

Synonyms
- Asphodelus microcarpus Viv.

= Asphodelus ramosus =

Species of flowering plant

Asphodelus ramosus, the branched asphodel, is a perennial herbaceous plant in the order Asparagales. Similar in appearance to Asphodelus albus and particularly Asphodelus cerasiferus and Asphodelus aestivus, it may be distinguished by its highly branched stem and smaller fruits. There has been much confusion over the nomenclature and taxonomy of the species, owing to its similarity to Asphodelus aestivus.

Asphodelus ramosus is native to the Mediterranean region of southern Europe, northern Africa, and the Middle East. It can also be found in the Canary Islands. It is particularly common in coastal areas of the Mediterranean with intensive grazing and occasional fire. In some areas it shows an affinity for acidic soils, mainly schist. It can form abundant colonies, usually flowering in February to May. It has been thought to be Homer's asphodel of the underworld, but so has the closely related Asphodeline lutea. The branched asphodel is known to contain colchicine, a chemical used in the treatment of gout.

== Physical characteristics ==
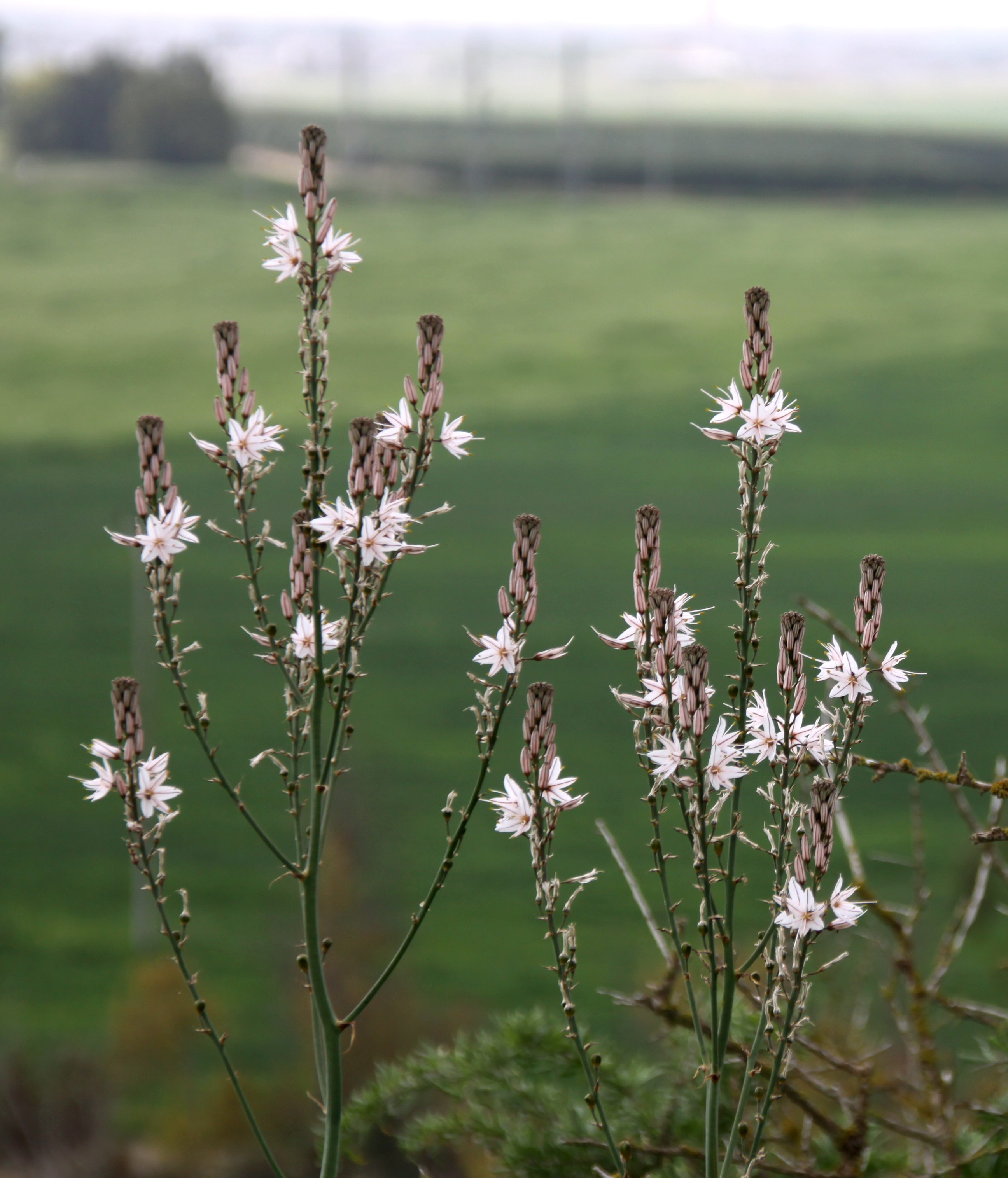
Branched asphodel in the Negev, Israel

Asphodelus ramosus is a geophyte, having an underground storage organ which enables the plant to survive adverse conditions, such as excessive heat and drought. Its leaves, growing to a height of 60 centimetres (24 in)–80 centimetres (31 in), contain alkaloids that are harmful to sheep and goats in the wet, winter months, but during the summer when their leaves dry out, they lose their toxicity. Its very numerous flowers are white with six tepals bearing a central brown streak. The fruits are small round capsules.

== Uses ==
Some traditional folk usages of the plant have been to make a glue from the plant's root. A remedy against warts is also derived from its root. According to Dioscorides, a concoction made from its roots (mixed with wine) induces vomiting. Formerly, the entire plant was used in treating venomous snake bites (its efficacy yet to be proven scientifically).
