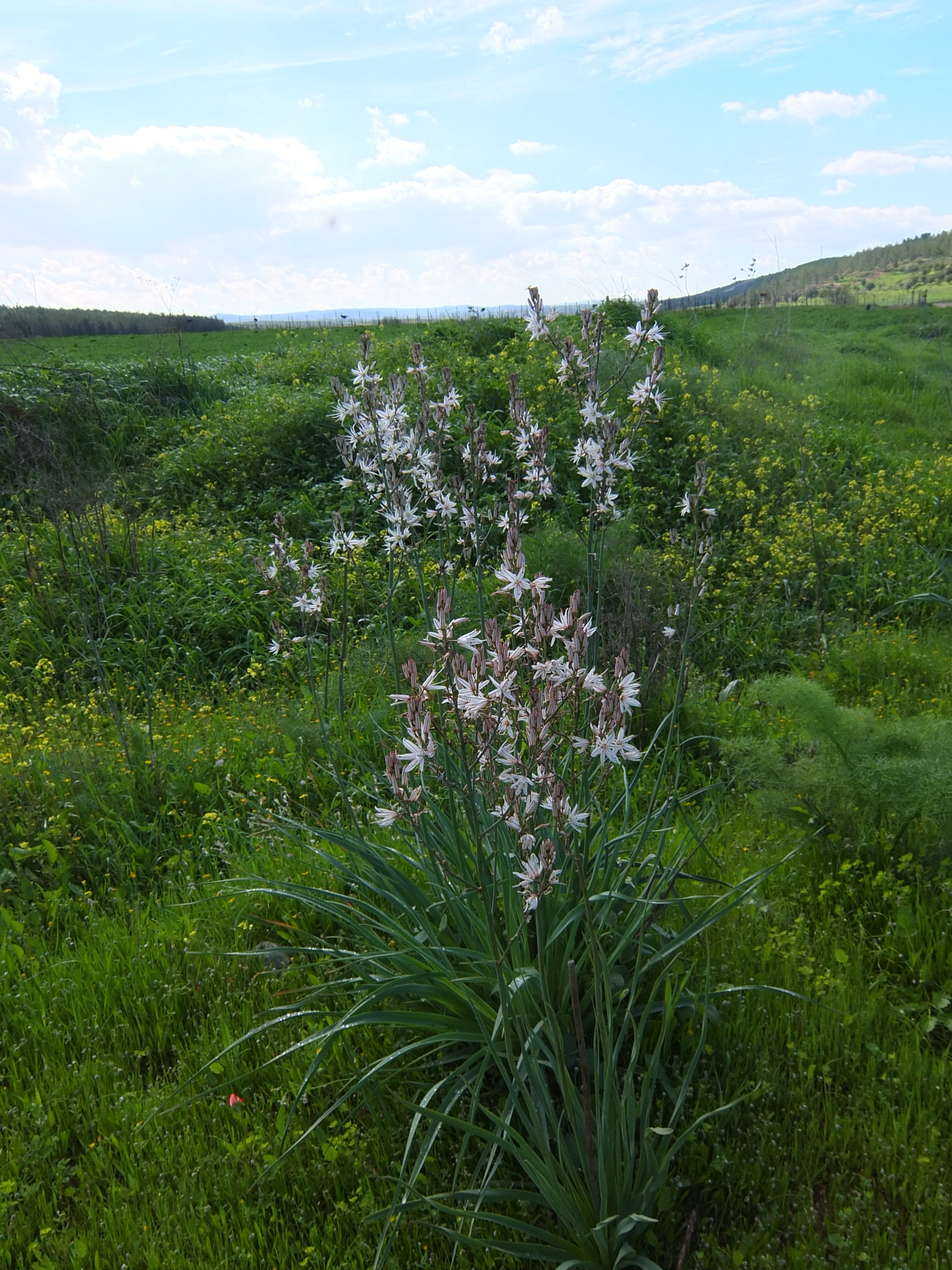

Conservation status
- Least Concern (IUCN 3.1)

Scientific classification
- Kingdom: Plantae
- Clade: Tracheophytes
- Clade: Angiosperms
- Clade: Monocots
- Order: Asparagales
- Family: Asphodelaceae
- Subfamily: Asphodeloideae
- Genus: Asphodelus
- Species: A. aestivus

Binomial name
- Asphodelus aestivus Brot.

= Asphodelus aestivus =

Summer asphodel

Species of plant

Asphodelus aestivus, the summer asphodel, is a species of asphodel, a common Western Mediterranean geophyte with a short vertical rhizome and basal leaves. Its flowers are actinomorphic, pinkish-white, with six perianth segments, 14–19 mm long and six stamens of the same length, in two whorls. Its distribution is limited to the Western Mediterranean, mainly found in Portugal and Spain on the European mainland. There has been a lot of confusion over the nomenclature and taxonomy of the species, owing to its similarity to Asphodelus ramosus. It grows in dry grasslands, phrygana and on rocky or sandy ground.

== Physical characteristics ==
The Asphodelus aestivus is a geophyte, having an underground storage organ which enables the plant to survive adverse conditions, such as excessive heat and drought. Its leaves, growing to a height of 60 centimetres (24 in)–80 centimetres (31 in), contain alkaloids that are harmful to sheep and goats in the wet, winter months, but during the summer when their leaves dry out, they lose their toxicity. In the Iberian Peninsula it flowers from June to September, although in the Algarve (SW Portugal) it may flower in May or at the end of April. There, the leaves are already withered by the time the plants flower.

== Uses ==
Some traditional folk usages of the plant (could refer to several species of Asphodelus) have been to make a glue from the plant's root. Serish is the name for the adhesive made from the root and used in Persian & Iranian papermaking and bookbinding, in particular as a surface size and to laminate paper together for the boards of Persian lacquer bindings. A remedy against warts is also derived from its root. According to Dioscorides, a concoction made from its roots (mixed with wine) induces vomiting. Formerly, the entire plant was used in treating poisonous snake bites (its efficacy yet to be proven scientifically).

== Gallery ==
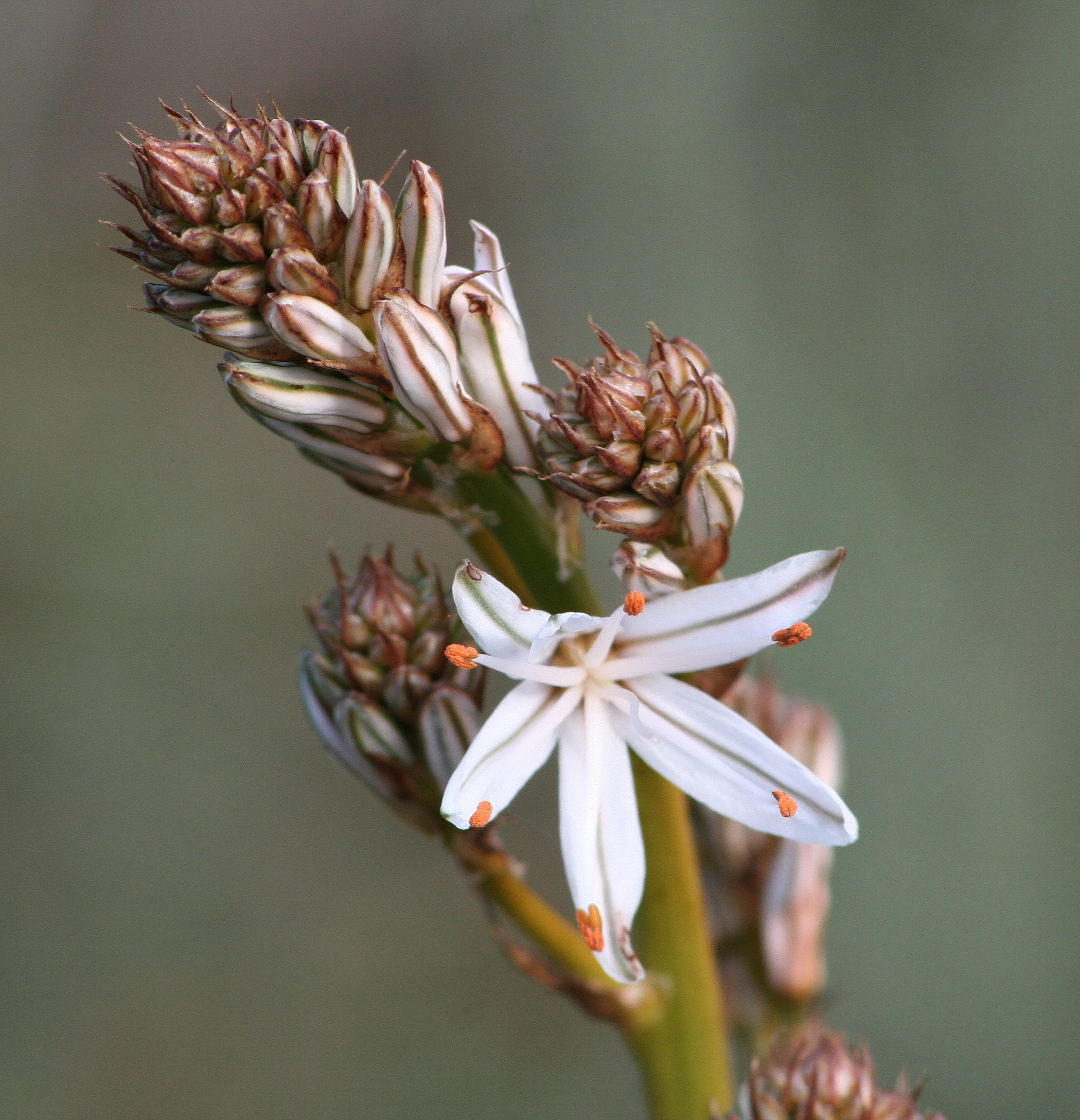
The flower of the Asphodelus aestivus
