= Irith Pomeranz =

Israeli electrical engineer

Irith Pomeranz (Hebrew: אירית פומרנץ) is an Israeli electrical engineer known for her research in circuit testing and fault tolerance. She is a professor of electrical and computer engineering at Purdue University and a Fellow of the IEEE.

As of 2019, her current research includes: Test generation, design for testability, built in self test and diagnosis of integrated circuits.

== Education and career ==
Pomeranz is a 1985 graduate of the Technion – Israel Institute of Technology, and completed her doctorate in 1989 at the Technion. Her dissertation, Fault Detection in Digital Circuits, was supervised by Zvi Kohavi.

After completing her doctorate, she became a lecturer at the Technion, and then in 1990 an assistant professor of electrical and computer engineering at the University of Iowa. She was promoted to full professor in 1998 and moved to Purdue in 2000.

== Recognition ==
In 1999, Pomeranz was elected as a Fellow of the IEEE "for contributions to the area of test generation for digital logic circuits". In 2016, the International Test Conference selected one of her papers, "Preferred Fill: A Scalable Method to Reduce Capture Power for Scan Based Design", as "the most significant paper published ten years before".
