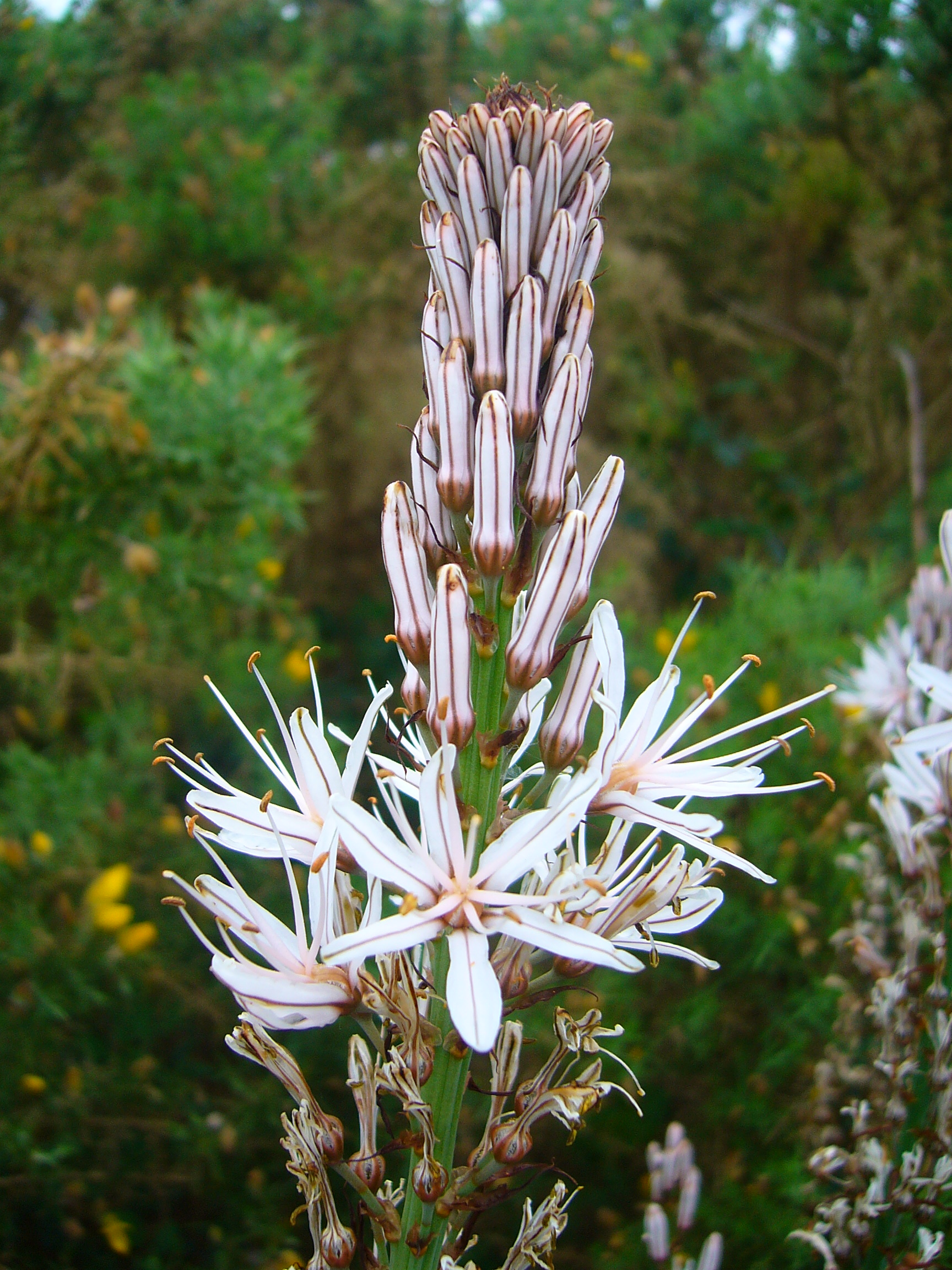

Scientific classification
- Kingdom: Plantae
- Clade: Embryophytes
- Clade: Tracheophytes
- Clade: Angiosperms
- Clade: Monocots
- Order: Asparagales
- Family: Asphodelaceae
- Subfamily: Asphodeloideae
- Genus: Asphodelus
- Species: A. albus

Binomial name
- Asphodelus albus Mill.

Synonyms
- Asphodelus sphaerocarpus Gren. & Godron; Asimina cuneata Shuttlew ex A. Gray; Pityothamnus reticulatus (Shuttlew. ex Chapm.) Small; Asphodelus arrondeaui J.Lloyd; Asphodelus subalpinus Gren. & Godr.

= Asphodelus albus =

Species of plant

Asphodelus albus, common name white asphodel, is a herbaceous perennial plant belonging to the genus Asphodelus.

== Description ==
White asphodel grows to a height of 50–120 centimetres (20–47 in). The plain stem is supported by fleshy, thickened roots (rhizomes). The leaves, which originate from the base of the stem, are gutter-shaped and glaucous (covered by a waxy coating), about 20–22 millimetres (0.79–0.87 in) wide and 50–70 centimetres (20–28 in) long. The white hermaphroditic flowers are funnel-shaped, 4 centimetres (1.6 in) of diameter, with six elongated petals. The flowering period extends from April through June. The egg-shaped yellow-green seed capsules are usually 8–10 millimetres (0.31–0.39 in) in length.

== Subspecies ==
- Asphodelus albus subsp. carpetanus Z. Díaz & Valdés
- Asphodelus albus subsp. delphinensis (Gren. & Godr.) Z. Díaz & Valdés
- Asphodelus albus subsp. occidentalis (Jord.) Z.Díaz & Valdés
- Asphodelus albus subsp. villarsii (Verl. ex Billot) I. Richardson & Smythies

== Distribution and habitat ==
This plant is native to the Mediterranean area. It is commonly found in meadows and heath of northern Portugal, central Spain, southwest France, and along the southern Alps to the western Balkans up to an altitude of 2,000 metres (6,600 ft). It is also found on the African continent, mainly in Libyan territory. Soils with a high lime content are preferred.

== In culture ==
White asphodel is a feature of the Asphodel Meadows. In Ancient Greece, white asphodel was associated with mourning and death. Its presence was held to facilitate the transition of the dead to Elysium.

White asphodel is also known by the name of branched lily or king's spear.

White asphodel roots were used as food staple in ancient Greece: According to Pliny the Elder, one plant could produce up to 80 tubers. Charles de L'ecluse wrote that he saw 200 tubers attached to one plant. Theophrastus mentioned that the roasted stalk and seeds could be used as food as well. Asphodel is supposed to have extended Epimenides's life. The custom of planting graves in Greece with asphodel as described in 1887 Macmillan's Magazine may have been to provide nourishment to the dead.

It was introduced as an ornamental in England in 1551, and as of 1887 "extensively used in Algeria for the manufacture of alcohol".

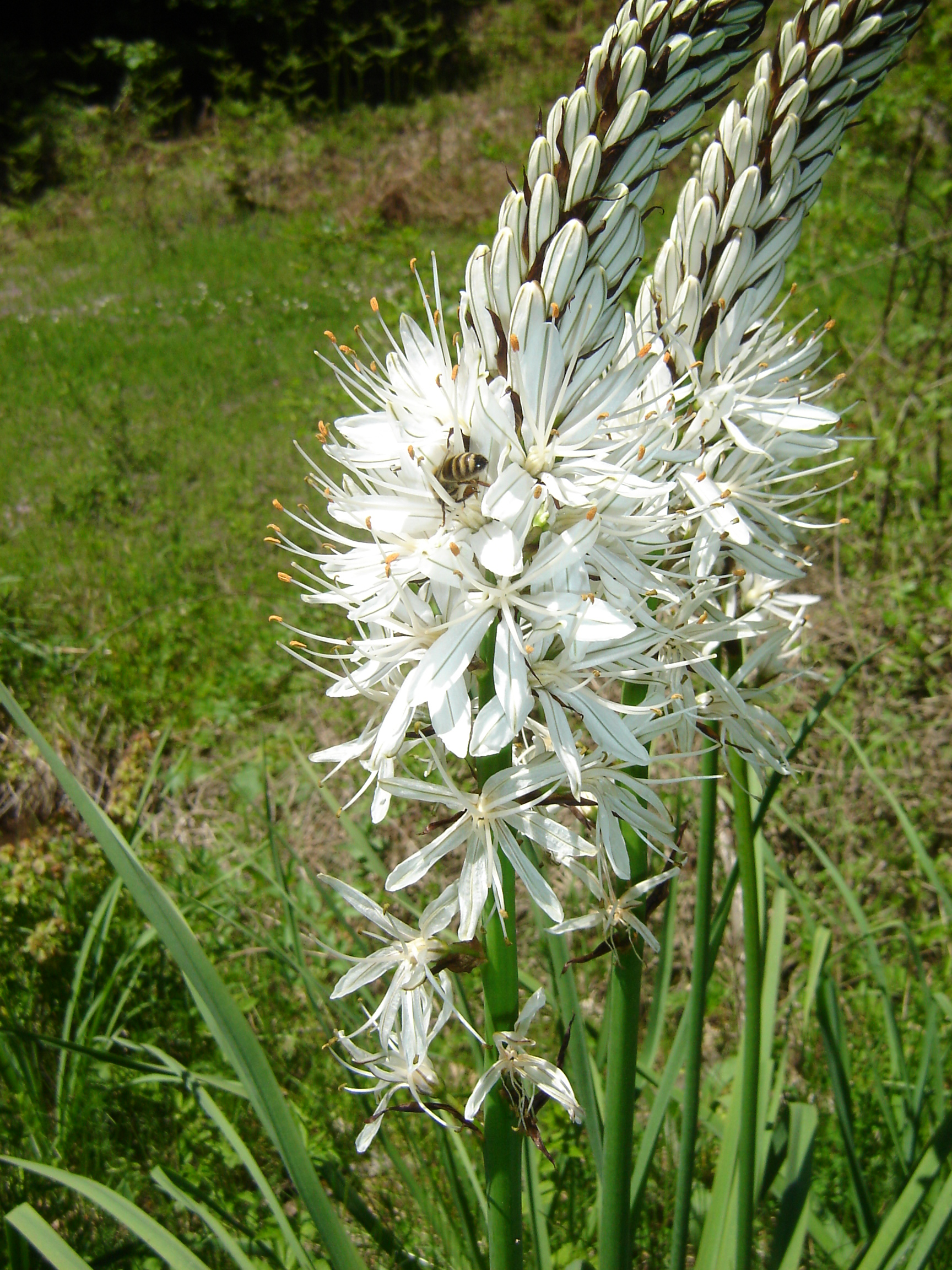
In Mavrovo National Park, North Macedonia

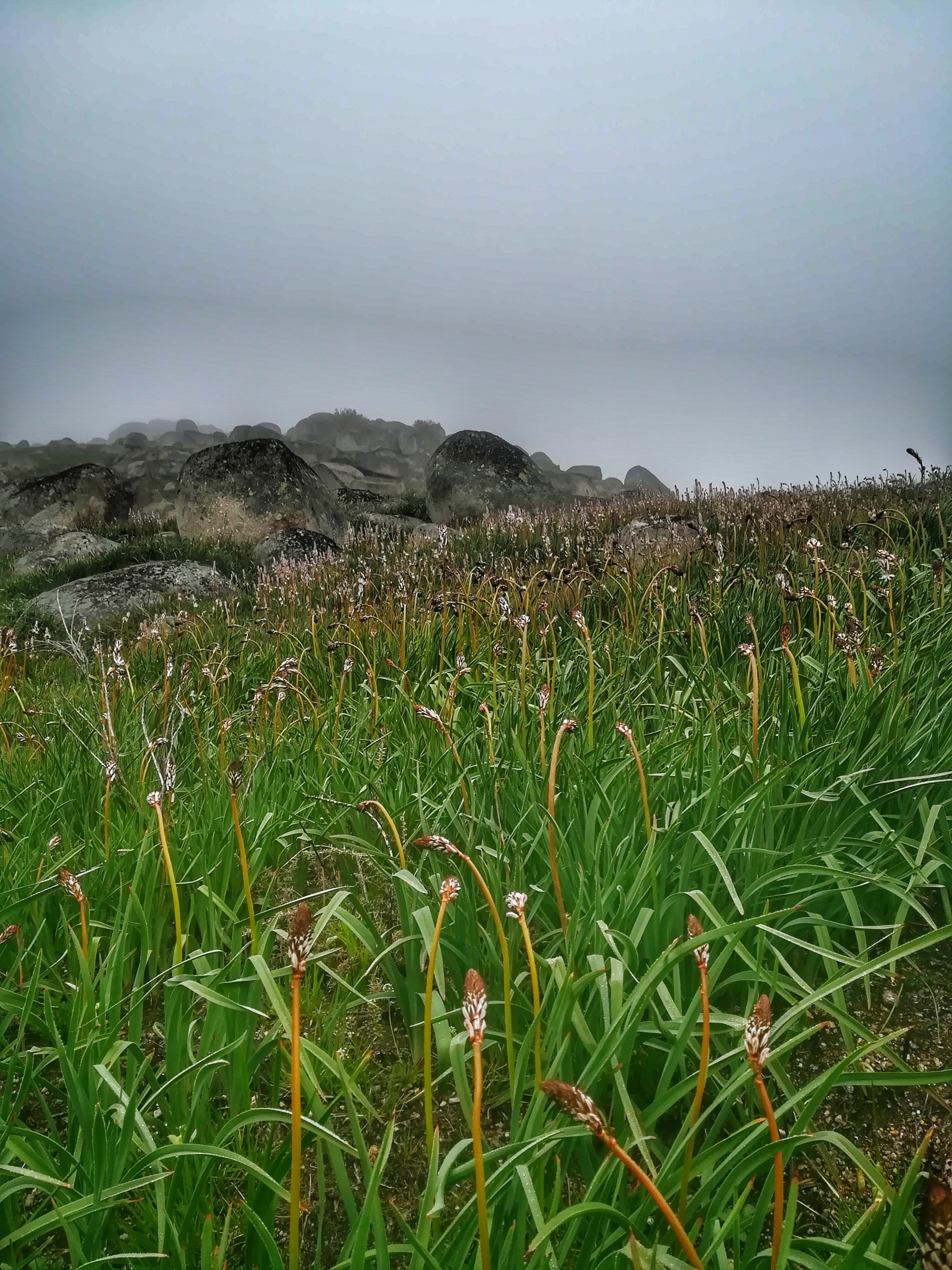
In the mountain range of Montemuro, northern Portugal

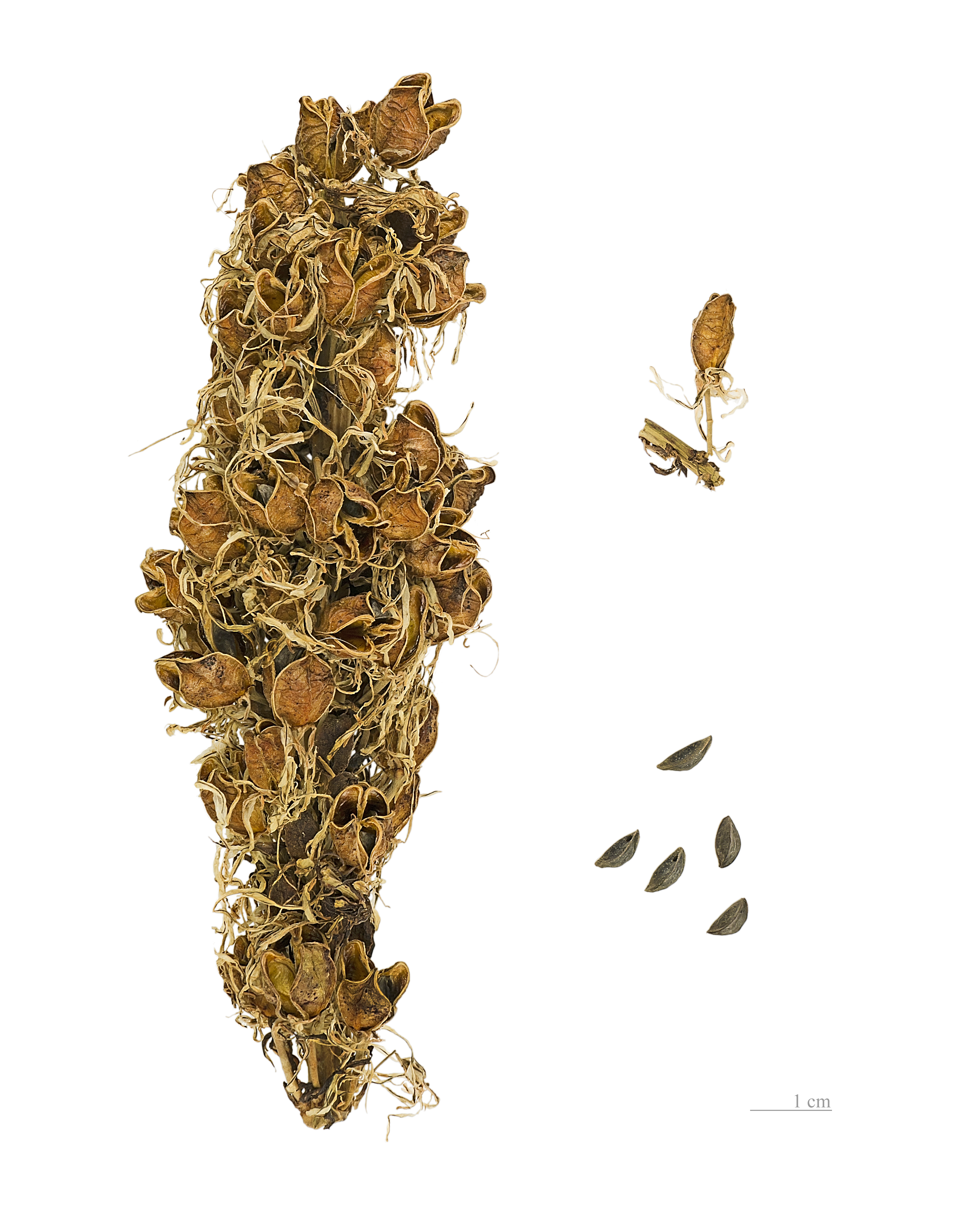
Capsules and seeds
