= Pomerantsev =

Pomerantsev (Russian: Померанцев) (feminine: Pomerantseva) is an artificial Russian clerical surname derived from the fruit, exotic for Russia, bitter orange, pomeranets in Russian. Notable people with the surname include:

- Alexander Pomerantsev (1849—1918), Russian architect
- Boris Ivanovich Pomerantsev (1903-1939), Russian acarologist
- Peter Pomerantsev (born 1977), Soviet-born British journalist, author and TV producer
- Erna Pomerantseva (1899-1908), Russian folklorist

== Fictional characters ==
- Anna Pomerantseva is a character in US TV series Homeland

== See also ==
- Pomeranz
