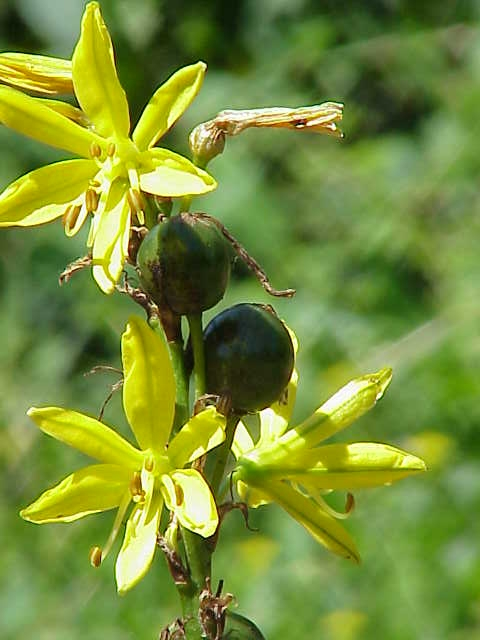

Scientific classification
- Kingdom: Plantae
- Clade: Embryophytes
- Clade: Tracheophytes
- Clade: Spermatophytes
- Clade: Angiosperms
- Clade: Monocots
- Order: Asparagales
- Family: Asphodelaceae
- Subfamily: Asphodeloideae
- Genus: Asphodeline
- Species: A. lutea

Binomial name
- Asphodeline lutea (L.) Rchb.

Synonyms
- Asphodelus luteus L.

= Asphodeline lutea =

Species of flowering plant

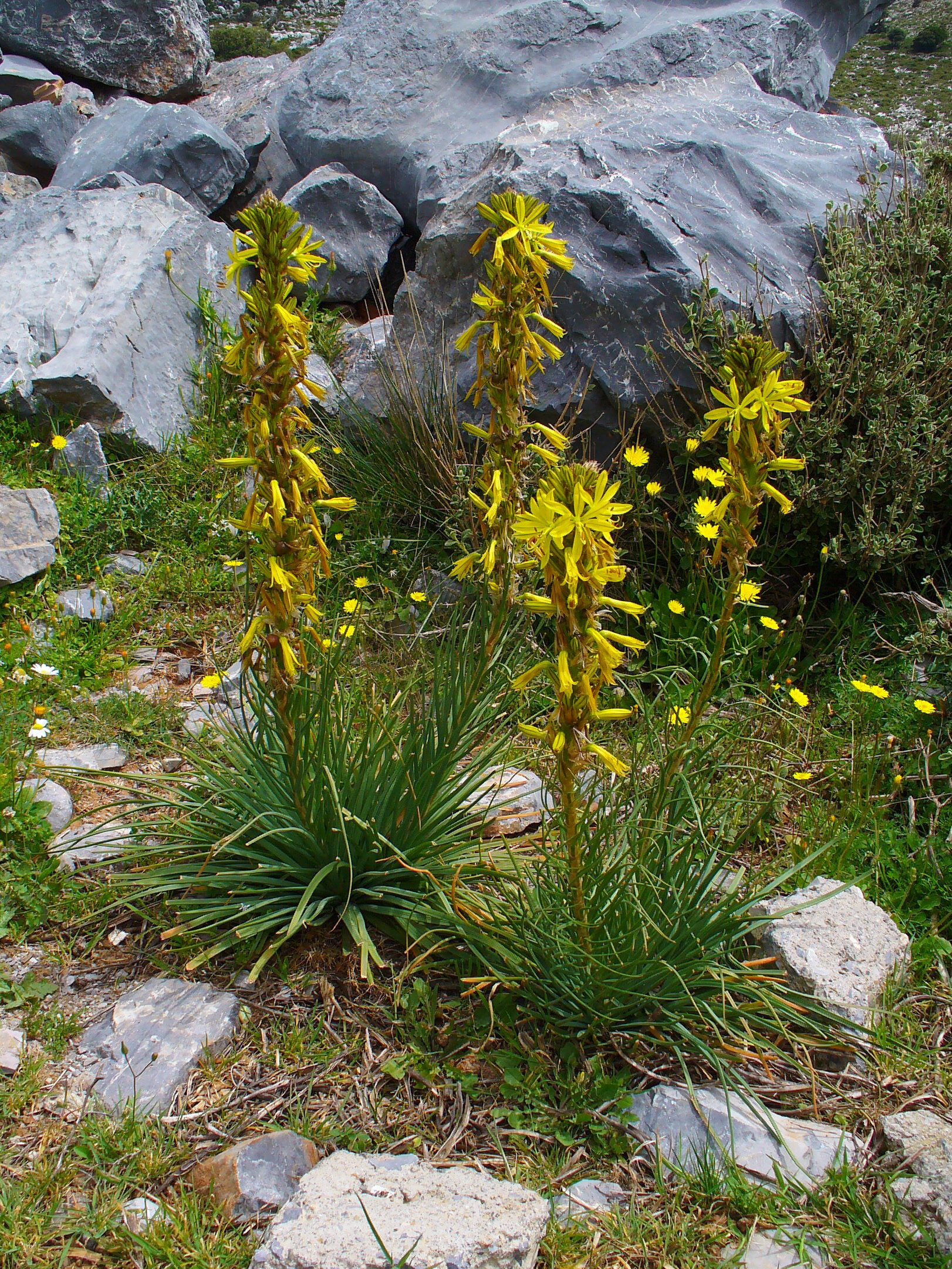
Asphodeline lutea, habitus

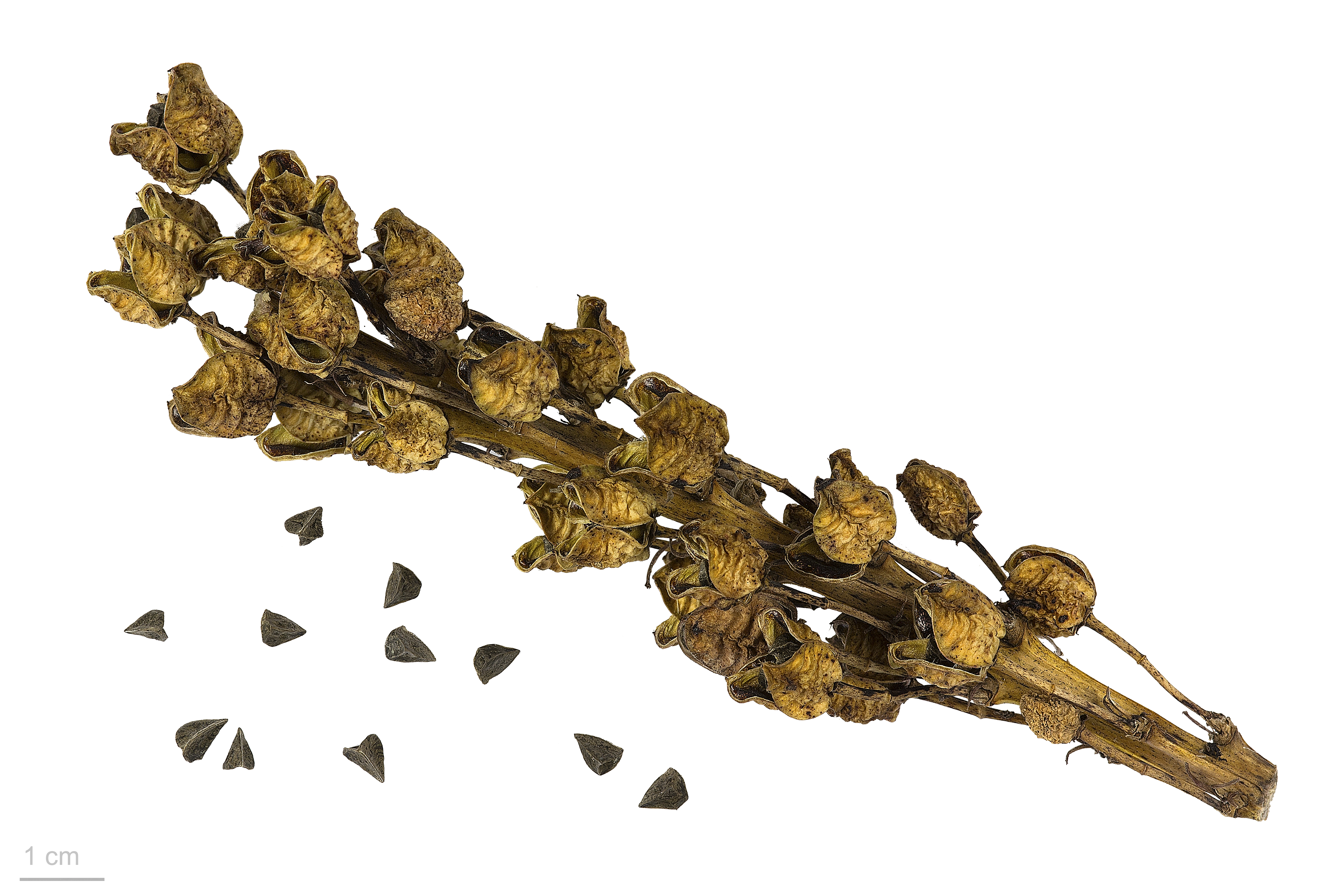
Asphodeline lutea - MHNT

Asphodeline lutea (king's spear, yellow asphodel) is a perennial plant native to southeastern Europe, northern Africa, the Caucasus and the Levant. It is grown as a landscaping plant.

It has been associated with the Asphodel of the Ancient Greek underworld, but so has the closely related Asphodelus ramosus.

== Description ==
Asphodeline lutea reaches 3 to 4 ft (0.9 to 1.2 m) tall and 1 to 2 ft (0.3 to 0.6 m) wide. The grey-green leaves are 1 ft (0.3 m) tall, with the flower stalk growing 3 to 4 ft (0.9 to 1.2 m) bearing a dense raceme of 1 in (2.5 cm) bright yellow flowers.

== History ==
Asphodeline lutea was introduced into the University of Oxford Botanic Garden in 1648, even though it demonstrated no known uses that are typical of a physic garden (plants grown for medicinal use). One of the curators of the garden at the time, John Parkinson, said the plant was "not... used in Physicke for any purpose." The locals in the Mediterranean who were interviewed by Parkinson said the plant had "no... propertie appropriate unto it but knavery," with no explanation of the particular knavery of which the plant was guilty. The description in the Botanic Garden used the old name of Asphodelus lutea.
