= António Xavier Pereira Coutinho =

Portuguese botanist and agronomist

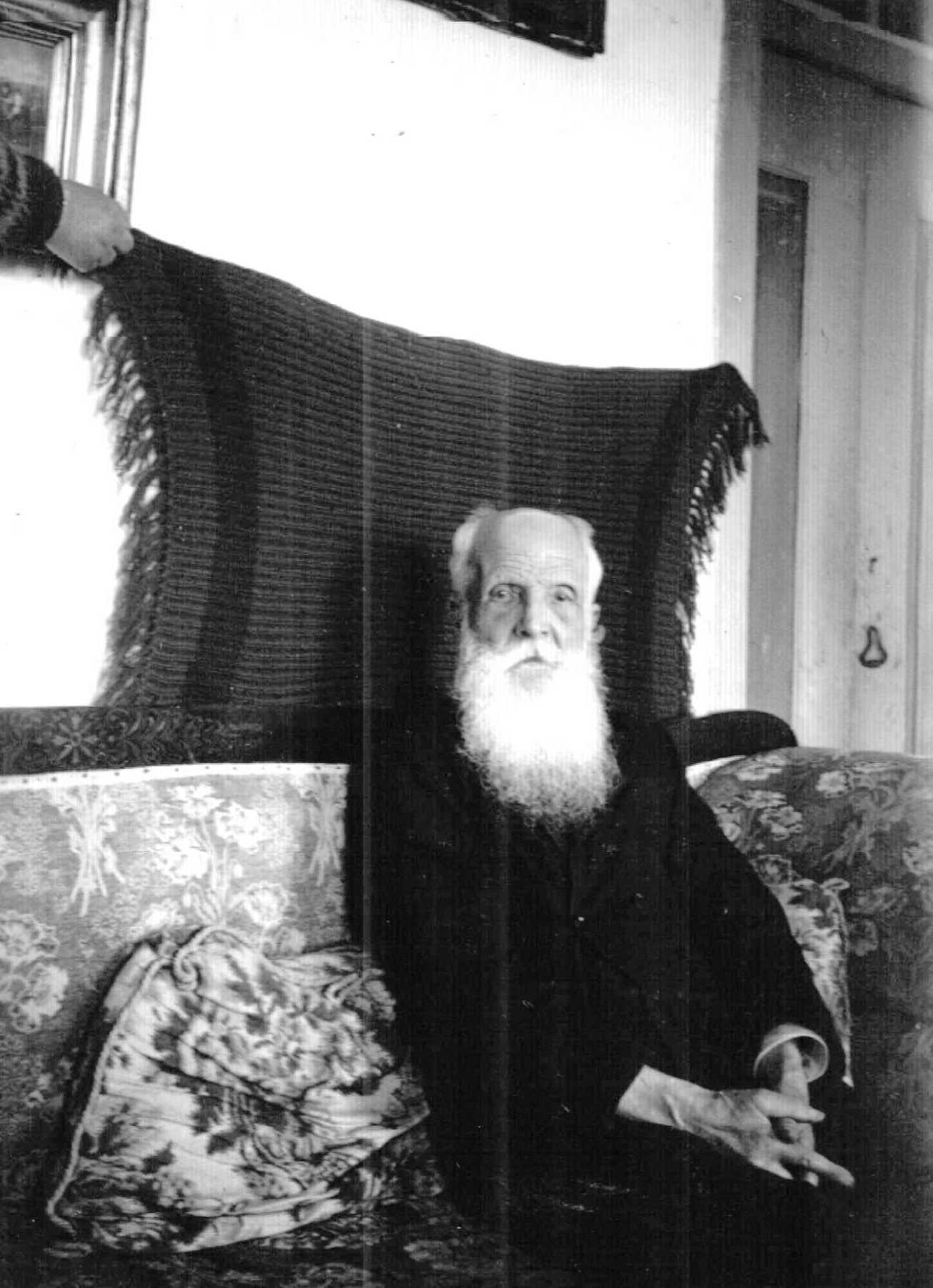
- Born: 11 June 1851; Santo Estêvão, Lisbon, Portugal
- Died: 27 March 1939 (aged 87); Alcabideche, Cascais, Portugal

António Xavier Pereira Coutinho (11 June 1851 - 27 March 1939) was a Portuguese botanist and agronomist, born in Santo Estêvão, Lisbon. He published two editions of The Flora of Portugal, and is the scientific authority for a hundred plant taxa, across many families. He died at Alcabideche, aged 87

== Publications ==
- Pereira Coutinho, A.X. (1913). Flora de Portugal (plantas vasculares) disposta em chaves dichotomicas. A (1st ed.). Lisbon.
- Pereira Coutinho, A.X. (1939). Flora de Portugal (plantas vasculares) disposta em chaves dichotomicas. A (2nd ed.). Lisbon.
