= List of war deities =

A war god in mythology associated with war, combat, or bloodshed. They occur commonly in polytheistic religions.

Unlike most gods and goddesses in polytheistic religions, monotheistic deities have traditionally been portrayed in their mythologies as commanding war in order to spread religion. (The intimate connection between "holy war" and the "one true god" belief of monotheism has been noted by many scholars, including Jonathan Kirsch in his book God Against The Gods: The History of the War Between Monotheism and Polytheism and Joseph Campbell in The Masks of God, Vol. 3: Occidental Mythology.)

The following is a list of war deities:

== Africa ==
=== Egyptian ===
Sekhmet, an Egyptian goddess of warfare

- Anat-- also known as Anath-- was a goddess of fertility, sexuality, love, and war. She was the sister of Baal
- Anhur, god of war, not a native god
- Anuke, a goddess of war and consort of Anhur
- Apedemak, the lion god of war: he is sometimes depicted with three heads
- Bast, cat-headed goddess associated with war, protection of Lower Egypt and the pharaoh, the sun, perfumes, ointments, and embalming
- Horus, god of the king, the sky, war, and protection
- Maahes, lion-headed god of war
- Menhit, goddess of war, "she who massacres"
- Montu, falcon-headed god of war, valor, and the Sun
- Neith, goddess of war, hunting, and wisdom
- Pakhet, goddess of war
- Satis, deification of the floods of the Nile River and an early war, hunting, and fertility goddess
- Sekhmet, goddess of warfare, pestilence, and the desert
- Set, god of the desert and storms, associated with war
- Sobek, god of the Nile, the army, military, fertility, and crocodiles
- Sopdu, god of the scorching heat of the summer sun, associated with war
- Wepwawet, wolf-god of war and death who later became associated with Anubis and the afterlife

=== Berber ===
- Gurzil, bull-headed warrior god.

=== Nilo-Saharan ===
Nubian

- Apedemak, Nubian lion-headed warrior god.

=== Western African-Congo ===
Yoruba

- Ogun, oriṣa of war and iron
- Oya, warrior oriṣa of storms and the dead.

=== Eastern African-Congo ===
Igbo

- Amadioha
- Ekwensu

=== Ethiopian ===
- Maher, god of war.

=== Kenya ===
Kalenjin

- Boryet, Kipsigis Death-wielding god of war. Boryet (also luket) is the act of war. Death (Me'et) is observed as a consequence of war. War is thus personified as such.

=== Ghanaian ===
Akan

- Tano, god of war and strife for the Akan, and additionally god of thunder for the northern Akan peoples, such as the Asante
- Sakumo, the deity of war and duels, guardian of the Ga tribe.
- Afua Kranka, goddess of conquest, bloodlust, brutality, war, and battle.
- Nkunim, spirit of victory in battle.

== Europe ==
=== Balto-Slavic ===
==== Baltic ====
- Kara Māte, Latvian goddess of war
- Kauriraris, Lithuanian god of war and war steeds
- Junda, Lithuanian goddess of war
- Perkūnas, god of thunder and lightning, associated with war

==== Slavic ====
- Jarovit, god of vegetation, fertility, and spring, also associated with war and harvest
- Perun, god of thunder and lightning, associated with war
- Svetovid, god of war, fertility, and abundance
- Zorya Utrennyaya, goddess of the morning star, sometimes depicted as a warrior goddess who protected men in battle

=== Celtic ===
- Agrona, reconstructed Proto-Celtic name for the river Aeron in Wales, and possibly the name of an associated war goddess
- Alaisiagae, a pair of goddesses worshipped in Roman Britain, with parallel Celtic and Germanic titles
- Andarta, Brittonic goddess theorized to be associated with victory, overcoming enemies, war
- Andraste, Gaulish warrior goddess
- Anann, Irish goddess of war, death, predicting death in battle, cattle, prosperity, and fertility
- Atepomarus, god of horses, horsemen, and healing.
- Badb, Irish goddess of war who took the form of a crow; member of the Morrígan
- Bandua, Gallaecian god of war
- Belatucadros, war god worshipped by soldiers and equated with the Roman war god Mars
- Camulus, god of war of the Belgic Remi and British Trinovantes
- Catubodua, Gaulish goddess assumed to be associated with victory
- Caturix, god of war
- Cicolluis, Gaulish and Irish god associated with war
- Cocidius, Romano-British god associated with war, hunting and forests
- Macha, Irish goddess associated with war, horses, and sovereignty; member of the Morrígan
- Mars Cnabetius, Gaelic god of war
- The Morrígan, Irish triple goddess associated with sovereignty, prophecy, war, and death on the battlefield
- Neit, Irish god of war, husband of Nemain of Badb
- Nemain, Irish goddess of the frenzied havoc of war; member of the Morrígan
- Rudianos, Gaulish god of war
- Segomo, Gaulish god of war
- Teutates, British and Gaulish god of war and the tribe

==== Lusitanian ====
- Neto, god believed to be associated with war, death, and weaponry

=== Norse-Germanic ===
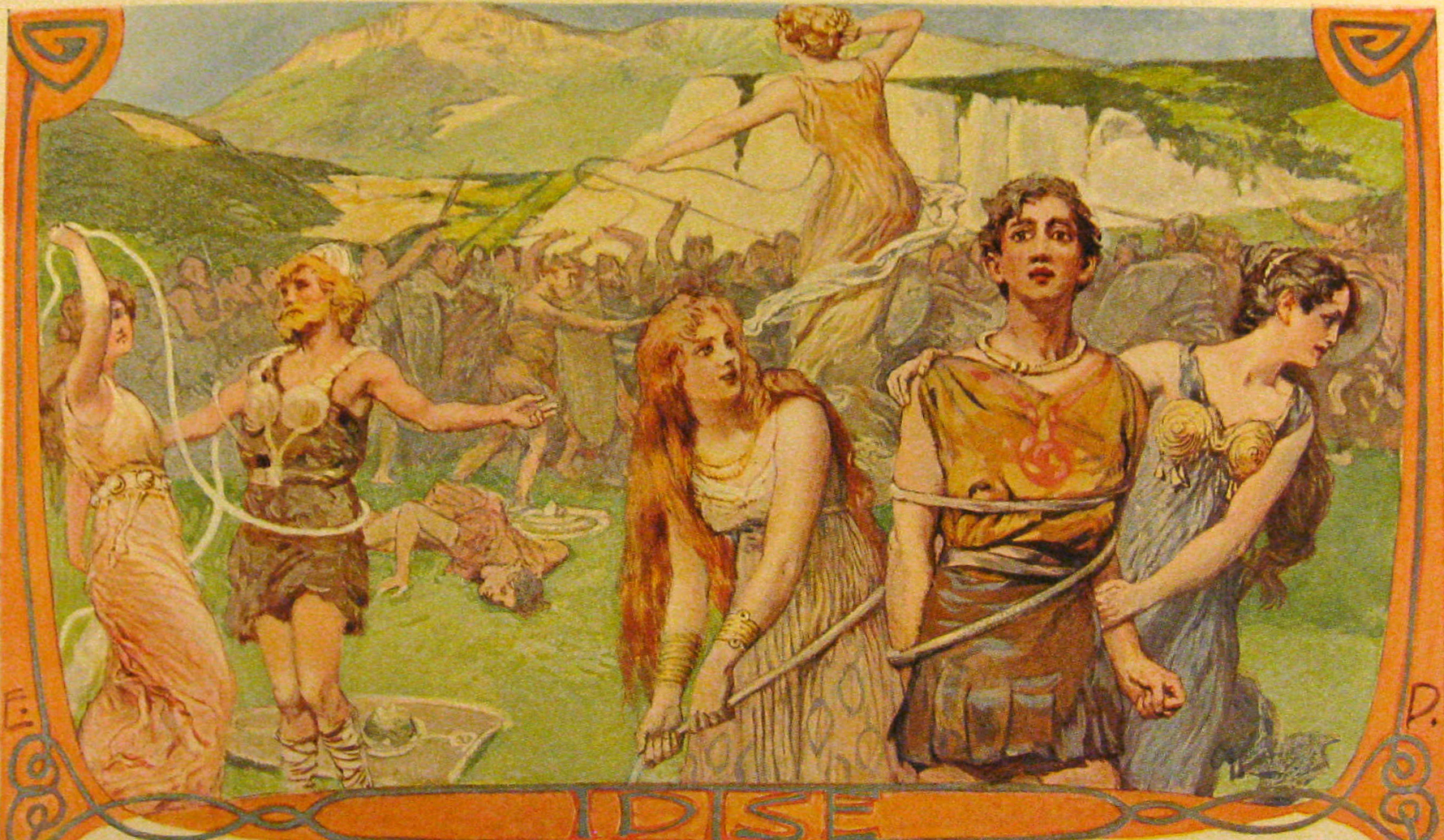
Idise by Emil Doepler

==== Continental Germanic ====
- Baduhenna, a western Frisii goddess of warfare
- Idis (Germanic)/itis/ides, the West Germanic cognates of North Germanic dís, they are connected with battle magic and fettering enemy armies
- Sandraudiga, goddess whose name may mean "she who dyes the sand red", suggesting she is a war deity or at least has a warrior aspect
- Týr, god of war, single combat, law, justice, and the thing, who later lost much of his religious importance and mythical role to the god Wōden
- Wōden, god associated with wisdom, poetry, war, victory, and death

==== Norse ====
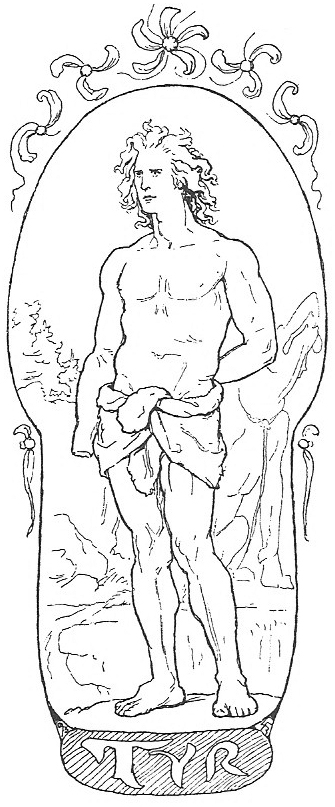
Týr, a Norse god of war

- Dís, a group of lesser goddesses who are sometimes connected with battle magic; valkyrie may be a kenning for them
- Freyja, goddess associated with love, beauty, fertility, gold, seiðr, war, and death
- Odin, god associated with wisdom, war, battle, and death
- Týr, god associated with law, justice, victory, and heroic glory
- Ullr, god associated with archery, skiing, bows, hunting, single combat, and glory
- Valkyries, choosers of the slain and connected to Odin, ruler of Valhalla; they may be the same as the dís above

=== Graeco-Roman ===
==== Greek / Hellenic ====
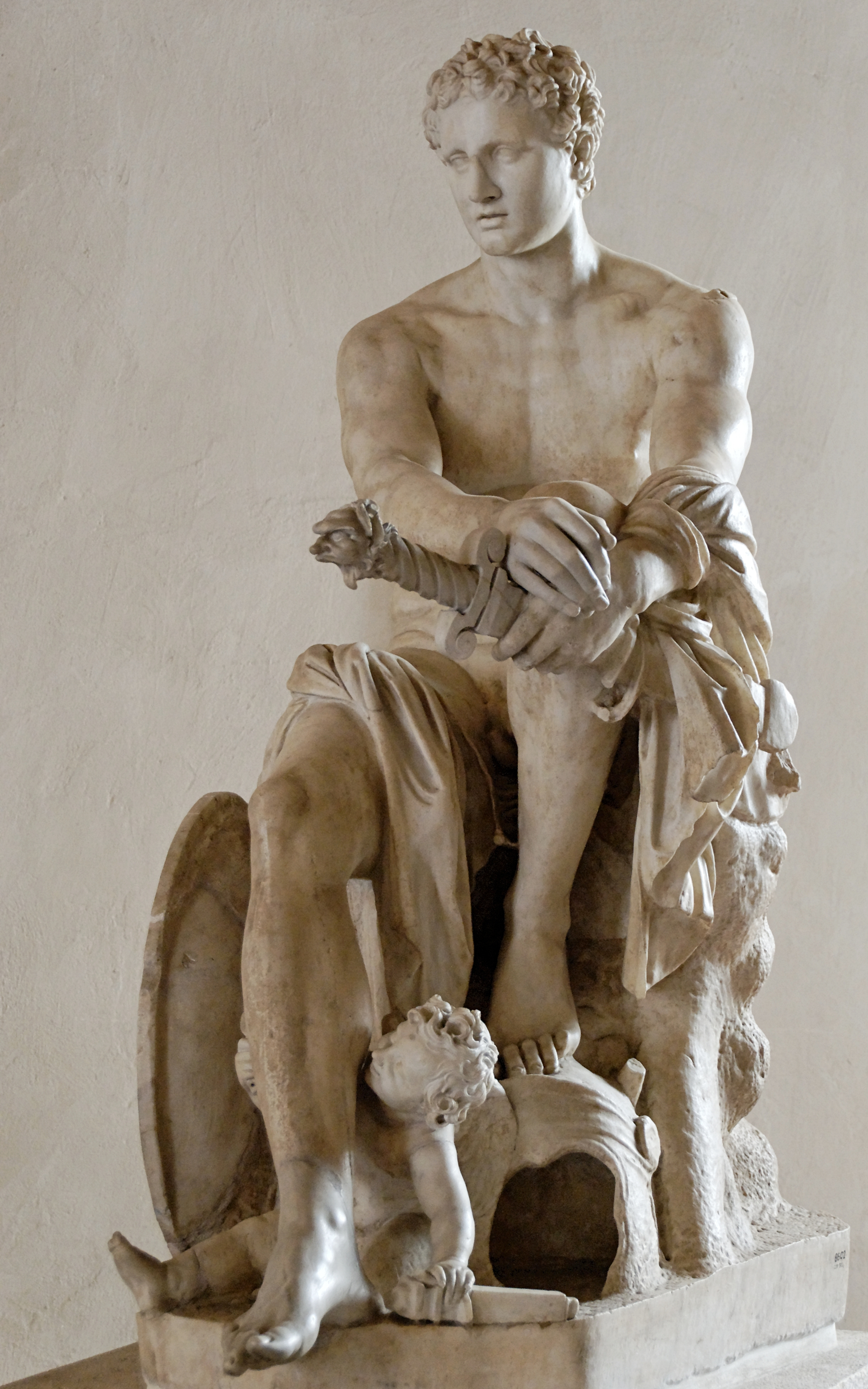
Ares, the Greek god of war

- Alala, spirit of the war cry
- Alke, spirit of courage and battle-strength
- Amphillogiai, goddesses of disputes
- Androktasiai, spirits of battlefield slaughter
- Ares, the main Greek god of war
- Athena, goddess of wisdom, war strategy, and weaving
- Bia, personification of force and compulsion
- Castor and Pollux, twin brothers that were the gods of war, sailors, and the constellation Gemini.
- Deimos, personification of terror
- Enyalius, god of war; in early periods apparently an epithet of Ares, they were differentiated later
- Enyo, goddess of war, sometimes appears to be identical to Eris
- Eris, goddess of discord and strife
- Hera, in the Illiad she has a martial character and fights (victoriously) against Artemis; however, this warlike aspect of her appears nowhere else in the surviving corpus, suggesting it was dropped early on
- Homados, spirit of the din of battle
- Hysminai, female spirits of fighting and combat
- Ioke, spirit of onslaught, battle-tumult, and pursuit
- Keres, female spirits of violent or cruel death, including death in battle, by accident, murder, or ravaging disease
- Kratos, personification of strength and power
- Kydoimos, spirit of the din of battle
- Makhai, male spirits of fighting and combat
- Nike, personification of victory
- Palioxis, spirit of backrush, flight, and retreat from battle
- Pallas, Titan god of war-craft and of the springtime campaign season
- Perses, the Titan of destruction
- Phobos, spirit of panic, fear, flight, and battlefield rout
- Phonoi, spirits of murder, killing, and slaughter
- Polemos, spirit of war
- Proioxis, spirit of onrush and battlefield pursuit
- Zelus, personification of zeal
- Zeus Stratios, Zeus had the epithet Stratios (Στράτιος), which means "of armies".

==== Roman ====
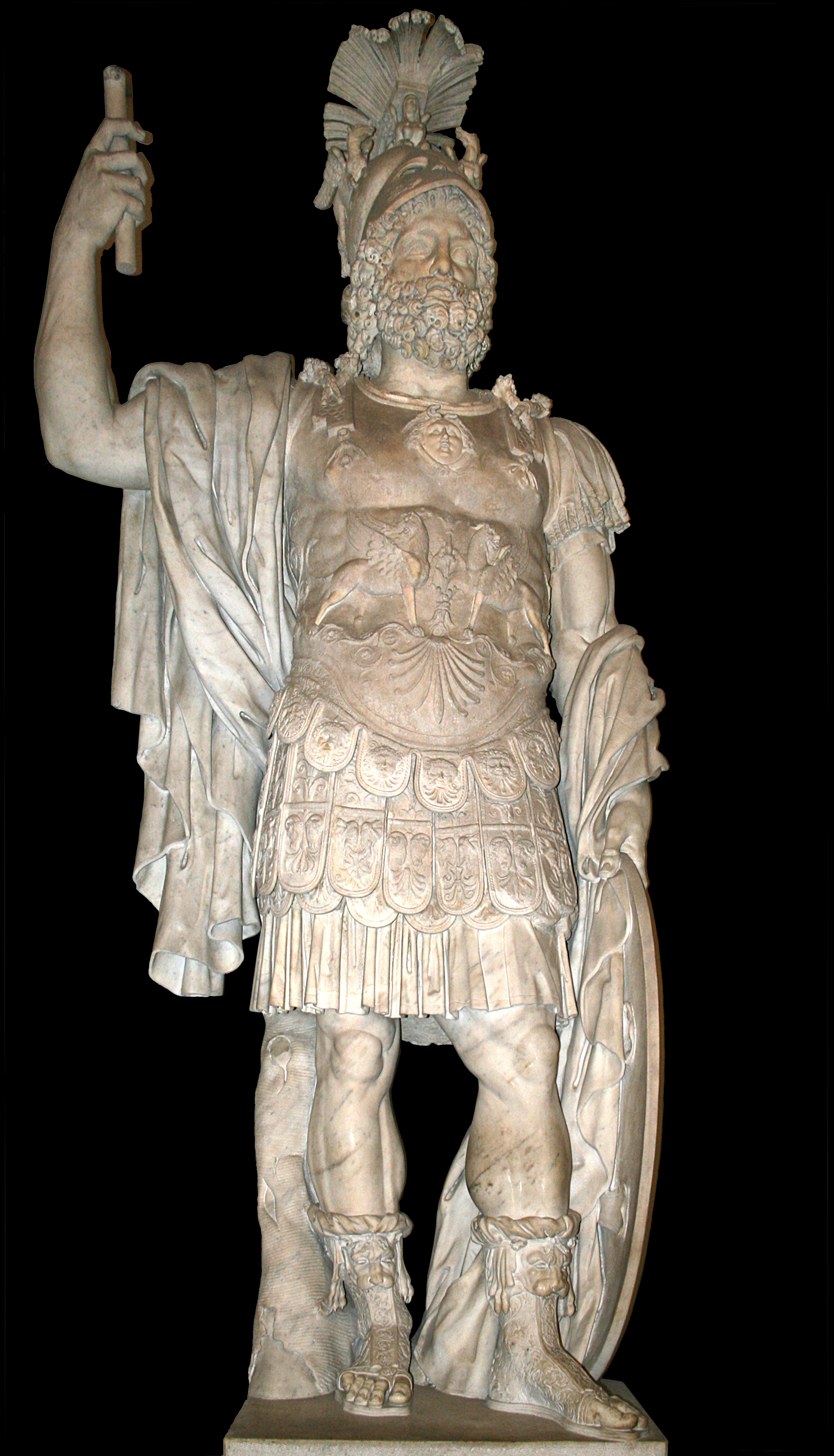
Mars, the Roman god of war

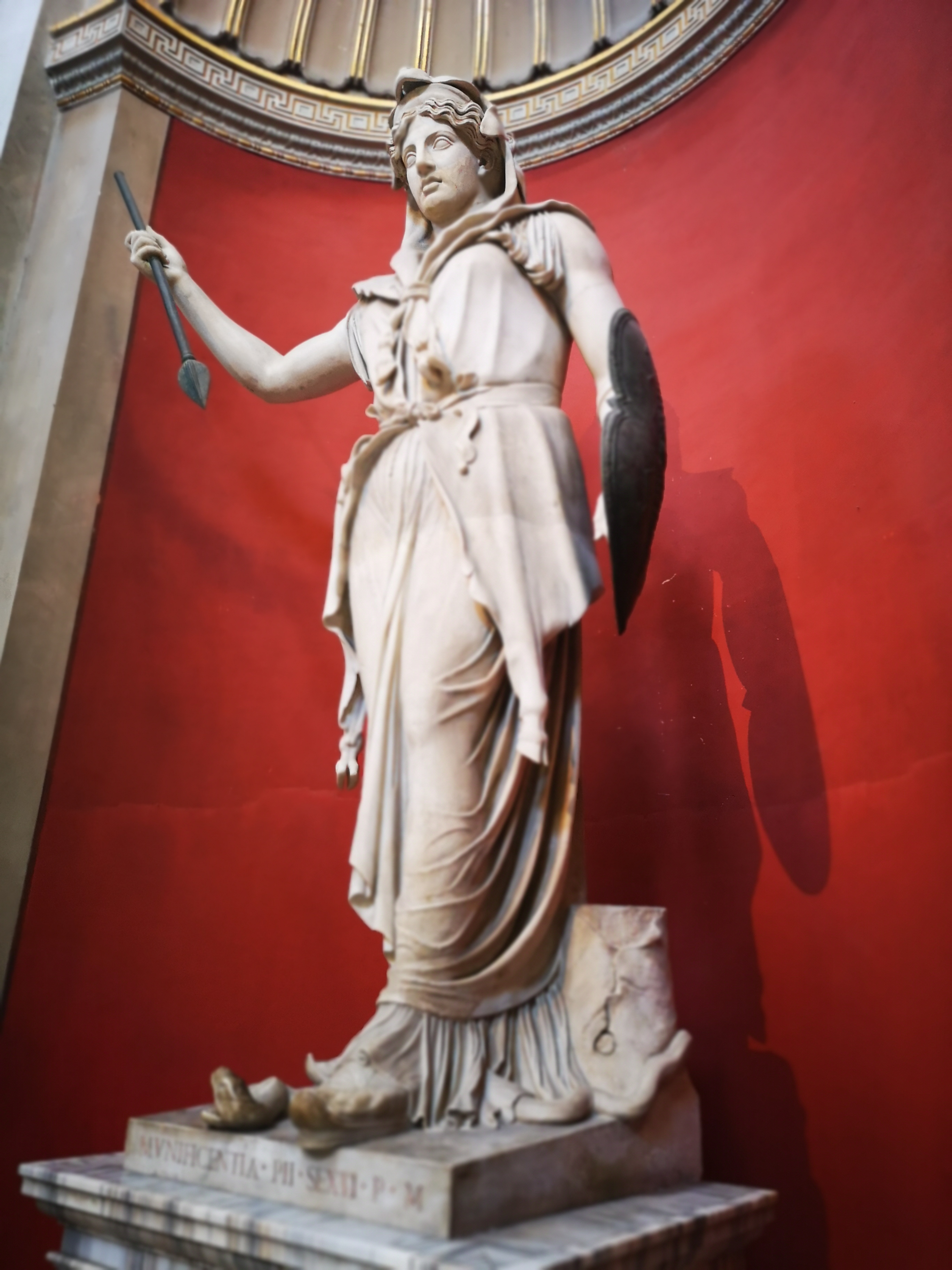
Juno Sospita Statue holding a spear and shield

- Bellona, goddess of war
- Hercules Invictus
- Honos, god of chivalry, honor, and military justice
- Juno, has a consistent martial character and the patron goddess of Rome, the mother of Mars and Bellona
- Mars, god of war and agriculture, equivalent to Ares as far as being war gods; aside from this they have very little in common
- Nerio, warrior goddess and personification of valor
- Victoria, personification of victory, equivalent to the Greek goddess Nike
- Virtus, god of bravery and military strength

Etruscan

- Laran, god of war.
- Menrva, goddess of war, art, wisdom, and health

=== Balkan ===
- Danubian Rider
- Sabazios
- Thracian Rider

=== Uralic ===
==== Hungarian ====
- Hadúr, god of war and the metalsmith of the god

Finnish

- Ukko, god of the weather, sky and thunder, often associated with fertility and war

== Asia ==
=== Turkic ===
- Kyzaghan, Turkic deity of war

=== Mongolian ===
- Begtse, originally a Mongolian war god, was later adopted into Tibetan Buddhism
- Dayisun Tngri

=== East Asia ===
==== Chinese ====
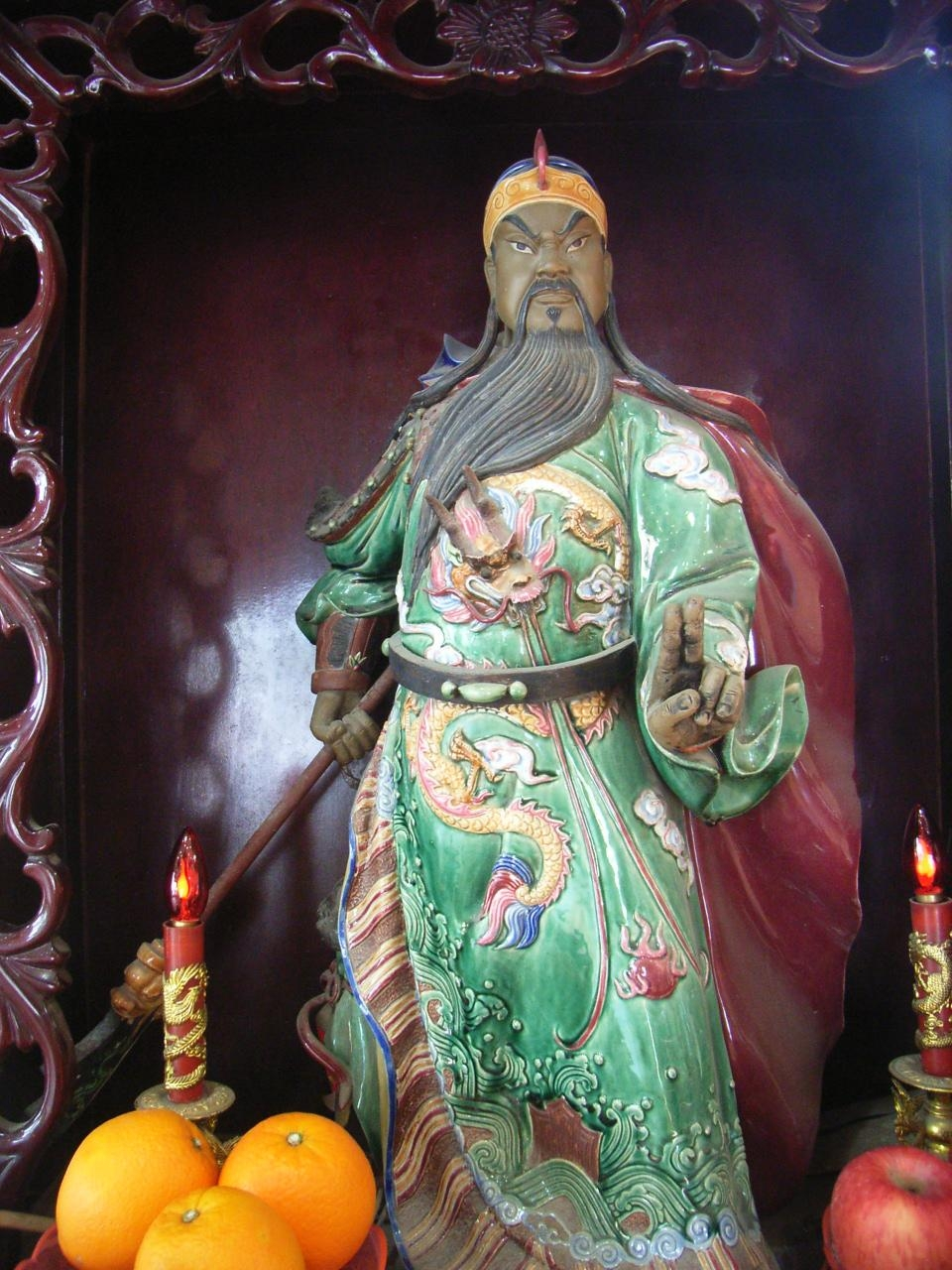
Guan Yu, Chinese god of loyalty, righteousness, and valor

- Chiyou, god of war
- Di Qing, Star of Military Fortune, God of Valor
- Erlang Shen, a three-eyed warrior
- Guan Yu, Han dynasty general. God of loyalty, righteousness, and valor.
- Jinzha, marshal of the center altar
- Jiutian Xuannü, goddess of war, sex, and longevity
- Li Jing, Guardian of Celestial Palace
- Muzha, marshal of the center altar
- Nezha
- Wang Shan, Song dynasty general. Primordial Lord-General of Heaven. Guardian of Celestial Palace
- Wen Qiong
- Yue Fei
- Zhao Lang (Zhao Gongming), God of Military Fortune, Guardian of Celestial Palace, Protector of Households
- Xue Rengui, Tang dynasty general.

==== Japanese ====
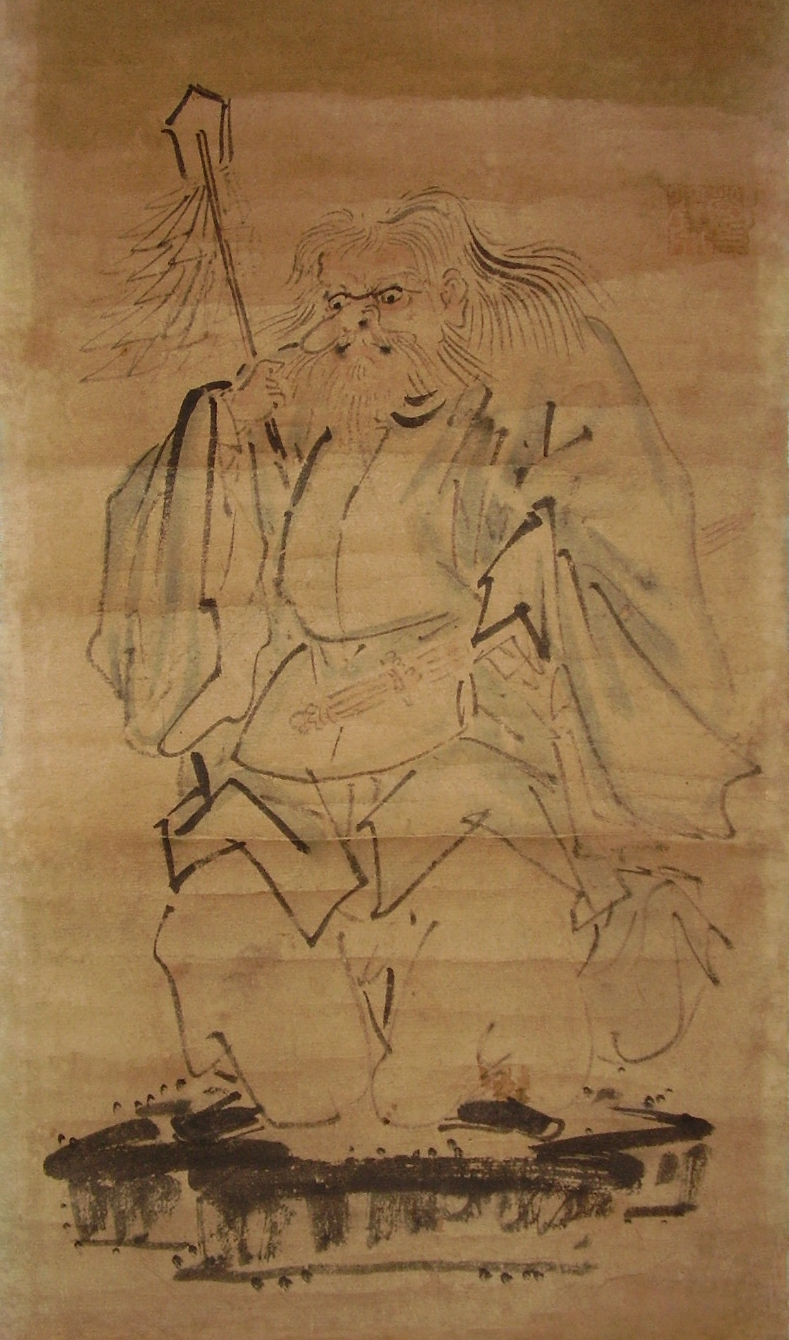
Sarutahiko, the Japanese god of war

- Futsunushi, god of swords, warfare and martial arts, and conquest; General of Amaterasu and god of the Mononobe clan
- Hachiman Daimyōjin, Shinto god of war (on land) and agriculture, divine protector of the Minamoto clan; mostly worshipped by samurai
- Sarutahiko, god of war and misogi.
- Takemikazuchi, god of war, conquest, martial arts, sumo, swords, and lightning; general of the Amatsukami; god of Kashima and Ujigami of Nakatomi clan
- Suwa Myōjin (Takeminakata-no-kami), god of hunting, valor and duty, protector of the Japanese religion
- Bishamonten, god of war who protected Buddhist temples

==== Korean ====
- Ch'oe Yŏng, general of Goryeo period, god of shamans, protector of humanity.
- Pagunseong, the star at the edge of the Big Dipper in Taoism, symbolizing swords.
- Baekmashinjang, god of war who rides a white horse.
- Dungapshinjang, god of war who has the ability of shapeshifting.
- Byeorakshinjang, god of war who uses thunder and lightning, sometimes punishes the evil.
- Damuncheonwang, Buddhist god of war.
- Seonangshin, a god of war

=== Southeast Asia ===
==== Filipino ====
- Chacha’: the Bontok god of warriors
- Hipag: the Ifugao spirits of war that give soldiers courage on the field of war but are ferocious and cannibalistic
- Apolaqui: the Pangasinense war god
- Aring Sinukûan: the Kapampangan solar deity governing war and death. He taught early humans metallurgy, woodcutting, rice cultivation, and warfare
- Apolake: the Tagalog god of the sun and warriors
- Sidapa: another Tagalog god of war, he specifically settles conflicts among mortals
- Doce Pares: From the Spanish "Twelve Pairs", they are a group of twelve young Tagalog men who went on a quest to retrieve the Golden Calf of Mount Banahaw, together with José Rizal as a culture hero. They are said to return as giants, bearing the Golden Calf, to aid mankind in war.
- Balangaw: a Hiligaynon and Bisaya god of the rainbow and war
- Inaginid: a Hiligaynon and Bisaya god of war.
- Makanduk: a Hiligaynon and Bisaya god of war.
- Lumalayag: the Tagbanwa spirits who challenge and fight the Salakap, spirits of plague and sickness.
- Talagbusao: the bloodthirsty Bukidnon god of war.
- Pamdiya: the Manobo gods who initiate and preside over war.
- Darago: the Bagobo god of warriors, whose consort is Mandarangan.
- Mandarangan: the Bagobo war deity married to Darago and resides at the top of Mount Apo. Human sacrifices made to him are rewarded with health, valour in war, and success in the pursuit of wealth.

==== Vietnamese ====
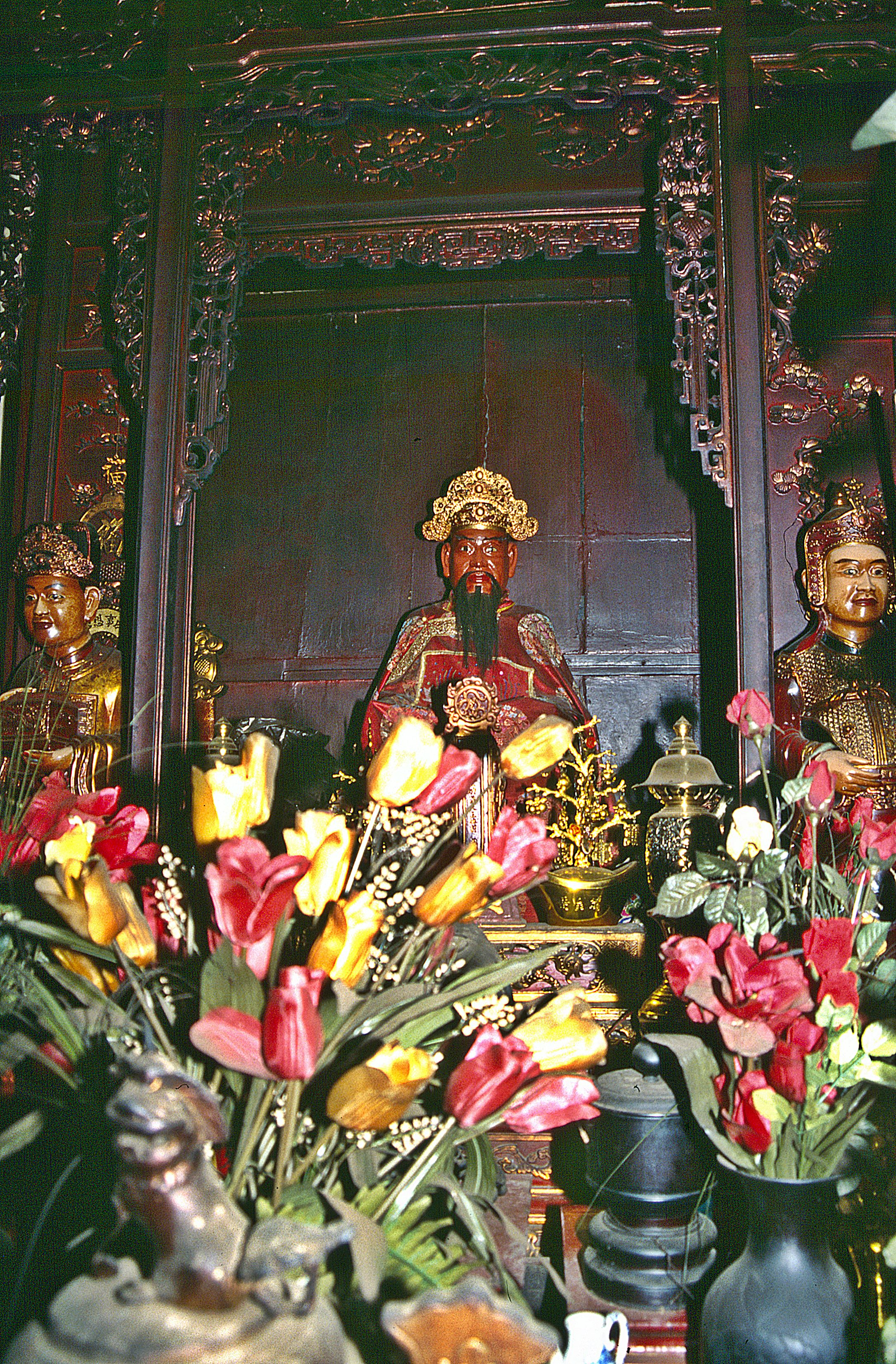
Trần Hưng Đạo, Vietnamese god of exorcism and the god of war

- Cao Lỗ, god of military innovations
- Độc Cước, the protector of coastal settlements. Legend has it that he split himself in two with his axe, each half guards coastal villages against sea ogres.
- Đồng Cổ, the armored protector of the Lý dynasty.
- Liễu Hạnh, goddess of earth, heaven and war.
- Thánh Gióng, god of triumph over foreign invaders.
- Trần Hưng Đạo, is the national hero of the Vietnamese people, after his death he was honored as the god of exorcism and the god of war.

=== South Asia ===
==== Hindu ====
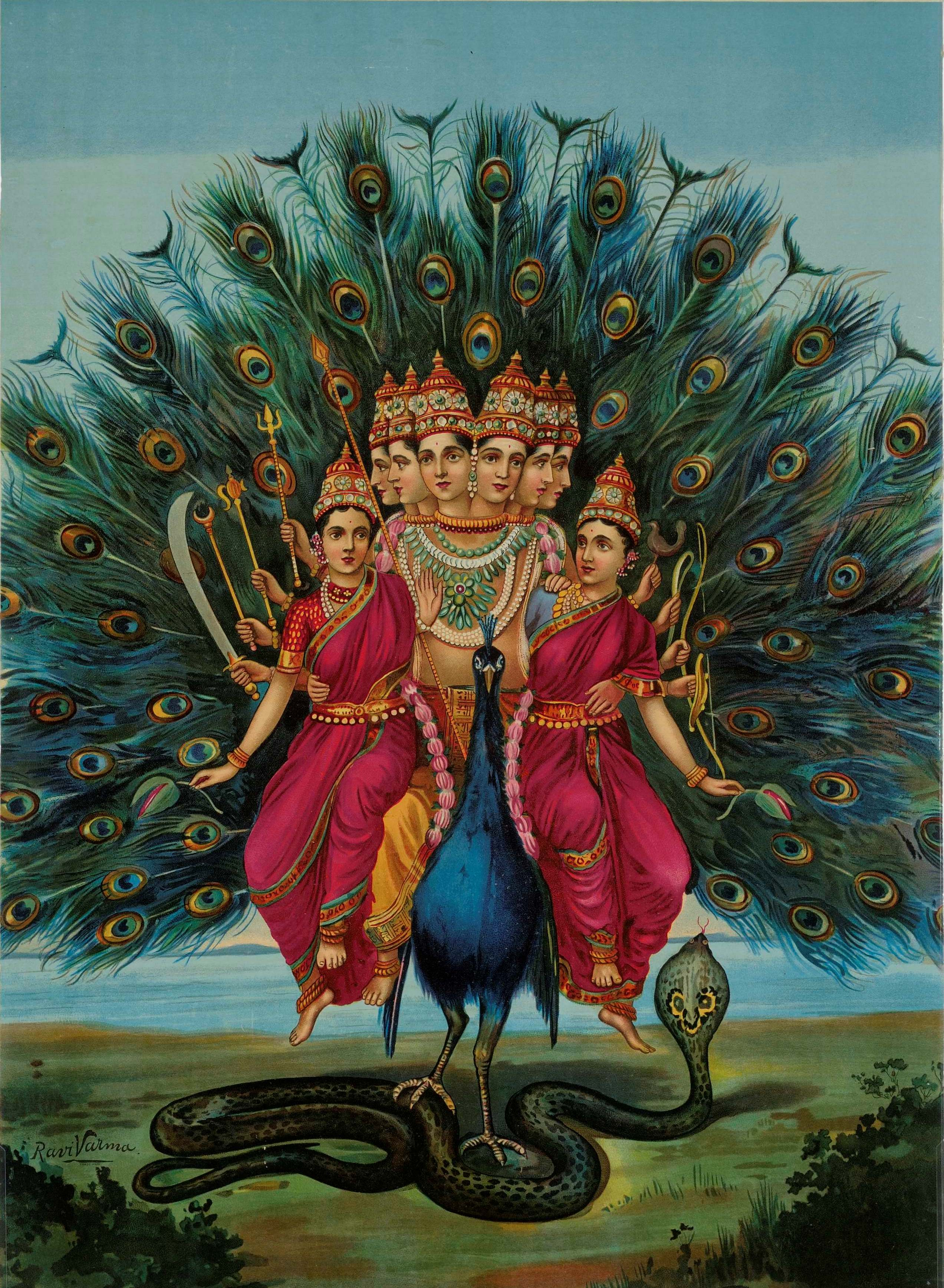
Kartikeya, the Hindu god of war, youth and wisdom.

- Indra, God of heaven, kingship, thunder, rains, the gods, and the senses
- Ayyappan, warrior deity
- Mangala, God of war and Mars
- Nirrti, Goddess of strife
- Parvati, and her forms of Durga, Kali and Korravai
- Kartikeya God of war, God of youth and wisdom.

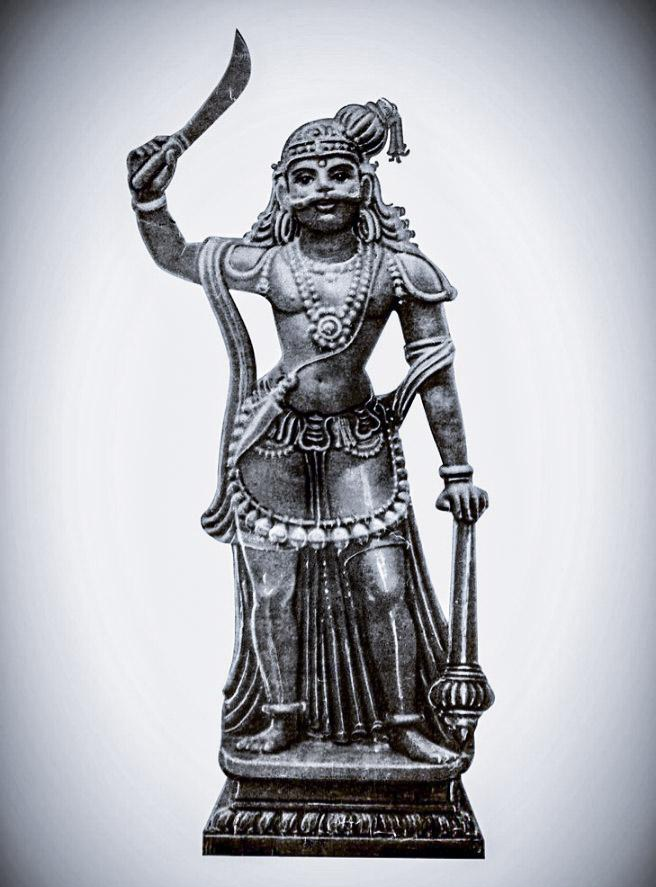
Karuppaswamy statue / artifact image

- Karuppannaswamy, God of war, prominent guardian deity

==== Manipuri ====
- Marjing, god of war, polo, horses and sports.
- Panthoibi, goddess of war, love, courage and longevity.

==== Sinhalese ====
- Kataragama deviyo (කතරගම දෙවියෝ), Kartikeya, god of war and god of victory
- Sri Siddha Suniyam Deviyo ශ්‍රී සිද්ධ සූනියම් දෙවියෝ, god of cavalry, god of war, god of warriors
- Rajasinha I of Sitawaka
- Maha Sona (මහා සෝනා), god of war, god of cemeteries, god of death, god of warriors
- Reeri Yakseya (රීරි යක්ෂයා), god of death, god of war, god of sacrifice
- Kalu Kambili Deviyo (කළු කම්බිලි දෙවියෝ), god of revenge, god of war, god of warriors

=== West Asia ===
==== Armenian ====
- Anahit, goddess of healing, fertility, wisdom, and water; in early periods associated with war
- Nane, goddess of war and wisdom

==== Canaanite ====
- Baal, god of fertility, storms, and war
- Anat, goddess of war
- Astarte, goddess of sex and war, western Semitic version of the Mesopotamian Ishtar and Inanna
- Resheph, god of plague and war
- Tanit, main Carthaginian goddess whose functions included war and the moon

==== Hebrew ====
- Yahweh, God of gods, able to wage war, but not his primary disposition.

==== Hittite ====
- Šulinkatte, god of war of Hattian origin
- Wurrukatte, god of war of Hattian origin
- Iyarri, god of war and plague

==== Hurrian ====
- Aštabi, a war god of Eblaite origin
- Ḫešui, a war god
- Nupatik, a god assumed to have warlike character
- Shaushka, goddess of love, war, and healing
- Ugur, a war god of Mesopotamian origin

==== Mesopotamian ====
- Adad, a weather god often portrayed as a warrior
- Erra, a god of war associated with Nergal, later syncretised with him
- Ilaba, warlike tutelary god of the kings of the Akkadian Empire
- Inanna, Sumerian goddess of love, sex and war
- Ishtar, Akkadian (later Assyrian and Babylonian) counterpart of Inanna
- Nergal, god of war, the underworld, and pestilence
- Ninazu, a god of the underworld who could also be portrayed as a war deity
- Ningishzida, a god of the underworld who like his father Ninazu could be portrayed as a warrior
- Ninurta, warrior god
- Pabilsag, warrior god and husband of Ninisina
- Pap-nigin-gara, a war god syncretised with Ninurta
- Sebitti, group of minor war gods best attested in Assyria
- Shara, minor Sumerian god of war
- Tishpak, a warrior god from Eshnunna
- Zababa, tutelary god of Kish and a war god

==== Nuristani ====
- Great Gish, god of war

== Oceania ==
=== Polynesia ===
- 'Oro, god of war
- Rongo, Mangaian god of war and taro

=== Hawaiian ===
- Kū, god of war and birds
- Pele, goddess of fire, lightning, dance, volcanoes, and violence

=== Māori ===
- Maru, god of war and fresh water
- Tūmatauenga, god of war and human activities

== Americas ==
=== North America ===
==== Great Plains ====
- Morning Star, O-pi-ri-kus by one spelling; the god of war in Pawnee mythology

==== Pacific Northwest ====
- Qamaits, Nuxalk warrior goddess
- Winalagalis, Kwakwaka'wakw god of war

=== Central American and the Caribbean ===
==== Aztec ====
- Patterns of War
  - Huitzilopochtli, god of will, authority, war, conflict, light, victory, heroic deeds, and sun; patron of the polar south, often compels Tlaloc to bring about rain
  - Mixcoatl, god of battle, hunting, civilisation, and stars
  - Tlaloc, god of thunder, rain, fertility, child sacrifice, drought, and storms; sometimes associated with the south
  - Xipe-Totec, patron of war, agriculture, vegetation, creation, fertility; patron of diseases, pubescent development, rebirth, hunting, trades, human sacrifice, chores, spring, and cardinal east
  - Tezcatlipoca, god of night, darkness, lunar light, creation, providence, power, disorder-disarray, destruction, beauty, tricks, merriment, uninhibited sexuality, deception, virility, mystery, polar north, and winter; also a chthonic deity
  - Xiuhtecuhtli, god of fire, old age, daytime, kingship, the hearth, warmth, chronicles of time, and renewal

==== Mayan ====
- Tohil, god associated with fire, the sun, rain, mountains, and war
- Buluc Chabtan, Mayan god of war, violence and gambling.
- Cadmaela, Mayan goddess of war.

==== Voodoo ====
- Ogoun, loa who presides over fire, iron, hunting, politics, and war
