= Olethros =

Ancient Greek god of havoc

In Ancient Greek mythology, Olethros /ˈɒlɪˌθrɒs/ (Greek: ὄλεθρος) was the Greek concept or personification of "havoc" or "ruin".

Olethros translates roughly in ancient Greek to "destruction", but often with a positive connotation, as in the destruction required for and preceding renewal.

== Greek mythology ==
Olethros as a deity is primarily attested in the Homeric works of Quintus Smyrnaeus, where he is closely related to Moros, Doom, as a personification of death.

Sore distressed with dust and deadly conflict were the folk. Then with a sudden hand some Blessed One swept the dust-pall aside; and the Gods saw the deadly Keres hurling the charging lines together, in the unending wrestle locked of that grim conflict, saw where never ceased Ares from hideous slaughter, saw the earth crimsoned all round with rushing streams of blood, saw where dark Olethros gloated o'er the scene

== Biblical use of olethros ==
Strong's Exhaustive Concordance of the King James Bible defines the word as meaning "ruin"; i.e., death, punishment, or destruction. Olethros is found in the New Testament in 1 Corinthians 5:5, 1 Thessalonians 5:3, 2 Thessalonians 1:9, and 1 Timothy 6:9, where it is translated "destruction" in most versions of the Bible. Some believe a more accurate translation of this word in these verses would be "punishment," referring to the kind of punishment that expiates guilt and restores the sinner to communion with God. Biblical scholar Douglas J. Moo argues that, in 2 Thessalonians 1:9, the word should be understood to mean "ruin" rather than "extinction" because it is used alongside the Greek word aiōnios, meaning "eternal." Moo therefore believes that people in hell will not be annihilated, but will live eternally away from the presence of God.

== See also ==
- Controlled burn – Technique to reduce potential fuel for wildfire through managed burning
- Alala – Personification of the war cry in Greek mythology
- Alke – Name of multiple Greek mythological figures
- Agon – Ancient Greek personification of struggle or competition
- Coalemus – Mythological character
- Homados – Greek mythological personification of battle-noise
- Ioke – Greek mythological figure
- Palioxis – Greek war deity
- Polemus – Daemon in Greek mythology, a divine personification or embodiment of war
- Proioxis – Greek war deity
