= Kydoimos =

Personification of the noise of battle in ancient Greece

In Greek mythology, Kydoimos or Cydoemus /sɪˈdiːməs/ (Ancient Greek: Κυδοιμός Kudoimós) was the personification of the din of battle, confusion, uproar and hubbub. He was probably numbered amongst the Makhai, daimones of the battlefield. Kydoimos appears in Aristophanes' Peace as a character.

== Mythology ==
In the epic poem the Shield of Heracles, attributed to Hesiod, Proioxis was one of the many figures, depicted on Heracles' shield.

In his hands he (Herakles) took his shield, all glittering : no one ever broke it with a blow or crushed it. And a wonder it was to see . . . In the centre was Phobos (Fear) worked in adamant, unspeakable, staring backwards with eyes that glowed with fire. His mouth was full of teeth in a white row, fearful and daunting, and upon his grim brow hovered frightful Eris (Battle-Strife) who arrays the throng of men: pitiless she, for she took away the mind and senses of poor wretches who made war against the son of Zeus . . . Upon the shield Proioxis (Pursuit) and Palioxis (Flight) were wrought, and Homados (Tumult), and Phobos (Panic), and Androktasia (Slaughter). Eris (Battle-Strife) also, and Kydoimos (Confusion) were hurrying about, and deadly Ker (Fate) was there holding one man newly wounded. . .

== See also ==
- Alala
- Alke
- Ioke
- Polemus
