= Phonoi =

Figures in Greek mythology

In Greek mythology, the Phonoi (Ancient Greek: Φόνοι, lit. 'Murders, Slaughterings', from the plural of φόνος) are collectively the personification of murder. In Hesiod's Theogony, the Phonoi are listed among the children of Eris (Strife). The Phonoi are named in line 228 of the Theogony, which lists four personified plural abstractions, the Hysminai (Combats), the Machai (Battles), the Phonoi (Murders), and the Androktasiai (Slaughters), as being among the offspring of Eris (Strife):

Ὑσμίνας τε Μάχας τε Φόνους τ’ Ἀνδροκτασίας τε

The nearly identical line, listing the same four abstractions (without capitalizations, and with different case endings), in the same order, occurs in Homer's Odyssey, where Odysseus describes the decorations on Heracles' golden belt:

ὑσμῖναί τε μάχαι τε φόνοι τ᾿ ἀνδροκτασίαι τε.

Like all of the children of Eris given by Hesiod, the Phonoi are a personified abstraction, allegorizing the meaning of their name, and representing one of the many harmful things which might be thought to result from discord and strife, with no other identity.

== Phonos ==
There are also a few examples, in ancient poetry, of Phonos (singular), as the personification of murder. The Hesiodic poem Shield of Heracles (lines 144–319) describes the many dozens of things depicted on Heracles' elaborately decorated shield. In one section of this long description, Phonos is mentioned along with other personifications associated with battle:

Upon it were wrought Pursuit [Proioxis] and Rally [Palioxis]; upon it burned Tumult [Homados] and Murder [Phonos] and Slaughter [Androktasia]; upon it was Strife [Eris], upon it rushed Battle-Din [Kydoimos], upon it deadly Fate [Ker] was dragging men by the feet through the battle, holding one who was alive but freshly wounded, another who was unwounded, another who had died. Around her [Fate's] shoulders she wore a cloak, purple with the blood of men, and she glared terribly and bellowed with a clanging sound.

Phonos is mentioned in Aeschylus's tragedy Seven Against Thebes. As one of several insults that Amphiaraus casts at Tydeus, Amphiaraus calls him "high priest" of Phonos. Personified murder seems also to be referred to in a line from Aeschylus' tragedy Libation-Bearers: "may the ancient murder [phonos] breed no more in the house." In the Posthomerica of Quintus Smyrnaeus, "dreadful" Phonos (along with Kydoimos) "stalked" the battle field.
