= Homados =

Greek mythological personification of battle-noise

In Greek mythology, Homados (Ancient Greek: Ὅμαδος, romanized: Hómados, lit. 'din of battle', ['ho.ma.dos]) was the personification of battle-noise—the shouts, cries, and confusion of men and the clashing of their weapons.

== Mythology ==
In the epic poem the Shield of Heracles, attributed to Hesiod, Homados was one of the many figures, depicted on Heracles' shield.

In his hands [Herakles] took his shield, all glittering: no one ever broke it with a blow or crushed it. And a wonder it was to see . . . In the centre was Fear (Phobos) worked in adamant, unspeakable, staring backwards with eyes that glowed with fire. His mouth was full of teeth in a white row, fearful and daunting, and upon his grim brow hovered frightful Strife (Eris) who arrays the throng of men: pitiless she, for she took away the mind and senses of poor wretches who made war against the son of Zeus . . . Upon the shield Pursuit (Proioxis) and Flight (Palioxis) were wrought, and Tumult (Homados), and Panic (Phobos), and Slaughter (Androktasia). Strife (Eris) also, and Uproar (Kydoimos) were hurrying about, and deadly Fate (Ker) was there holding one man newly wounded, and another unwounded; and one, who was dead, she was dragging by the feet through the tumult.

== See also ==
- Alala
- Alke
- Ioke
- Polemus
