= Oizys =

Goddess of misery in Greek mythology

In Greek mythology, Oizys (/ˈoʊɪzɪs/; Ancient Greek: Ὀϊζύς, romanized: Oïzús, lit. 'misery'), or Oezys (Οἰζύς), is the personification of pain or distress. In Hesiod's Theogony, Oizys is one of the offspring of Nyx (Night), produced without the assistance of a father. Oizys has no distinct mythology of her own.

According to the Roman authors Cicero and Hyginus, "Miseria" (Misery) is one of the offspring of the Nox (Night, the Roman equivalent of Nyx) and Erebus.

== See also ==
- Achlys
- Hybris (mythology)
- Ponos
- Algos
