= Achlys =

Ancient Greek goddess

Achlys /ˈæklɪs/ (Ancient Greek: Ἀχλύς "mist"), in the Hesiodic Shield of Heracles, is one of the figures depicted on Heracles' shield, perhaps representing the personification of sorrow. In Homer, achlys is the mist which fogs or blinds mortal eyes (often in death). Her Roman counterpart Caligo was said to have been the mother of Chaos. In Nonnus's Dionysiaca, she seems to be a witch.

== Sources ==
=== Homer ===
In Homer, the word achlys (ἀχλύς, 'mist'), is frequently used to describe a mist that is "shed" upon a mortal's eyes, often while dying. For example in the Iliad, the hero Sarpedon while grievously wounded:

his spirit failed him, and down over his eyes a mist [ἀχλύς] was shed. Howbeit he revived, and the breath of the North Wind as it blew upon him made him to live again after in grievous wise he had breathed forth his spirit.

While in the Odyssey, Eurymachus, one of the suitors of Penelope, hit in the chest by an arrow from Odysseus:

let the sword fall from his hand to the ground, and writhing over the table he bowed and fell, and spilt upon the floor the food and the two-handled cup. With his brow he beat the earth in agony of soul, and with both his feet he spurned and shook the chair, and a mist [ἀχλύς] was shed over his eyes.

=== Shield of Heracles ===
In the Shield of Heracles, an archaic Greek epic poem (early sixth century BC?), that was attributed to Hesiod, Achlys is one of the figures described as being depicted on Heracles' shield, where she is understood as being the personification of sorrow or grief:

Beside them [Clotho, Lachesis, and Atropos (the Moirai), and the Keres] stood Death-Mist [Ἀχλὺς], gloomy and dread, pallid, parched, cowering in hunger, thick-kneed; long claws were under her hands. From her nostrils flowed mucus, from her cheeks blood was dripping down onto the ground. She stood there, grinning dreadfully, and much dust, wet with tears, lay upon her shoulders.

=== Fabulae ===
The Roman counterpart to Achlys seems to have been Caligo ('dark fog'). The first-century BC Roman mythographer Hyginus, in the Preface of his Fabulae, has Caligo being the mother of Chaos (for Hesiod the first being who existed), and, with Chaos, was the mother of Night (Nox), Day (Dies), Darkness (Erebus) and Ether (Aether), possibly drawing on an otherwise unknown Greek cosmological myth.

=== Dionysiaca ===
Nonnus, in his Dionysiaca (c. 5th century AD), seems to regard Achlys as a kind of witch. According to Nonnus, Hera—angry with the guardians of the infant Dionysus (the sons of the Naiad nurses of Dionysus)—"procured from Thessalian Achlys [Ἀχλύος] treacherous flowers of the field", which she used to sprinkle a sleeping charm over their heads, then "she distilled poisoned drugs over their hair and smeared a magical ointment over their faces", changing their human shape into that of horned Centaurs.
