= Alala =

Personification of the war cry in Greek mythology

Alala /ˈælələ/ (Ancient Greek: Ἀλαλά (alalá); "battle-cry" or "war-cry") was the personification of the war cry in Greek mythology. Her name derives from the onomatopoeic Greek word ἀλαλή (alalḗ), hence the verb ἀλαλάζω (alalázō), "to raise the war-cry". Greek soldiers attacked the enemy with this cry in order to cause panic in their lines and it was asserted that Athenians adopted it to emulate the cry of the owl, the bird of their patron goddess Athena.

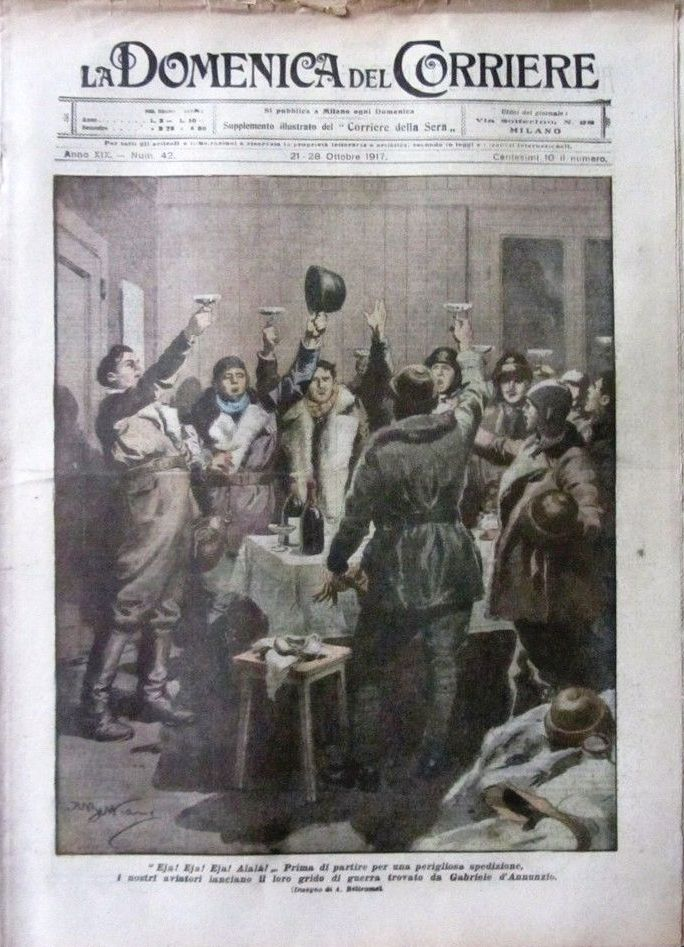
Italian aviators shout the war-cry in October 1917

According to Pindar, Alala was the daughter of Polemos, the personification of war, and was characterised by the poet as "prelude to spears, to whom men offer a holy sacrifice of death on behalf of their city". A poetic epithet of the war god Ares is Alaláxios (Ἀλαλάξιος). Alala is one of the attendants of Ares out on the battlefield, along with the rest of his entourage: Phobos and Deimos (his sons); Eris/Discordia, with the Androktasiai, Makhai, Hysminai, and the Phonoi (Eris' children); the Spartoi, and the Keres.

In Italy the war-cry (modified as Eja Eja Alalà) /e.jɑ e.jɑ ɑ.lɑ.'lɑ/ was invented by Gabriele D'Annunzio in August 1917, using the Greek cry preceded by a Sardinian shout, in place of what he considered the barbaric 'Hip! Hip! Hurrah!'. It was used by the aviation corps soon afterwards before setting out on a dangerous flight during World War I. In 1919 it was associated with the corps that captured Fiume and was then adopted by the Fascist movement. Later a young Polish sympathiser, Artur Maria Swinarski (1900–65), used the cry as the title of a collection of his poems in 1926.

== See also ==
- Battle cry
- Ululation
