= Ioke =

Ioke /iːˈoʊkeɪ/ is the Hawaiian language equivalent for the name Joyce (name). It may also refer to:

- Hurricane Ioke (2006)
- Ioke (programming language)
- Ioke (mythology), personification of pursuit in Greek mythology
