= Logoi =

Logoi may refer to:

- logoi, plural of the ancient Greek word logos, meaning 'word, discourse, or reason'.
- Logoi, one of the children of Eris, the Greek goddess of strife
