= Lethe (daughter of Eris) =

Figure in Greek mythology

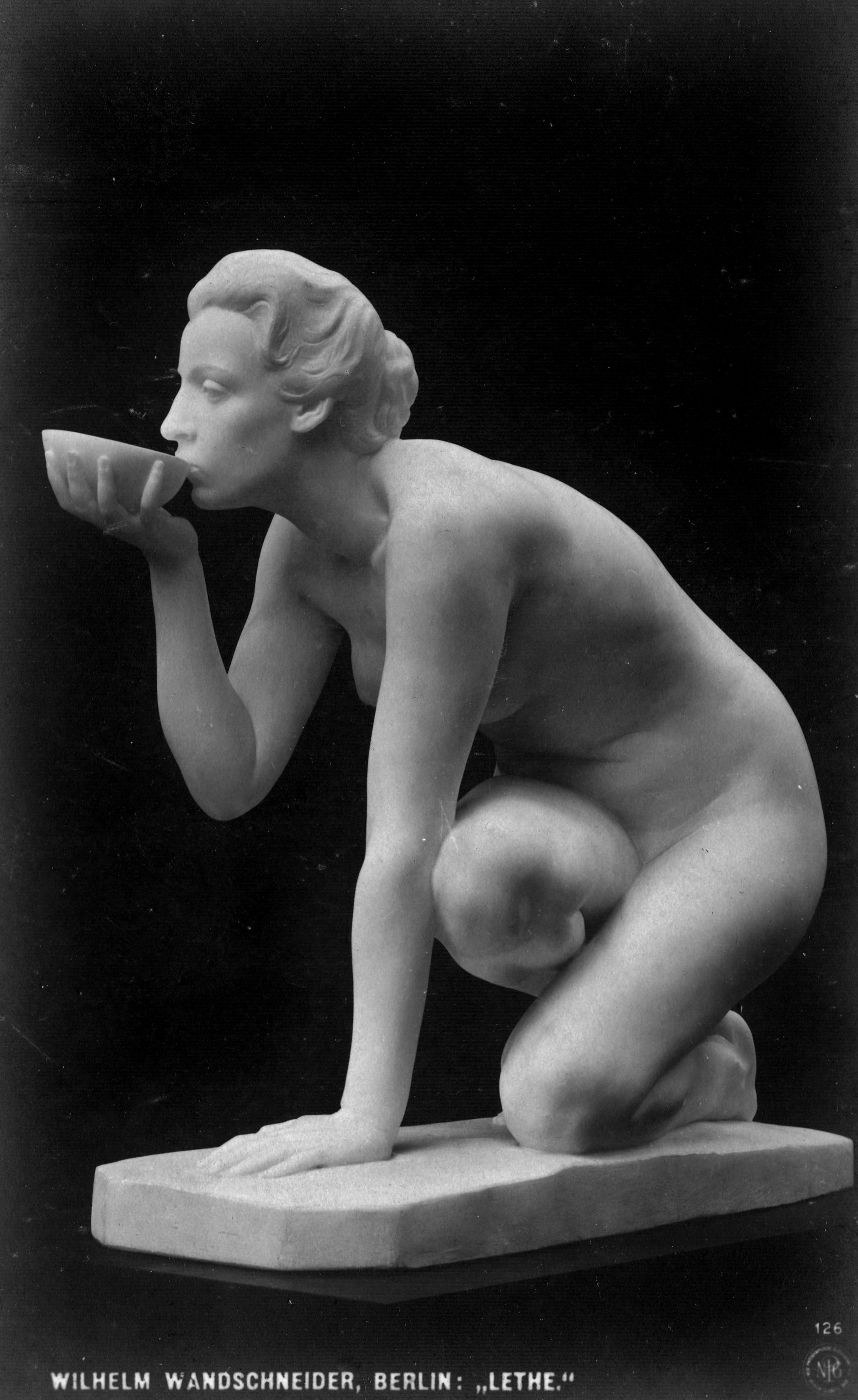
"Lethe", statue by Wilhelm Wandschneider

In Greek mythology, Lethe (Ancient Greek: Λήθη, lit. 'Forgetfulness, Oblivion') is the personification of forgetfulness and oblivion. According to Hesiod's Theogony, Lethe was the daughter of Eris (Strife), with no father mentioned. Her name was also given to Lethe, the river of oblivion in the Underworld.

Like all of the children of Eris, as given by Hesiod, Lethe is a personified abstraction, allegorizing the meaning of her name, and representing one of the many harmful things which might be thought to result from discord and strife, with no other identity. The Roman mythographer Hyginus has the equivalent personification of the meaning of the Latin word oblivio (oblivion, forgetfulness) as the offspring of Ether [Aether] and Earth [Terra].

The meaning of the Greek lethe may have been influenced by the Greek word aletheia, meaning truth.

== Literary sources ==
A fragment from one of the plays of Sophocles describes Lethe as "dumb, speechless", and "deprived of all things". Lethe became associated with the personifications Death (Thanatos) and Sleep (Hypnos). For example, the Orphic Hymn to Sleep, has Sleep being a "true brother" to Death and Oblivion [Lethe], while the Roman poet Statius has the Latin equivalent Oblivio [Forgetfulness] as one of the guards at the entrance to the halls of Sleep.

In Hellenistic literature, Lethe became a counterpart of Mneme [Μνήμη] the personification of memory, who was more or less identical to the Titan Mnemosyne. For example, The Greek Anthology (10.67) has:

Memory [Μνήμη] and Oblivion, [Λήθη] all hail! Memory I say in the case of good things, and Oblivion in the case of evil.

Mnemosyne played an important role in Orphic eschatology, where it was her "work" to remind the soul of the initiate what must be done in the Underworld. In the Orphic Hymn to Mnemosyne, the goddess is invoked to combat oblivion (lethe). Mnemosyne is contrasted with "evil oblivion (lethe) that harms the mind", and called upon to "stir" in the minds of the initiates "the memory of the sacred rite", and to "ward off oblivion from them". Lethe and Mnemosyne were also paired at the oracle of Trophonios at Livadeia. The geographer Pausanias, tells us that, before consulting the oracle, one had to drink from the fountain of Lethe to clear one's mind, and afterwards drink from the fountain of Mnemosyne to remember what the oracle says.

Lethe, as a daughter of Eris, had a negative connotation, which can be seen from her association with Death and as the "evil" counterpart of Mneme/Mnemosyne. However Lethe's association with Sleep might perhaps also imply a positive aspect, similar to that of Sleep who is said to "free us of cares" and "offer sweet respite from toil".

One of the sepulchral epigrams from the seventh book of The Greek Anthology, apparently an inscription from the "tomb of Teos", mentions a "Lethe". The epigram has Teos as dwelling in the "House of Lethe" in the Underworld, possibly a reference to the daughter of Eris, and her residence there.
