= Limos =

Greek deity of famine and starvation

In Greek mythology, Limos (Ancient Greek: Λιμός, romanized: Līmós, lit. 'Famine, Hunger, Starvation') is the personification of famine or hunger. Of uncertain sex, Limos was, according to Hesiod's Theogony, the offspring of Eris (Strife), with no father mentioned. Like all of the children of Eris given by Hesiod, Limos is a personified abstraction allegorizing the meaning of the Greek word limos, and represents one of the many harmful things which might be thought to result from discord and strife, with no other identity.

Limos was held in particular regard at Sparta. The name of Fames, a figure in Roman mythology, is a translation of Limos.

== Sex ==
Ancient Greek is a gendered language, and the gender of the Greek word limos can be either masculine or feminine. The same gender uncertainty applied also to the personification, which could be considered as either a man or a woman. At Byzantium there was a statue of Limos as a man, while there was a painting of Limos as a woman at Sparta.

== Descriptions ==
In Hesiod's Works and Days, Limos is presented as the antithesis of Demeter (the goddess of grain). According to Hesiod, in contrast to Demeter, who loves the hard-working man, filling his "granary with the means of life", Limos hates him, and "is ever the companion of a man who does not work". The Greek Iambic poet Semonides (c. seventh century BC), describes Limos as "a hostile housemate, enemy of the gods". These archaic descriptions of Limos as a "companion" and "housemate" seemingly regard Limos as a being able to enter one's house and dwell there.

== At Sparta ==
Limos was one of seven abstractions respected, and possibly deified, at Sparta. The other six were Phobos (Fear), Aidos (Modesty or Reserve), Hypnos (Sleep), Thanatos (Death), Gelos (Laughter), and Eros (Love). These were all abstractions associated with physical states of the body, or psychological states with physical manifestations. Also at Sparta, there was a painting of Limos (as mentioned above) at the temple of Apollo "in the form of a woman" and described as "a woman pale, and emaciated, with her hands tied behind her."

== See Also ==
- Erysichthon of Thessaly – King of Greek mythology, a victim of Limos' by Demeter's command.
