= Ponos =

Deity

In Greek mythology, Ponos or Ponus (Ancient Greek: Πόνος, romanized: Pónos, lit. 'Toil, Labor, Hardship') is the personification of toil and stress. According to Hesiod's Theogony, "painful" Ponos was the son of Eris (Strife), with no father mentioned. Like all of the children of Eris given by Hesiod, Ponos is a personified abstraction, allegorizing the meaning of his name, and representing one of the many harmful things which might be thought to result from discord and strife, with no other identity.

Cicero has the equivalent personification of the meaning of the Latin word labor as the offspring of Erebus and Night (Erebo et Nocte). Although Ponos has a negative connotation in Hesiod, in a poem by Lucian (2nd century AD), he is seen as having the positive aspect of leading to a virtuous life.
