= Androktasiai =

Greek mythological figures

In Greek mythology, the Androktasiai (Ancient Greek: Ἀνδροκτασίαι ('Manslaughters', 'Manslayings', 'Slayings of Men'), from the plural of ἀνδροκτασία) are collectively the personification of the slaughter of men in battle. The Androktasiai are named in line 228 of Hesiod's Theogony, which lists four personified plural abstractions, the Hysminai (Battles), the Machai (Wars), the Phonoi (Murders), and the Androktasiai, as being among the several offspring of Eris (Strife):

Ὑσμίνας τε Μάχας τε Φόνους τ’ Ἀνδροκτασίας τε

The nearly identical line, listing the same four abstractions (without capitalizations, and with different case endings), in the same order, occurs in Homer's Odyssey, where Odysseus describes the decorations on Heracles' golden belt:

ὑσμῖναί τε μάχαι τε φόνοι τ᾿ ἀνδροκτασίαι τε.

Like all of the children of Eris given by Hesiod, the Phonoi are a personified abstraction, allegorizing the meaning of their name, and representing one of the many harmful things which might be thought to result from discord and strife, with no other identity.

The singular personification of manslaughter, Androktasia, also occurred in ancient poetry. The Hesiodic Shield of Heracles (lines 144–319) describes the many dozens of things depicted on Heracles' elaborately decorated shield. In one section of this long description, Androktasia is mentioned along with other personifications associated with battle:

Upon it were wrought Pursuit [Proioxis] and Rally [Palioxis]; upon it burned Tumult [Homados] and Murder Phonos and Slaughter [Androktasia]; upon it was Strife [Eris], upon it rushed Battle-Din [Kydoimos], upon it deadly Fate [Ker] was dragging men by the feet through the battle, holding one who was alive but freshly wounded, another who was unwounded, another who had died. Around her [Fate's] shoulders she wore a cloak, purple with the blood of men, and she glared terribly and bellowed with a clanging sound.
