= Discordia =

Roman goddess

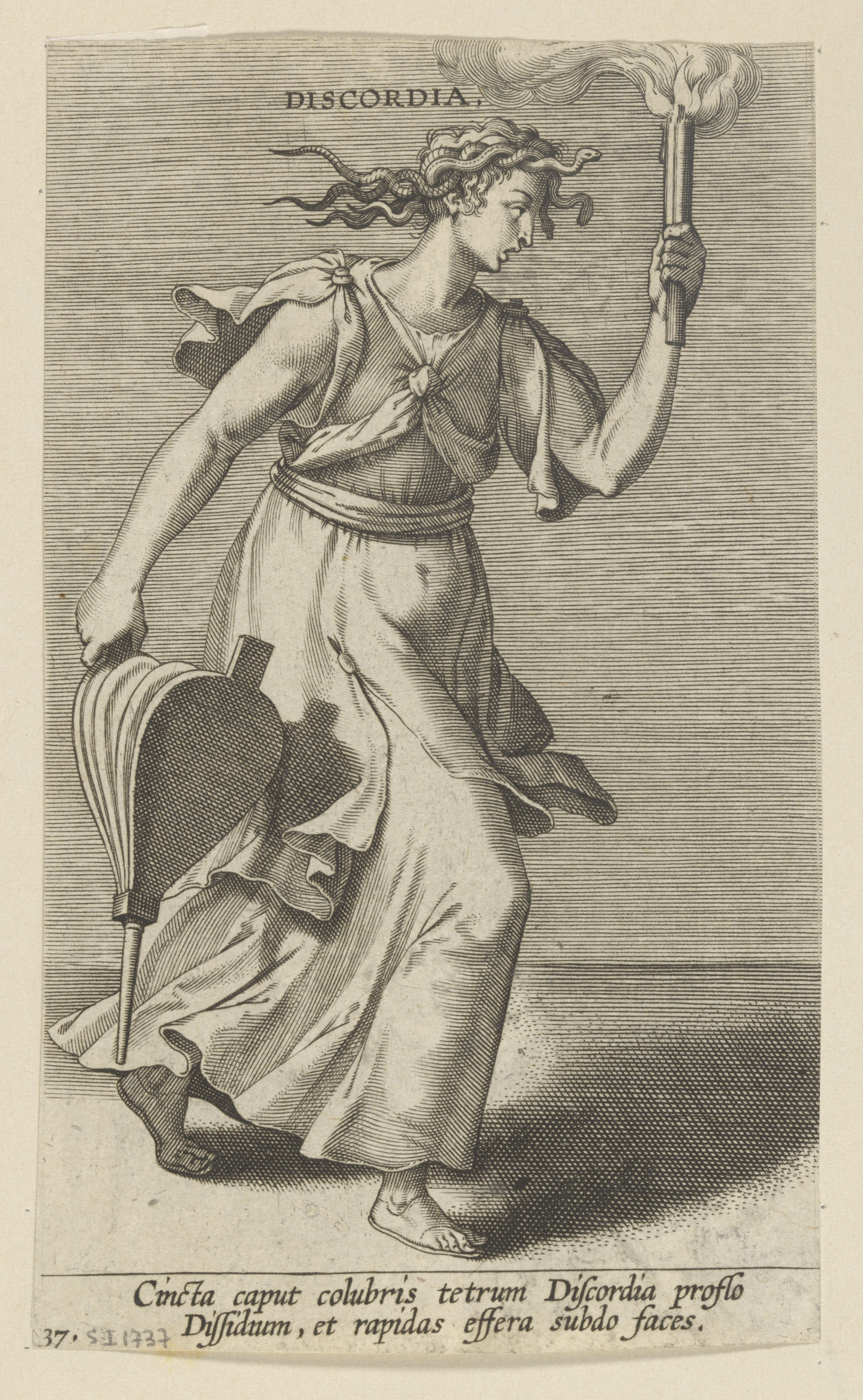
Print of Discordia made by Philip Galle

In Roman mythology, Discordia is the Roman equivalent of the Greek Eris, goddess of strife and discord. She was the daughter of Nox (Night) and Erebus. Like Eris, Discordia has no mythology other than her involvement in the Judgement of Paris.

Unlike her opposite Concordia, Discordia was not a cult goddess, but simply a literary personification, and like Eris was especially associated with the strife and discord in war. She was, in particular, associated with Roman civil war.

== Family ==
The Greek personification of strife and discord, Eris, according to Hesiod's Theogony, is the daughter of Nyx (Night) with no father. Similarly, according to the Fabulae, Discordia is the daughter of Nox (Night), although it gives her father as Erebus. The Fabulae lists many siblings of Discord, similar to but different from the list of siblings of Eris as given by Hesiod. For example, both are siblings of "Old Age" (the Greek Geras and Roman Senecus), "Death" (the Greek Thanatos and Roman Mors), the Fates (the Greek Moirai and Roman Parcae), and Nemesis ("Indignation"). However while the siblings of Eris are all negative personified abstractions, some of Discordia's are positive, such as Euphrosyne ("Cheerfulness"), and Amicitia ("Friendship"), while others are not personified abstractions at all, such as the Giant Porphyrion, or Styx, the goddess and river of the Underworld. Also unlike Eris, Discordia has no children.

== Judgement of Paris ==
The Roman story of Discordia's involvement in the Judgement of Paris, is essentially the same as that of Eris. As told in the Fabulae, the story is as follows. All the gods, except Discordia, were invited by Jupiter to the wedding of Peleus and Thetis. She came anyway and was refused admission, so she threw an apple through the doorway, saying that the most beautiful should take it. The three goddesses, Juno, Venus, and Minerva each claimed the apple. This started the quarrel which led to the Judgement of Paris, and ultimately to the outbreak of the Trojan War.

== Latin literature ==
Unlike her opposite, Concordia, Discordia was not a cult goddess, and was little more than a literary personification. As a personification of discord, she is a frequent occurrence in Latin epic poetry, and, and in particular, civil discord and civil war, through the first-century AD. In late antiquity Latin Christian literature, Discordia is contrasted with Concordia, with Discordia becoming a symbol of Christian discord and heresy.

=== Second century BC to first century AD ===
The Roman poet Ennius seems to have been the first to introduce "loathsome Discord" (Discordia taetra) when, in his second-century BC epic Annales, he describes Discordia as breaking open the "portals of War". Virgil, in the Aeneid (first century BC), has "maddening Strife (Discordia demens), her snaky locks entwined with bloody ribbons" as one of the many terrible evils who reside at the entrance to his Underworld.

Discordia was particularly associated with Roman internal conflict and civil war. Like the Homeric Eris in the Iliad, who is one of the divinities active in the Trojan War, Virgil makes Discordia one of the divine participants (as depicted on the prophetic Shield of Aeneas) at the Battle of Actium, during the Roman civil war between Octavian and Mark Antony. In a battle of gods, with "rent robe", Discordia "strides exultant":

Monstrous gods of every form and barking Anubis wield weapons against Neptune and Venus and against Minerva. In the middle of the fray storms Mavors, embossed in steel, with the grim Furies from on high; and in rent robe Discord [Discordia] strides exultant, while Bellona follows her with bloody scourge.

— Virgil, Aeneid 8.698–702; translation by H. Rushton Fairclough, revised by G. P. Goold

Discordia, under the influence of Virgil, appears in the works of the four later first-century AD Roman epic poets Lucan, Silius Italicus, Statius, and Valerius Flaccus. The word discordia (whether personified or not) appears seven times in Lucan's Pharsalia, his epic poem about the decisive battle in Caesar's civil war. Silius, in his epic Punica about the Second Punic War, begins his Battle of Cannae with Virgil's "maddening strife" (Discordia demens) invading heaven and forcing "the gods to fight". Statius involves Discordia (in the company of other personifications) in his Thebaid concerning the fraternal war, for the kingship of Thebes, between the two sons of Oedipus, Eteocles and Polynices. The Argonautica, Valerius' epic poem about Jason's search for the Golden Fleece, where the theme of civil discord is pervasive, also mentions the goddess. In Book 2, Discordia, among other personifications, hurries to assist Venus ("the Martian consort") to incite the women of Lemnos to make (civil) war on their husbands:

Straightway Fear and insensate Strife [Discordia] from her Getic lair, dark-browed Anger with pale cheeks, Treachery, Frenzy and towering above the rest Death, her cruel hands bared, come hastening up at the first sound of the Martian consort's pealing voice that gave the signal.

— Valerius Flaccus, Argonautica 2.204; translation by J. H. Mozley

Later in Book 6, Valerius, describing the crashing chariots of the warring Colchian brothers Aeetes and Perses, has: "the curved blades doth discord [discordia] entangle and lacerate the panic-stricken cars", then goes on to liken the battle between the two brothers to Roman civil war. While preparing Jason for his encounter with the Colchis Bulls, Medea handing him his helm says: "take again this crested helm which Discord [Discordia] held but now in her death-bringing hand".

Discordia is also mentioned in non-epic poetry, also often associated with Roman civil war. She makes an appearance in a civil war parody in Petronius's Satyricon (late first century AD), where she is described as follows:

Discord [Discordia] with disheveled hair raised her Stygian head up toward the gods of heaven. On her face blood had clotted, tears ran from her bruised eyes, her teeth covered in rusty scales were eaten away, her tongue was dripping with decaying matter, her face beset with snakes, beneath her torn clothes her breasts writhed, and in her bloody hand she waved a quivering torch.

— Petronius, Satyricon 124.271–277; translation by Gareth Schmeling

Urging all to war—in particular several notable figures in Caesar's civil war: Julius Caesar, Pompey the Great, Marcellus, Curio, Lentulus—Discordia:

spewed forth these words from her maddened breast: ‘All nations, take up arms now and fill your hearts with fire, take up arms, and hurl torches into the hearts of cities. Whoever hides from the fray will be lost; let no woman delay, no child, no man wasted by old age; let the earth itself quake and the shattered houses join the fight. You, Marcellus, uphold the law. You, Curio, stir up the rabble crowds. You, Lentulus, do not slow down the god of war. You, divine Caesar, why are you a laggard in your arms, why do you not break down the gates, why do you not strip the towns of their walls, and seize their treasures? You, Pompey the Great, do you not know how to defend Rome's citadels? So, seek out the alien walls of Epidamnus, and stain red the bays of Thessaly with human blood.’ All was done on earth, just as Discord ordered it.

— Petronius, Satyricon 124.282–295; translation by Gareth Schmeling

=== Early fifth century ===
Discordia's opposite, Concordia ("Concord"), the Roman equivalent of the Greek Harmonia ("Harmony"), was a Roman goddess who had a temple (the Temple of Concord) dedicated to her in the Roman Forum. The opposition between concordia (concord) and discordia (discord), and their personifications Concordia and Discordia—a dichotomy made use of by Virgil in the Aeneid—becomes, for late antiquity Latin poets, "something of an obsession".

Augustine, in his City of God (426 AD)—responding to the accusation that the 410 AD Sack of Rome was the result of Christianity and the failure to appease the pagan gods—argues that Rome's pre-Christian history, which was rife with civil discord and civil war, might just as well be said to have been the result of Rome's failure to appease Discordia. He notes that, following the dedication of the Temple of Concord in Rome, there was even worse civil discord, and remarks sarcastically that it would have been more appropriate for Rome to have built instead a "temple to Discord". He goes on to ask "why Concord should be a goddess, but Discord not", and—in what he describes as having "our fun with such inanities"— concludes that:

Thus the Romans to their peril chose to live under the menace of so evil a goddess unplacated, and never reflected that the tale of Troy and its destruction begins with the resentment of Discord. You know, of course, that when she was not invited with the other gods, she contrived to set three goddesses disputing by placing before them the golden apple. Hence the quarrel of the deities, the victory of Venus, the kidnapping of Helen and the destruction of Troy. It follows that if she was perhaps offended because she of all the gods had obtained no temple in the city, and was therefore already upsetting the state with such great tumults, she may well have been far more fiercely aroused when she saw erected a temple to her adversary on the spot where that slaughter—the spot where her handiwork, that is—had taken place!

— Augustine, City of God 3.25; translation by George E. McCracken

The opposition of Concordia and Discordia is particularly explicit in the Christian poet Prudentius's early fifth-century allegory Psychomachia ("Battle of the Soul"), in which armies of personified Virtues and Vices do battle. Here the Vice Discordia becomes explicitly identified with religious heresy. After the army of Vices had been defeated, Discordia, in disguise, entered the camp of the celebrating Virtues, seeking to attack surreptitiously the "greatest" of the Virtues Concordia:

wearing the counterfeit shape of a friend. Her torn mantle and her whip of many snakes were left lying far behind amid the heaps of dead on the field of battle, while she herself, displaying her hair wreathed with leafy olive, answered cheerfully the joyous revellers. But she has a dagger hidden under her raiment, seeking to attack thee, thou greatest of Virtues, thee alone, Concord, of all this number, with bitter treachery.

— Prudentius, Psychomachia 684–691; translation by H. J. Thomson

But Discordia is discovered, and with the army of Virtues, swords drawn, surrounding her and demanding to know "her race and name, her country and her faith, what God she worships, of what nation he that sent her", she answers:

I am called Discord, and my other name is Heresy. The God I have is variable, now lesser, now greater, now double, now single; when I please, he is unsubstantial, a mere apparition, or again the soul within us, when I choose to make a mock of his divinity. My teacher is Belial, my home and country the world.

— Prudentius, Psychomachia 709–714; translation by H. J. Thomson

At which point Faith, the Virtues' queen, unwilling to hear any more of their "outrageous prisoner's blasphemies", stopped Discordia's speech by driving a javelin through her tongue, and:

Countless hands tear the deadly beast in pieces, each seizing bits to scatter to the breezes, or throw to the dogs, or proffer to the devouring carrion crows, or thrust into the foul, stinking sewers, or give to the sea-monsters for their own. The whole corpse is torn asunder and parcelled out to unclean creatures; so perishes frightful Heresy, rent limb from limb.

— Prudentius, Psychomachia 719–725; translation by H. J. Thomson

Martianus Capella (fl. c. 410–420), has Discordia, along with Seditio (Sedition) as being a deity of the third celestial region.

== Modern culture ==
Discordia/Eris is an important figure within the new religious movement Discordianism.

== See also ==
- Illa de la Discòrdia
