= Polemos =

Daemon in Greek mythology, a divine personification or embodiment of war

In Greek mythology, Polemos /ˈpɒlɪˌmɒs/ or Polemus /ˈpɒlɪməs/ (Ancient Greek: Πόλεμος Pólemos; "war") was a daemon; a divine personification or embodiment of war. No cult practices or myths are known for him, and as an abstract representation he figures mainly in allegory and philosophical discourse. The Roman counterpart of this figure was Bellum.

== Literature ==
Pindar says that Polemos is the father of Alala, goddess of the war-cry. According to Quintus Smyrnaeus, Polemos was the brother of the war goddess Enyo. Other Greek personifications of war and the battlefield include Ares, Eris, the Makhai, the Hysminai, the Androktasiai, the Phonoi and the Keres. In Aesop's fable of "War and his Bride", told by Babrius and numbered 367 in the Perry Index, it is related how Polemos drew Hubris (insolent arrogance) as his wife in a marriage lottery. So fond has he become of her that the two are now inseparable. Therefore, Babrius warns, "Let not Insolence ever come among the nations or cities of men, finding favour with the crowd; for after her straightway War will be at hand".

In Aristophanes' Acharnians, it is reported that Polemos is banned from parties for burning vineyards, emptying the wine and disrupting the singing. He is set in opposition to Dicaeopolis, who profitably champions peace and longs for marriage with Diallage, "Reconciliation". Dionysos, god of the life force, uses a vine stake as a weapon to wound the soldier Lamachus for neglecting him in favor of Polemos, but overall Aristophanes seem to be advocating a balance between Dionysos and Polemos, since the interests of the polis are served at times by peace and other times by war.

Polemos even makes a brief speaking appearance at the end of the prologue to Aristophanes' Peace. With Tumult (Kudoimos) as his henchman, he has buried Peace under stones in a cave. Now he makes a speech in which he announces that he is going to grind all the cities of Greece in a mortar, having plagued them for ten years. However, a series of puns on the names of the cities undermines his fearsome threat, making it appear as if he is preparing a relish for a feast. Sending Tumult to obtain a pestle sufficient for the task, he withdraws to the "house of Zeus" and does not reappear, though his potential return is a threat throughout the play. The scenario seems to be an original invention of Aristophanes.

== Philosophy ==
The pre-Socratic philosopher Heraclitus described Polemos as "both the king and father of all", with the capacity to bring all into existence and to annihilate. For Heraclitus, Polemos "reveals the gods on the one hand and humans on the other, makes slaves on the one hand, the free on the other". The fragment leaves it unclear as to whether Heraclitus thought of Polemos as an abstraction, a god, or a generalization of war, and this ambiguity is perhaps intentional. Heidegger interpreted the polemos of Heraclitus as the principle of differentiation or "setting apart" (German Auseinandersetzung).
