= Fames =

Roman personification/deity of hunger

In Roman mythology, Fames is the personification of hunger, who can arouse an insatiable appetite. She was often said to be one of the several evils who inhabit the entrance to the Underworld. In Ovid's Metamorphoses, she lives in Scythia, a desolate place where she scrabbles unceasingly for the scant vegetation there, and at Ceres' command, she punishes Erysichthon with a never-ending hunger. Servius calls Fames the greatest of the Furies. She is the equivalent of the Greek Limos.

== Sources ==
=== Plautus ===
In Stichus (200 BC), a comedy by the Roman playwright Plautus, the ever-hungry Gelasimus, in the role of the parasite, one of the stock characters in Roman comedy, describes Fames as his mother:

I suspect that Hunger was my mother: from the time that I was born I’ve never been full. And no one will repay his mother better ... or has repaid her better than I repay my mother, Hunger: she carried me in her belly for ten [lunar] months, whereas I have been carrying her in my belly for over ten years. ... Every day I get pangs in my stomach, but I can’t give birth to my mother and I don’t know what to do.

=== Virgil, Seneca, and Claudian ===
The Latin poets Virgil, Seneca the Younger, and Claudian all list Hunger as among the many evils said to dwell in the Underworld. Describing the approach to the Underworld, Virgil, in his Aeneid, says:

there pale Diseases dwell, sad Age, and Fear, and Hunger, temptress to sin, and loathly Want, shapes terrible to view.

Seneca, in his Hercules, says that next to the Underworld river Cocytus lies:

sad Hunger with wasted jaws, and Shame, too late, covers its guilty face. There are Fear and Panic, Death and gnashing Resentment; behind them black Grief, trembling Disease and steel-girt War; hidden at the back, feeble Old Age.

While Claudian lists among "Hell's numberless monsters ... Discord, mother of war, imperious Hunger, Age, near neighbour to Death" and several others.

=== Ovid ===
Ovid, in his Metamorphoses, tells the story of the Thessalian king Erysichthon and his grim fate at the hands of Fames. When Erysichthon cut down a grove of trees sacred to Ceres, the goddess of grain, looked to her antithesis Fames to deliver her punishment: "Let pestilent Hunger torture his body!"

In Ovid's account, Fames lives at the farthest edge of Scythia, a frozen, gloomy wasteland, high in the Caucasus Mountains, where little grows. But, Ceres and Hunger being opposites, the Fates never let the two meet. So, in her stead, Ceres sent an oread nymph to seek out Fames:

"Go to a place on the farthest borders of icy Scythia,
gloomy terrain, where the earth is barren of crops and of trees.
Sluggish Cold has its home in that land, with Pallor and trembling,
ravenous Hunger too. Tell Hunger to fasten herself
in the cursed maw of that impious man, and never to yield
to abundance of food. Let her vie with my nourishing power — and defeat it!"

So the nymph when to Scythia. There she found Fames ceaselessly grubbing ("nail and tooth") in the ground for whatever little bit of vegetation she could find. She was starving and emaciated:

Her hair was tangles, her eyes like hollows, complextion pallid,
her lips grimy and grey, her throat scabrous and scurfy.
Her skin was so hard and fleshless, the entrails were visible through it;
her shrunken bones protruded under her sagging loins;
her belly was merely an empty space; her pendulous breasts
appeared to be strung on nothing except the cage of her backbone;
her leanness had swollen all her joints; the rounds of her knees
were bulbous; her ankles were grossly enlarged to a puffy excrescence.

Fames did as Ceres had commanded. She entered Erysichthon's chamber:

It was night and she found him buried in sleep. Then twining her arms
around him, she poured herself deep inside as she breathed on his throat,
on his breast, on his mouth, and dispersed starvation throughout his veins.

Thereafter, Erysichthon is filled with a never ending hunger. He sells all his possessions, including his daughter as a slave, in a futile attempt to satisfy his insatiable appetite. He is ultimately driven to eat his own body.
