= Rudianos =

Celtic and Roman god

In ancient Celtic religion, Rudianos was a war god worshiped in Gaul. In Roman times he was connected with Mars.

== Name ==
He was invoked at Saint-Andéol-en-Quint and Rochefort-Samson (Drôme), and at Saint-Michel-de-Maurienne. The name "Rudianos" means 'red', reflecting the warlike nature of the god. At Saint-Michel-de-Valbonne there was also found a prehistoric image of a mounted war-god, dating to the 6th Century BC, who could perhaps be Rudianos himself. The menhir-shaped stone depicts a roughly incised figure of a horseman, with an enormous head, riding down five severed heads. The iconography is evocative of the head-hunting exploits of the Celts, who hung the heads of their battle victims from their saddles, according to classical writers.
