= Eris (mythology) =

Greek goddess of strife and discord

- Goddess of strife and discord
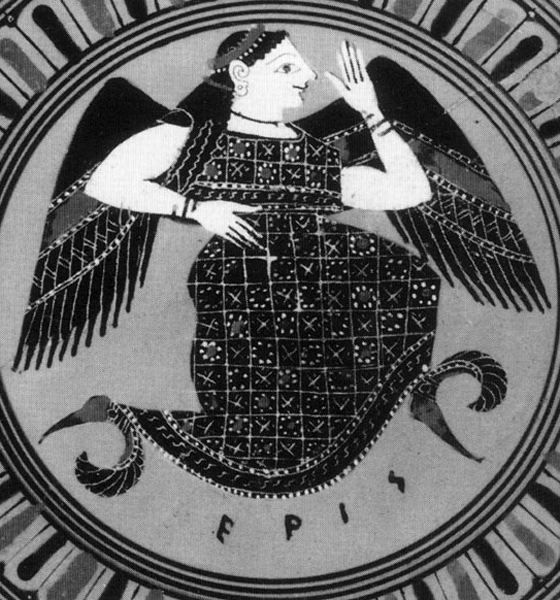
- Winged Eris on an Attic black-figure cup, c. 550–540 BC, Antikensammlung Berlin

Genealogy
- Parents: Nyx
- Children: Ponos, Lethe, Limos, Algea, Hysminai, Machai, Phonoi, Androktasiai, Neikea, Pseudea, Logoi, Amphilogiai, Dysnomia, Ate, Horkos

Equivalents
- Roman: Discordia

In Greek mythology, Eris (Ancient Greek: Ἔρις, romanized: Eris, lit. 'Strife') is the goddess and personification of strife and discord, particularly in war, and in the Iliad (where she is the "sister" of Ares the god of war). According to Hesiod she was the daughter of primordial Nyx (Night), and the mother of a long list of undesirable personified abstractions, such as Ponos (Toil), Limos (Famine), Algea (Pains) and Ate (Delusion). Eris initiated a quarrel between Hera, Athena and Aphrodite, which led to the Judgement of Paris and ultimately the Trojan War. Eris's Roman equivalent is Discordia. According to Hesiod, there was another Eris, separate and distinct from Eris the daughter of Nyx, who was beneficial to men.

== Etymology ==
The name derives from the noun eris, with stem erid-, which means "strife, discord" and is of uncertain etymology; connections with the verb ὀρίνειν orínein "to raise, stir, excite" and the proper name Ἐρινύες Erinyes have been suggested. R. S. P. Beekes sees no strong evidence for this relation and excludes the derivation from ἐρείδω ereídō "to prop, to support" due to the name's original ι- stem. Watkins suggested origin from a Proto-Indo-European root ere- meaning "to separate, to adjoin". The name gave several derivatives in Ancient Greek, including ἐρίζω erízō "to fight" and ἔρισμα érisma "object of a quarrel".

== Family ==
In Homer's Iliad, Eris is described as the "sister and comrade" of Ares, though according to Geoffrey Kirk she is "not fully personified" here, and this genealogy is a "purely ad hoc description". Some scholars interpret this passage as indicating she is the daughter of Zeus and Hera, Ares' parents. However, according to Hesiod's Theogony, Eris is the daughter of Nyx (Night), being among the many children Nyx produced without a partner. These siblings of Eris include personifications—like Eris—of several "loathsome" (στυγερός [stugerós]) things, such as Moros ("Doom"), Thanatos ("Death"), the Moirai ("Fates"), Nemesis ("Indignation"), Apate ("Deceit"), and Geras ("Old Age").

Like her mother Nyx, Hesiod has Eris as the mother—with no father mentioned—of many children (the only child of Nyx with offspring) who are also personifications representing various misfortunes and harmful things which, in Eris' case, might be thought to result from discord and strife. All of Eris' children are little more than allegorizations of the meanings of their names, with virtually no other identity. The following table lists the children of Eris, as given by Hesiod:

Children
Name	Ancient Greek		Common translations	Remarks
Name	prop. n.	com. n. sg.	Common translations	Remarks
Ponos	Πόνος	πόνος	Toil, Labor, Hardship	Called by Hesiod "painful Ponos" (Πόνον ἀλγινόεντα). Cicero has the equivalent personification of the Latin word labor as the offspring of Erebus and Night (Erebo et Nocte).
Lethe	Λήθη	λήθη	Forgetfulness, Oblivion	Associated with Lethe, the river of oblivion in the Underworld.
Limos	Λιμός	λιμός	Famine, Hunger, Starvation	Of uncertain sex; held in special regard at Sparta; the equivalent of the Roman Fames.
Algea	Ἄλγεα (pl.)	ἄλγος	Pains, Sorrows	Called by Hesiod the "tearful Algae" (Ἄλγεα δακρυόεντα). Not notably personified elsewhere.
Hysminai	Ὑσμῖναι (pl.)	ὑσμίνη	Combats, Fights, Battles	The Posthomerica of Quintus Smyrnaeus has an image of the Hysminai decorating Achilles's shield.
Machai	Μάχαι (pl.)	μάχη	Battles, Wars	Not notably personified elsewhere
Phonoi	Φόνοι (pl.)	φόνος	Murders, Slaughterings	The Shield of Heracles, has an image of Phonos (singular) decorating Heracle's shield.
Androktasiai	Ἀνδροκτασίαι (pl.)	ἀνδροκτασία	Manslaughters, Manslayings, Slayings of Men	The Shield of Heracles, has an image of Androktasia (singular) decorating Heracle's shield.
Neikea	Νείκεα (pl.)	νεῖκος	Quarrels	Not notably personified elsewhere.
Pseudea	Ψεύδεα (pl.)	ψεῦδος	Lies, Falsehoods	Not notably personified elsewhere.
Logoi	Λόγοι (pl.)	λόγος	Tales, Stories, Words	Not notably personified elsewhere.
Amphillogiai	Ἀμφιλλογίαι (pl.)	ἀμφιλογία	Disputes, Unclear Words	Not notably personified elsewhere.
Dysnomia	Δυσνομία	δυσνομία	Lawlessness, Bad Government, Anarchy	The Athenian statesman Solon contrasted Dysnomia with Eunomia, the personification of the ideal government:
Ate	Ἄτη	ἄτη	Delusion, Recklessness, Folly, Ruin	She was banished from Olympus by Zeus for blinding him to Hera's trickery denying Heracles his birthright.
Horkos	Ὅρκος	ὅρκος	Oath	The curse that is inflicted on any person who swears a false oath.

== Judgement of Paris ==
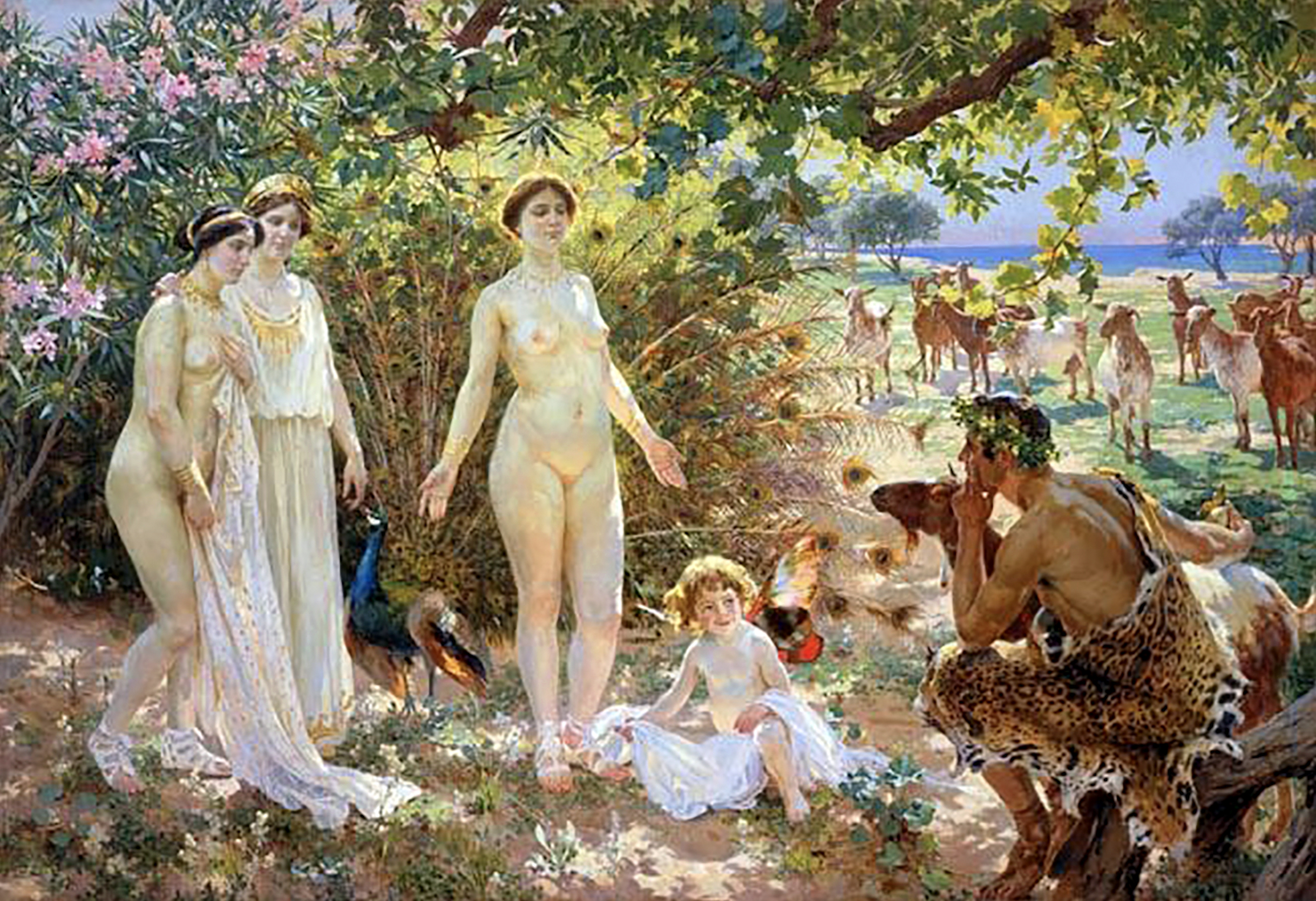
El Juicio de Paris by Enrique Simonet, 1904

Eris plays a crucial role in one important myth. She was the initiator of the quarrel between the three Greek goddesses, Hera, Athena, and Aphrodite, resolved by the Judgement of Paris, which led to Paris' abduction of Helen of Troy and the outbreak of the Trojan War. As the story came to be told, all the gods were invited to the wedding of Peleus and Thetis except Eris. She came anyway, but was refused admission. In anger, she threw a golden apple among the wedding guests inscribed with "For the fairest", which the three goddesses each claimed.

Homer alludes to the Judgement of Paris, but with no mention of Eris. An account of the story was told in the Cypria, one of the poems in the Epic Cycle, which told the entire story of the Trojan War. The Cypria, which is the first poem in the Cycle, describes events preceding those that occur in the Iliad, the second poem in the Cycle. According to a prose summary of the now lost Cypria, Eris, acting according to the plans of Zeus and Themis to bring about the Trojan War, instigates a nekios ('feud') between the three goddesses over "beauty" (presumably over who of the three was the most beautiful), while they were attending the wedding feast of Peleus and Thetis (who would become the parents of Achilles). To settle the dispute, Zeus orders the three goddesses to go to Mount Ida to be judged by Paris. Paris, having been offered Helen by Aphrodite in return for Paris choosing her, does so.

The fifth-century BC playwright Euripides describes the Judgement of Paris several times with no mention of either Eris or an apple. Later accounts include details, such as the golden Apple of Discord, which may or may not have come from the Cypria. According to the Fabulae of Hyginus, composed somewhere between the first century BC and the late second century AD, all the gods had been invited to the wedding except Eris. Nevertheless, she came to the wedding feast, and when refused entrance, she threw an apple through the doorway, saying that it was for the "fairest", which started the quarrel. The satirist Lucian (fl. 2nd century AD) tells us that Eris's apple was "solid gold" and that it was inscribed: "For the queen of Beauty" (ἡ καλὴ λαβέτω).

== Strife in war ==
Eris personifies strife, particularly the strife associated with war. In Homer's Iliad, Eris is described as being depicted on both Athena's battle aegis, and Achilles' shield, where she appears alongside other war-related personifications: Phobos ("Rout"), Alke ("Valor"), and Ioke ("Assault"), on the aegis, and Kydoimos ("Tumult"), and Ker ("Fate"), on the shield. Similarly, the Hesiodic Shield of Heracles has Eris depicted on Heracles' shield, also with Phobos, Kydoimos and Ker, as well as other war-related personifications: Proioxis ("Pursuit"), Palioxis ("Rally"), Homados ("Tumult "), Phonos ("Murder"), and Androktasia ("Slaughter"). Here Eris is described as flying over the head of Phobos ("Fear"):

In the middle was Fear, made of adamant, unspeakable, glaring backward with eyes shining like fire. His mouth was full of white teeth, terrible, dreadful; and over his grim forehead flew terrible Strife, preparing for the battle-rout of men—cruel one, she took away the mind and sense of any men who waged open war against Zeus’ son [Heracles].

— Hesiod, Shield of Heracles 144–150; translation by Glenn W. Most

Eris also appears in several battle scenes in the Iliad. However, unlike Apollo, Athena and several other of the Olympians, Eris does not participate in active combat, nor take sides in the war. Her role in the Iliad is that of "the rouser of armies", urging both armies to fight each other. In Book 4, she is one of the divinities (along with Ares, Athena, Deimos ("Terror"), and Phobos ("Rout") urging the armies to battle, with head lowered at first, but soon raised up to the heavens:

And the Trojans were urged on by Ares, and the Achaeans by flashing-eyed Athene, and Terror, and Rout, and Strife who rages incessantly, sister and comrade of man-slaying Ares; she first rears her crest only a little, but then her head is fixed in the heavens while her feet tread on earth. She it was who now cast evil strife into their midst as she went through the throng, making the groanings of men to increase.

— Homer, Iliad 4.439–445; translation by A. T. Murray, revised by William F. Wyatt

She also appears in this "rouser of armies" role in Book 5, and again in Book 11, where Zeus sends Eris to rouse the Greek army by shouting:

Zeus sent Strife to the swift ships of the Achaeans, gruesome Strife, holding in her hands a portent of war. And she stood by Odysseus’ black ship, huge of hull, that was in the middle so that a shout could reach to either end, both to the huts of Aias, son of Telamon, and to those of Achilles; for these had drawn up their shapely ships at the furthermost ends, trusting in their valor and the strength of their hands. There the goddess stood and uttered a great and terrible shout, a shrill cry of war, and in the heart of each man of the Achaeans she roused strength to war and to battle without ceasing. And to them at once war became sweeter than to return in their hollow ships to their dear native land.

— Homer, Iliad 11.3–14; translation by A. T. Murray, revised by William F. Wyatt

Her lust for bloodshed is insatiable. Later in Book 11, she is the last of the gods to leave the battlefield, rejoicing as she watches the fighting she has roused. While in Book 5, she is described as raging unceasingly.

Hesiod also associates Eris with war. In his Works and Days, he says that she "fosters evil war and conflict". And in his Theogony, has the Hysminai (Battles) and the Machai (Wars) as her children.

== Another Eris ==
In addition to the Eris who was the daughter of Nyx (Night), Hesiod, in his Works and Days, mentions another Eris. He contrasts the two: the former being "blameworthy" who "fosters evil war and conflict", the latter worthy of "praise", have been created by Zeus to foster beneficial competition:

So there was not just one birth of Strifes after all, but upon the earth there are two Strifes. One of these a man would praise once he got to know it, but the other is blameworthy; and they have thoroughly opposed spirits. For the one fosters evil war and conflict—cruel one, no mortal loves that one, but it is by necessity that they honor the oppressive Strife, by the plans of the immortals. But the other one gloomy Night bore first; and Cronus’ high-throned son, who dwells in the aether, set it in the roots of the earth, and it is much better for men. It rouses even the helpless man to work. For a man who is not working but who looks at some other man, a rich one who is hastening to plow and plant and set his house in order, he envies him, one neighbor envying his neighbor who is hastening toward wealth: and this Strife is good for mortals.

— Hesiod, Works and Days 11–24; translation by Glenn W. Most

== Other mentions ==
Antoninus Liberalis, in his Metamorphoses, involves Eris in the story of Polytechnus and Aëdon, who claimed to love each other more than Hera and Zeus. This angered Hera, so she sent Eris to wreak discord upon them. Eris is mentioned many times in Quintus Smyrnaeus' Posthomerica, which covers the period between the end of the Iliad and the beginning of his Odyssey. Just as in the Iliad, the Posthomerica Eris is the instigator of conflict, does not take sides, shouts, and delights in the carnage of battle. Eris is also mentioned in the Dionysiaca of Nonnus. At the start of the epic confrontation between Zeus and Typhon, Nonnus has Nike (Victory) lead Zeus into battle, and Eris lead Typhon, and in another passage has Eris, with the war-goddess Enyo, bring "Tumult" to both sides of a battle.

== Iconography ==
There are few certain representations of Eris in art. Her earliest appearances (mid-sixth-century BC) are found on the Chest of Cypselus and in the tondo of a black-figure cup (Berlin F1775). The geographer Pausanias describes seeing Eris depicted on the Chest, as a "most repulsive" [aischistê] woman standing between Ajax and Hector fighting. On the cup she is depicted as a normal woman in appearance apart from having wings and winged-sandals.

From the later part of fifth-century BC, the upper section of a red-figure calyx krater depicts Eris with Themis facing each other, apparently in animated discussion, while the lower section depicts the Judgement of Paris, confirming Eris' role in the events as told in the Cypria.

== Gallery ==
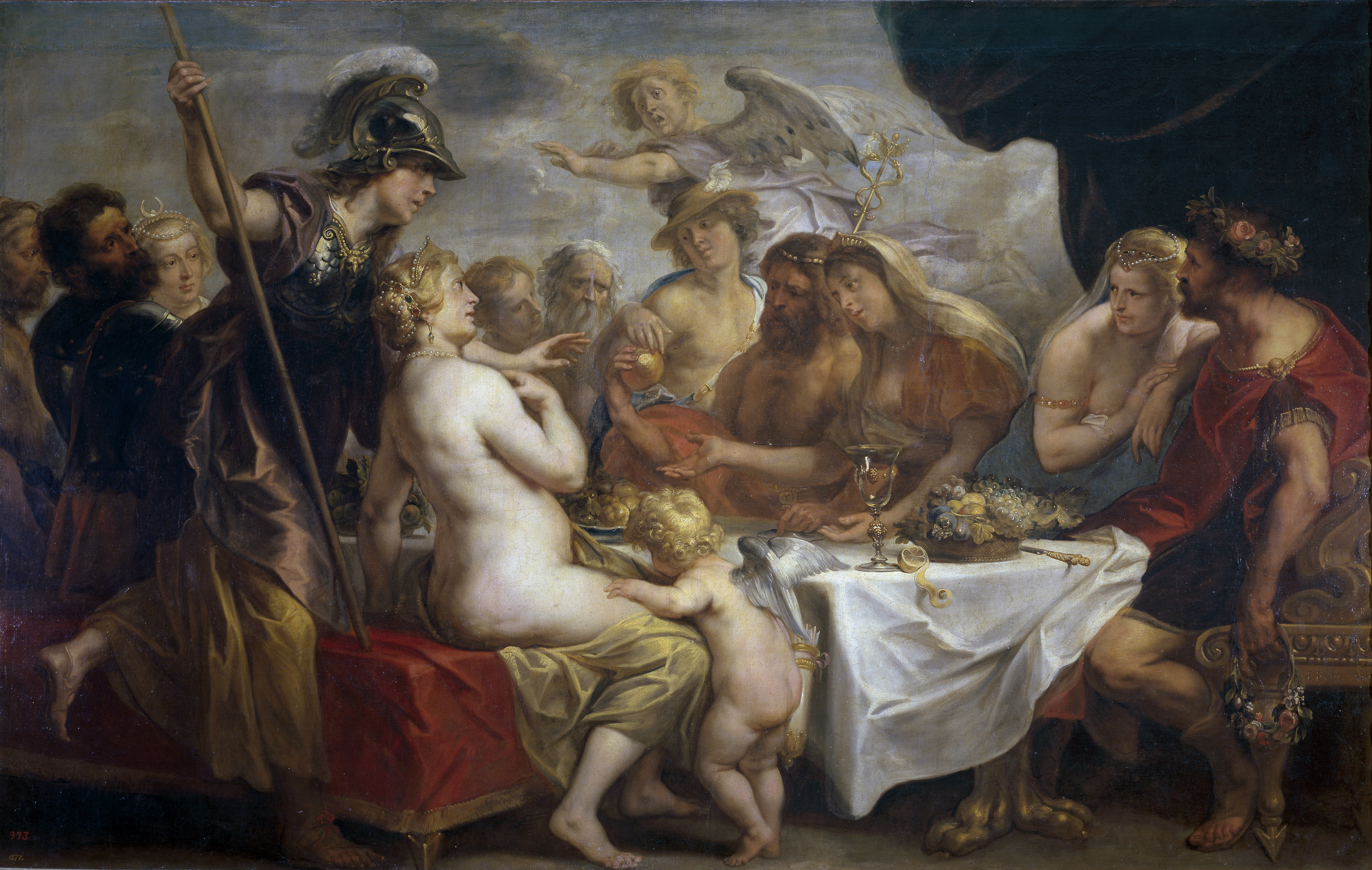
Golden apple of discord by Jakob Jordaens, 1633

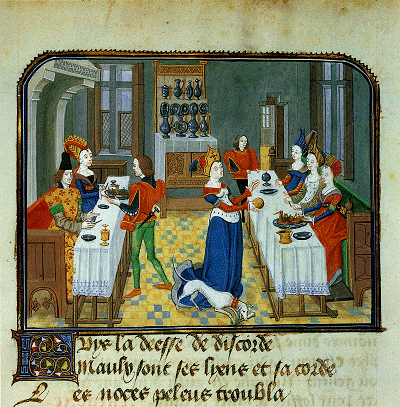
Manuscript illustration of Eris at the wedding of Peleus and Thetis from Jean Miélot's L'Epître d'Othéa c. 1460

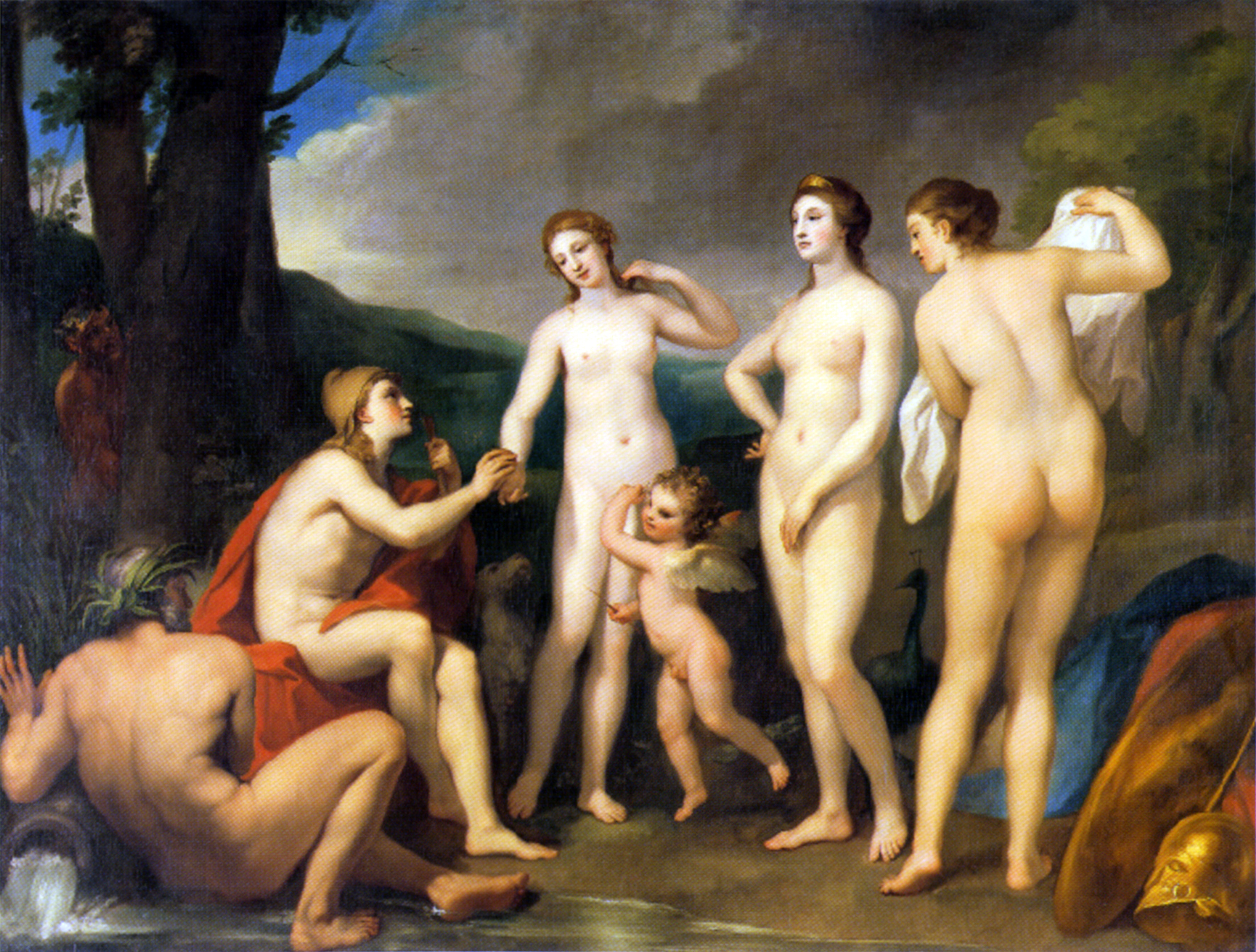
Das Urteil des Paris by Anton Raphael Mengs, c. 1757

== Cultural influences ==
The classic fairy tale "Sleeping Beauty" references what appears to be Eris's role in the wedding of Peleus and Thetis. Like Eris, a malevolent fairy curses a princess after not being invited to the princess's christening.

Eris is the principal figure of worship in the modern Discordian religion invented as an "absurdist joke" in 1957 by two school friends Gregory Hill and Kerry Wendell Thornley. As mythologized in the religion's satirical text Principia Discordia, written by Hill with Thornely and others, Eris (apparently) spoke to Hill and Thornley in an all-night bowling alley, in the form of a chimpanzee.

The dwarf planet Eris was named after this Greek goddess in 2006.

In 2019, the New Zealand moth species Ichneutica eris was named in honour of Eris.

== See also ==
- Eristic
