= Hysminai =

Personifications of fighting in Greek mythology

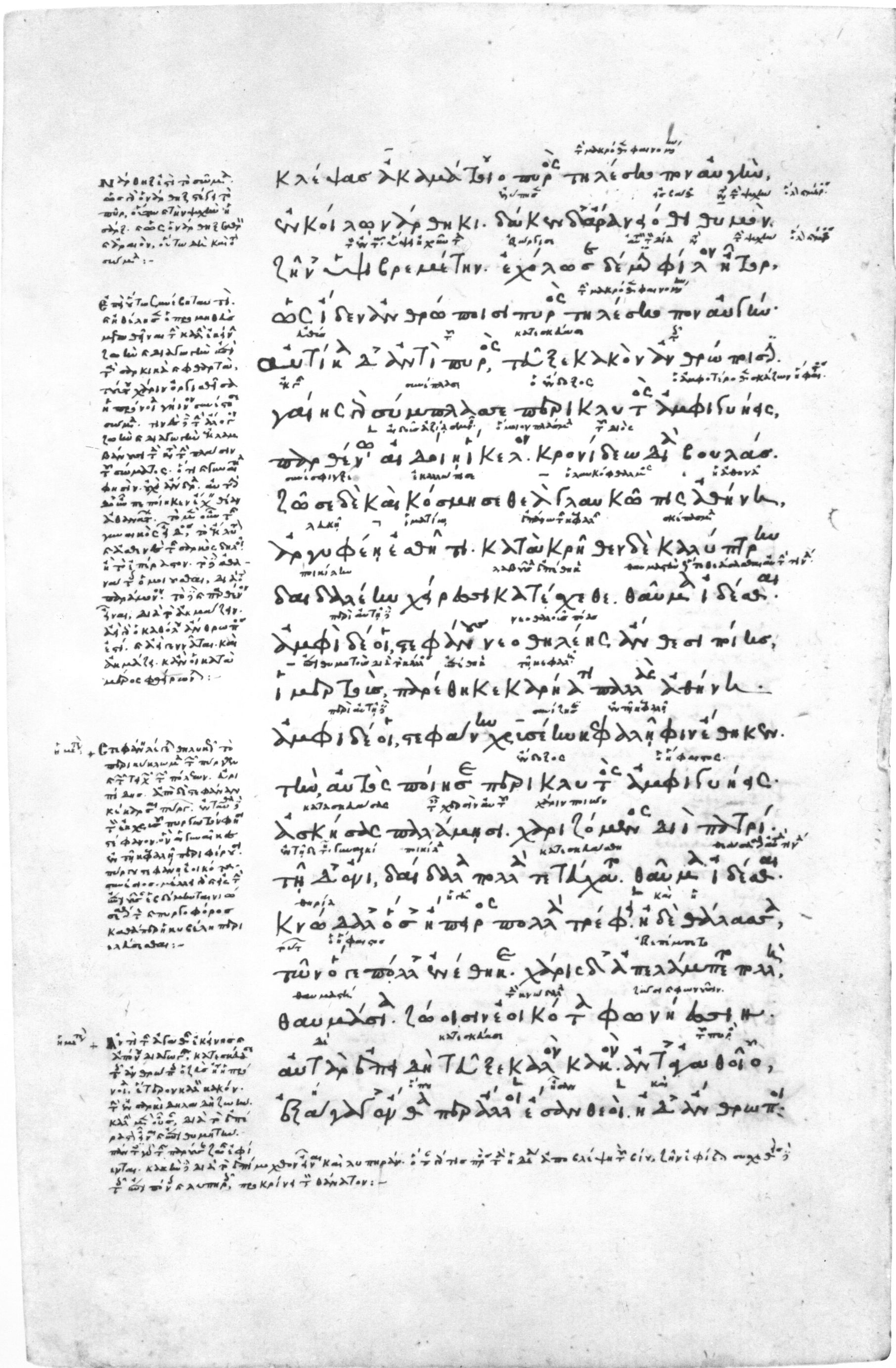
Hesiod’s Theogony

In Greek mythology, the Hysminai or Hysminae (Ancient Greek: Ὑσμῖναι, lit. 'Combats, Fights, Battles', from the plural of ὑσμίνη) are collectively the personification of combat. In Hesiod's Theogony, the Hysminai are listed among the children of Eris (Strife). Like all of the children of Eris given by Hesiod, the Hysminai are a personified abstraction, allegorizing the meaning of their name, and representing one of the many harmful things which might be thought to result from discord and strife, with no other identity.

The Posthomerica of Quintus Smyrnaeus describes the images decorating the shield of Achilles, which, among others such as Eris, the Furies, and the war-goddess Enyo, also included the Hysminai, alongside Thanatos (Death):

Around him [Death] could be seen the ill-sounding goddesses of Combat [Hysminai] whose limbs dripped blood and sweat to the ground.

The Roman mythographer Hyginus has "Fighting", the similar singular personification of the meaning of the Latin word pugna (fight, battle, combat) as the offspring of Ether [Aether] and Earth [Terra].

== Associations ==
Hesiod's Theogony, line 228, lists four personified plural abstractions, the Hysminai (Combats), the Machai (Battles), the Phonoi (Murders), and the Androktasiai (Slaughters), as being among the offspring of Eris (Strife):

Ὑσμίνας τε Μάχας τε Φόνους τ’ Ἀνδροκτασίας τε

These four abstractions were associated in other ancient poetry. The nearly identical line, listing the same four (without capitalizations, and with different case endings), in the same order, occurs in Homer's Odyssey, where Odysseus describes the decorations on Heracles' golden belt:

ὑσμῖναί τε μάχαι τε φόνοι τ᾿ ἀνδροκτασίαι τε.

The abstraction ὑσμῖναί (combats) was also associated with μάχαι (battles) in the Homeric Hymn 5 To Aphrodite.
