= Ioke (mythology) =

Greek mythological figure

In Greek mythology, Ioke (/aɪˈoʊkiː/; Ancient Greek: Ἰωκή) is the female personification of onslaught, battle-tumult, routing, and pursuit. In the Iliad, she is one of the daimones, or spirits, of Zeus's aegis and occasionally listed among the Machai. The other daimones are Phobos, Eris, and Alke. Ioke was probably the same as Proioxis.

The ancient Greek word ἰωκή is a rare doublet for διωκή "rout, onslaught, pursuit" from the common verb διώκω "drive, pursue, chase away".

== Mythology ==
Ioke's parentage is never stated, but she may have been a daughter of Eris, as were many daimones. She is described in the Iliad as thus:

"Across her [Athena's] shoulders she threw the betasselled, terrible aigis (aegis), all about which Phobos (Terror) hangs like a garland, and Eris (Hatred) is there, and Alke (Battle Strength), and heart-freezing Ioke (Onslaught) and thereon is set the head of the grim gigantic Gorgo (Gorgon), a thing of fear and horror, portent of Zeus of the aigis."
