= Alke =

Name of multiple Greek mythological figures

In Greek mythology, the name Alke or Alce /ˈælkiː/ (Ancient Greek: Ἀλκή, romanized: Alké, lit. 'prowess' or 'courage') may refer to:

- Alke, the spirit and personification of the abstract concept of courage and battle-strength. In the Iliad, she was depicted on Athena's aegis alongside Ioke, Eris and Phobos.
- Alke, daughter of Cybele and Olympus. She was given a second name, Cybele, after her mother.
- Alke, an Amazon.
- Alke, one of Actaeon's dogs.
