= Machai =

Daemons of battle and combat in Greek mythology

In Greek mythology, the Machai or Machae (Ancient Greek: Μάχαi, lit. 'Battles, Wars', from the plural of μάχη) are collectively the personification of battle and war. In Hesiod's Theogony, the Machai are listed among the children of Eris (Strife). Like all of the children of Eris given by Hesiod, the Machai are a personified abstraction, allegorizing the meaning of their name, and representing one of the many harmful things which might be thought to result from discord and strife, with no other identity.

== Associations ==
Hesiod's Theogony, line 228, lists four personified plural abstractions, the Hysminai (Combats), the Machai (Battles), the Phonoi (Murders), and the Androktasiai (Slaughters), as being among the offspring of Eris (Strife):

Ὑσμίνας τε Μάχας τε Φόνους τ’ Ἀνδροκτασίας τε

These four abstractions were associated in other ancient poetry. The same four, in the same order, occur in a line from Homer's Odyssey, where Odysseus describes the decorations on Heracles' golden belt:

ὑσμῖναί τε μάχαι τε φόνοι τ᾿ ἀνδροκτασίαι τε.

The abstraction μάχαι (battles) was also associated with ὑσμῖναί (combats) in the Homeric Hymn 5 To Aphrodite, and with ἀνδροκτασίαι (Slaughters) in Homer's, Iliad.

That the Machai, the personification of battle and wars, would be considered to be the sons of Eris, the goddess of strife and discord, is fitting. War is associated with Eris, for example, in Hesiod's Works and Days, which says that Eris "fosters evil war and conflict", and in Homer's Iliad, where Eris is called a "sister and comrade" of Ares, and holds in her hands "a portent of war".

== See also ==
- Polemus
