= Shield of Heracles =

Archaic Greek epic poem

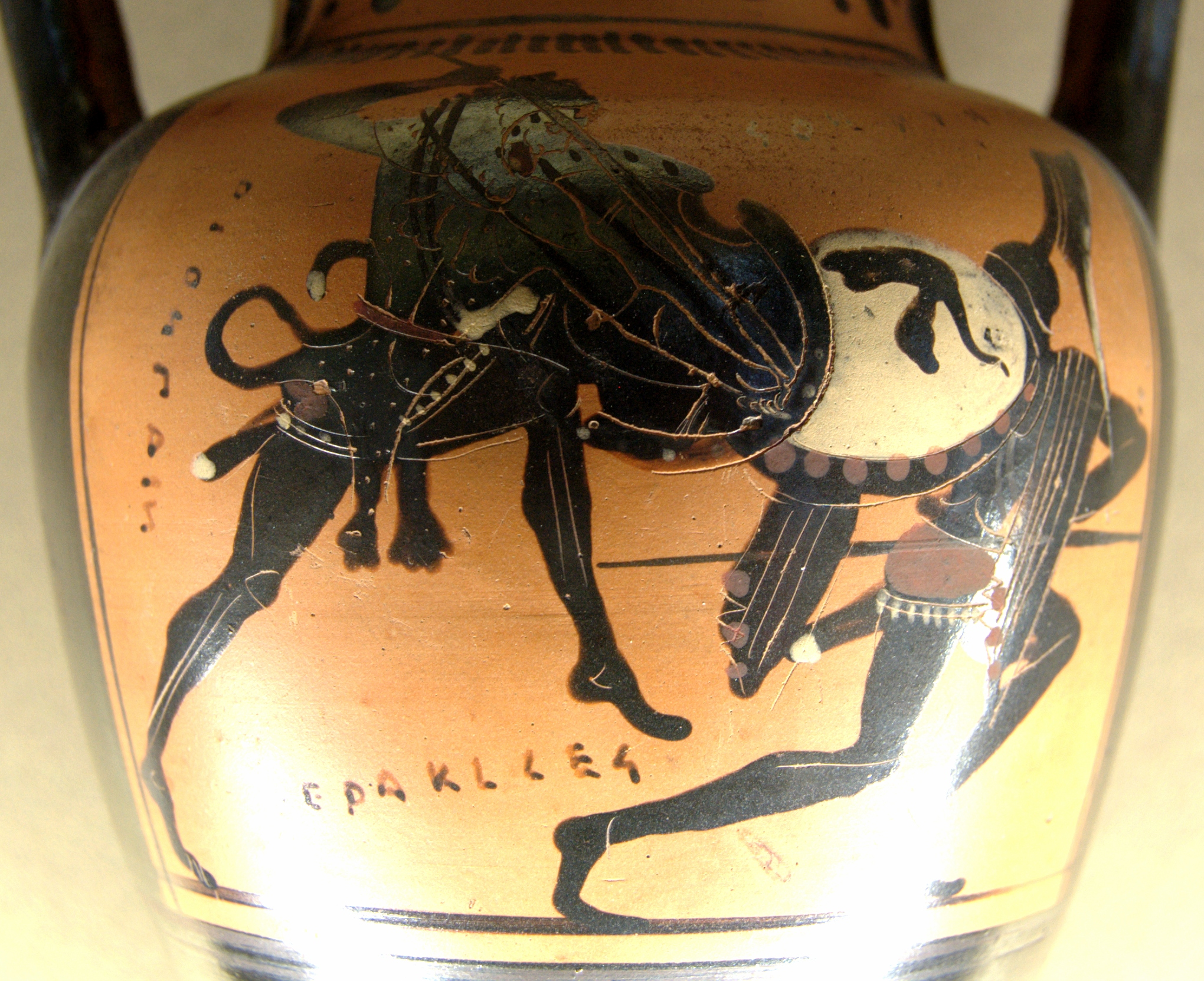
An early 5th-century BCE depiction of Heracles (left) fighting Cycnus (Attic black-figure amphora, found at Nola)

The Shield of Heracles (Ancient Greek: Ἀσπὶς Ἡρακλέους, Aspis Hērakleous) is an archaic Greek epic poem that was attributed to Hesiod during antiquity. The subject of the poem is the expedition of Heracles and Iolaus against Cycnus, the son of Ares, who challenged Heracles to combat as Heracles was passing through Thessaly. It is generally dated from the end of the 7th to the middle of the 6th century BCE.

It has been suggested that this epic might reflect anti-Thessalian feeling after the First Sacred War (595–585 BCE): in the epic, a Thessalian hero interfering with the Phocian sanctuary is killed by a Boeotian hero (Heracles), whose mortal father Amphitryon had for allies Locrians and Phocians. This was a pastiche made to be sung at a Boeotian festival at midsummer at the hottest time of the dogstar Sirios.

To serve as an introduction, fifty-six lines have been taken from the Hesiodic Catalogue of Women. The late 3rd- and early 2nd-century BCE critic Aristophanes of Byzantium, who considered the Catalogue to be the work of Hesiod, noted the borrowing, which led him to suspect that the Shield was spurious.

Compare Virgil's "shield of Aeneas" (Aeneid viii.617–731) and the much briefer description of Crenaeus' shield in Thebaid ix.332–338. Marcus Mettius Epaphroditus wrote a commentary on the Shield of Heracles in the 1st century CE.

== The shield's description ==
The poem takes its cue from the extended description of the shield of Achilles in Iliad xviii, from which it borrows directly, with a single word altered:

ἐν δ' Ἔρις ἐν δὲ Κυδοιμὸς ὁμίλεον, ἐν δ' ὀλοὴ Κήρ
ἄλλον ζωὸν ἔχουσα νεούτατον, ἄλλον ἄουτον,
ἄλλον τεθνηῶτα κατὰ μόθον ἕλκε ποδοῖιν·
εἷμα δ' ἔχ' ἀμφ' ὤμοισι δαφοινεὸν αἵματι φωτῶν.

—Iliad 18.535–8
Translation:

Upon it Strife, upon it Uproar joined battle, upon it baneful Death,
holding one freshly wounded, another unwounded,
another she dragged dead through the battle by the foot:
she wore around her shoulders a garment red with the gore of men.

ἐν δ' Ἔρις, ἐν δὲ Κυδοιμὸς ἐθύνεον, ἐν δ' ὀλοὴ Κὴρ
ἄλλον ζωὸν ἔχουσα νεούτατον, ἄλλον ἄουτον,
ἄλλον τεθνηῶτα κατὰ μόθον ἕλκε ποδοῖιν·
εἷμα δ' ἔχ' ἀμφ' ὤμοισι δαφοινεὸν αἵματι φωτῶν,

—Shield 156–9
Translation:

Upon it Strife, upon it Uproar rushed, upon it baneful Death,
holding one freshly wounded, another unwounded,
another she dragged dead through the battle by the foot:
she wore around her shoulders a garment red with the gore of men.

The Iliad gives just enough detail for its hearers to marvel at Hephaestus' workmanship. The Shield of Heracles makes heavier use of description:

They were bringing the brides through the streets from their homes, to the loud music of the wedding-hymn and the light of blazing torches. Youths accompanied by flute and lyre were whirling in the dance, and the women had come to the doors of their houses to enjoy the show. (Iliad).

The men were making merry with festivities and dances; some were bringing home a bride to her husband on a well-wheeled car, while the bridalsong swelled high, and the glow of blazing torches held by handmaidens rolled in waves afar. And these maidens went before, delighting in the festival; and after them came frolicsome choirs, the youths singing soft-mouthed to the sound of shrill pipes, while the echo was shivered around them, and the girls led on the lovely dance to the sound of lyres. (Shield of Heracles).

The round shield's "whole orb shimmered with enamel and white ivory and electrum, and it glowed with shining gold; and there were zones of cyanus drawn upon it." Cyanus denotes a blue low-fired glass-paste or smalt. At the center was a mask of Fear (Phobos) with the staring eyes and teeth of a gorgon. Though Achilles' shield has nothing about it that might mar its function, the shield of Heracles is a tour de force of high relief: the vineyard has "shivering leaves and stakes of silver" and the snake heads "would clash their teeth when Amphitryon's son was fighting" and in the ocean vignette the "fishes of bronze were trembling." As for "the horseman Perseus: his feet did not touch the shield and yet were not far from it—very marvellous to remark, since he was not supported anywhere; for so did the famous Lame One fashion him of gold with his hands."

The extravagant description seems to have encouraged rhapsodes to contribute their interpolations, which have been identified and teased apart by modern scholarship. Some similes may strike the careful listener as infelicitous, such as the contrast of glowering with fierce action in "fiercely he stared, like a lion who has come upon a body and full eagerly rips the hide with his strong claws..."

== Reception ==
The popularity of the Shield of Heracles in 6th-century BCE Athens may be assessed from instances where H. A. Shapiro detected its presence in Attic vase-painting between ca 565 and ca 480 BCE. A calyx-krater by Euphronios depicting the minor episode of Heracles' combat with the Thessalian brigand Kyknos occasioned Shapiro's examination of the myth's creative reworking among Attic vase-painters, who based their imagery of Heracles' shield on the literary model. The likelihood of both oral and literary transmission during the same time is noted by Janko.

== Textual history ==
The Shield of Heracles was first printed, included with the complete works of Hesiod, by Aldus Manutius, in Venice, 1495; the text was from Byzantine manuscripts. In modern times several papyri have offered sections of the text, notably a 1st-century papyrus in Berlin (Berlin Papyri, 9774), a 2nd-century papyrus from Oxyrhynchus (Oxyrhynchus Papyri 689), and the 4th-century Rainer Papyrus (L.P. 21–29) at Vienna. There are numerous texts from the 12th to the 15th century.

== Sources ==
- Athanassakis, Apostolos. Hesiod: Theogony, Works and Days and The Shield of Heracles (1983) Translation, introduction and commentary.
- Bauer-Zetzmann, Martin (2025). Das bunte Epos. Untersuchungen zur pseudohesiodeischen Aspis [The Colourful Epic. Studies on the Pseudo-Hesiodic Aspis]. Zetemata, vol. 162. Munich: Beck, ISBN 978-3-406-83282-6.
- Chiarini, Sara. L'archeologia dello Scutum Herculis. Roma: 2012.
- Hesiod, Shield of Heracles, in The Homeric Hymns and Homerica with an English Translation by Hugh G. Evelyn-White, Cambridge, Massachusetts, Harvard University Press; London, William Heinemann Ltd. 1914. Online version at the Perseus Digital Library.
- Janko, Richard "The Shield of Heracles and the Legend of Cycnus" The Classical Quarterly New Series, 36.1 (1986), pp. 38–59. Bibliography of the genesis of The Shield of Heracles p 38 note 1.
- Lattimore, Richmond, Hesiod: The Works and Days, Theogony, and the Shield of Heracles (Ann Arbor) 1970.
- Lynn-George, J.M. (1978), "The Relationship of Σ 535–540 and Scutum 156–160 Re-examined", Hermes, 106 (3): 396–405, JSTOR 4476070
- Most, G.W., Hesiod, Theogony, Works and Days, Testimonia, Edited and translated by Glenn W. Most, Loeb Classical Library No. 57, Cambridge, Massachusetts, Harvard University Press, 2018. ISBN 978-0-674-99720-2. Online version at Harvard University Press.
