= Keres =

Greek goddesses of violent death

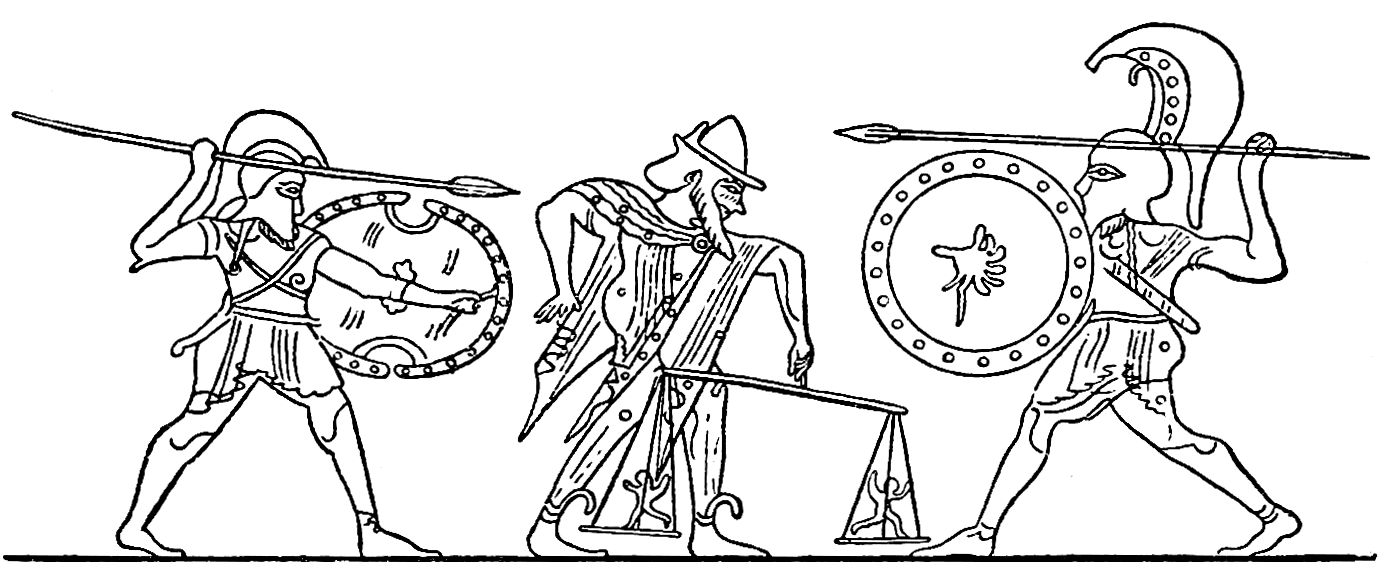
Weighing the Keres (fates of death) by Hermes

In Greek mythology, the Keres (/ˈkɪriːz/; Ancient Greek: Κῆρες) were malevolent spirits who brought pestilence and ruin. They feasted on dead and dying warriors. The Keres were daughters of Nyx, and as such the sisters of beings such as Moirai, who controlled the fate of souls, and Thanatos, the god of death. Some later authorities, such as Cicero, called them by a Latin name, Tenebrae 'the Darknesses', and named them daughters of Erebus and Nyx.

The singular form of the name is Ker (/ˈkɜr/; Κήρ), which, according to Hesiod, refers to an entity distinct from the Keres. Ancient sources seldom distinguish or enumerate the Keres, describing them instead as a vast and host. In the Iliad, they are portrayed as "thousands" (myriai) in number. Mimnermus, however, speaks of only two: "one bringing old age, the other death". Quintus Smyrnaeus similarly mentions "twin Keres, one dark, one bright".

== Etymology ==
The Greek word κήρ means "death" or "doom" and appears as a proper noun in the singular and plural as Κήρ and Κῆρες to refer to divinities. Homer uses the phrase κῆρες θανάτοιο, "keres of death". Although it is not a proper noun, Cunliff refers to this as "more or less distinctly personified" as an "agent of death". By extension the word may mean "plague, disease" and in prose "blemish or defect". The relative verb κεραΐζω or κείρω means "ravage or plunder". Sometimes in Homer the words κήρ and moira have similar meanings. The older meaning was probably "destruction of the dead", and Hesychius of Alexandria relates the word to the verb κηραινειν "decay".

== Description ==
And Nyx (Night) bare hateful Moros (Doom) and black Ker (Violent Death) and Thanatos (Death), and she bare Hypnos (Sleep) and the tribe of Oneiroi (Dreams). And again the goddess murky Nyx, though she lay with none, bare Momus (Blame) and painful Oizys (Misery), and the Hesperides ... Also she bare the Moirai (Fates) and the ruthless avenging Keres (Death-Fates) ... Also deadly Nyx bare Nemesis (Revenge) to afflict mortal men, and after her, Apate (Deceit) and Philotes (Friendship) and hateful Geras (Old Age) and hard-hearted Eris (Strife).

— Hesiod, Theogony 211, translated by Hugh G. Evelyn-White

They were described as dark beings with gnashing teeth and claws and with a thirst for human blood. They would hover over the battlefield and search for dying and wounded men. A description of the Keres can be found in the Shield of Heracles (248–57):

The black Dooms gnashing their white teeth, grim-eyed, fierce, bloody, terrifying fought over the men who were dying for they were all longing to drink dark blood. As soon as they caught a man who had fallen or one newly wounded, one of them clasped her great claws around him and his soul went down to Hades, to chilly Tartarus. And when they had satisfied their hearts with human blood, they would throw that one behind them and rush back again into the battle and the tumult.

A parallel, and equally unusual personification of "the baleful Ker" is in Homer's depiction of the Shield of Achilles (Iliad, ix. 410ff), which is the model for the Shield of Heracles. These are works of art that are being described.

In the fifth century, Keres were portrayed as small winged sprites in vase-paintings adduced by J.E. Harrison (Harrison, 1903), who described apotropaic rites and rites of purification that were intended to keep the Keres at bay.

According to a statement of Stesichorus noted by Eustathius, Stesichorus "called the Keres by the name Telchines", whom Eustathius identified with the Kuretes of Crete, who could call up squalls of wind and would brew potions from herbs (noted in Harrison, p. 171).

The term Keres has also been cautiously used to describe a person's fate. An example of this can be found in the Iliad where Achilles was given the choice (or Keres) between either a long and obscure life and home, or death at Troy and everlasting glory. Also, when Achilles and Hector were about to engage in a fight to the death, the god Zeus weighed both warriors' keres to determine who shall die. As Hector’s ker was deemed heavier, he was the one destined to die and in the weighing of souls, Zeus chooses Hector to be killed. During the festival known as Anthesteria, the Keres were driven away. Their Roman equivalents were Letum (“death”) or the Tenebrae (“shadows”).

Hunger, pestilence, madness, nightmare have each a sprite behind them; are all sprites," J.E. Harrison observed (Harrison 1903, p 169), but two Keres might not be averted, and these, which emerged from the swarm of lesser ills, were Old Age and Death. Odysseus says, "Death and the Ker avoiding, we escape" (Odyssey xii.158), where the two are not quite identical: Harrison (p. 175) found the Christian parallel "death and the angel of death.

== Keres and Valkyries ==
Mathias Egeler suggests a connection exists between the Keres and the Valkyries of Norse mythology. Both deities are war spirits that fly over battlefields during conflicts and choose those to be slain. The difference is that Valkyries are benevolent deities in contrast to the malevolence of the Keres, perhaps due to the different outlook of the two cultures towards war. The word valkyrie derives from Old Norse valkyrja (plural valkyrjur), which is composed of two words; the noun valr (referring to the slain on the battlefield) and the verb kjósa (meaning "to choose"). Together, they mean "chooser of the slain". The Greek word "Ker" etymologically means destruction, death.

== See also ==
- Eurynomos – Spirit of the underworld
- Badb – Deity
- Shikome – Undead hag in Japanese mythology
- Datsue-ba – Japanese Buddhist deity
