= List of paintings by Enrique Simonet =

This is an incomplete list of the oil paintings by Enrique Simonet (February 2, 1866 – April 20, 1927), a Spanish painter during the Impressionist movement.

== Paintings by Simonet ==
=== Dated works ===
Below are oil paintings by Simonet that have a signed or attributed date of creation:

| Image | English Title | Spanish Title | Year | Location | Dimensions (cm.) | Comments |
|---|---|---|---|---|---|---|
| | Portrait of Lola, sister of the artist | Retrato de Lola, hermana del artista | 1884–1885 | | 32 × 20 | |
| | Self-portrait | Autorretrato | 1885 | | 58 × 42 | |
| | Málaga earthquake | Terremoto en Málaga | 1885 | | 76 × 46 | |
| | The Burial of Saint Lawrence | El entierro de San Lorenzo | 1886 | | | |
| | The Beheading of Saint Paul | Decapitación de San Pablo | 1887 | Málaga Cathedral | 400 × 700 | |
| | Venetian Waterscape | Marina veneciana | 1887–1890 | | 33 × 58 | |
| | Nessus and Deianira | Neso y Deyanira | 1888 | | 116 × 151 | |
| | | Tropezón en el coro de la Catedral de Málaga | 1888 | | | |
| | Málaga Beach at Dusk | Playa de Málaga al atardecer | 1889 | | 75 × 115 | |
| | Canon reading | Canónigo leyendo | 1889 | | 100 × 68 | |
| | Portrait of the Lady | Retrato de señora | 1889 | | 99 × 69 | |
| | Girl from Ciociaria | Chica de Ciociara | 1889 | | 63 × 45 | |
| | Woman from Ciociaria | Mujer de Ciociaria | 1889 | | 103 × 70 | |
| | Neapolitan landscape | Paisaje napolitano | 1890 | | | |
| | | Paisaje de Nazaret | 1890 | | 18 × 33 | |
| | An Autopsy or And She Had a Heart! | ¡Y tenía corazón! (Anatomía del corazón) or La autopsia | 1890 | Museo del Prado | 177 × 291 | |
| | | Cementario Judío | 1890 | | 10 × 17 | |
| | | Escena campesina en Grecia | 1890 | | 17 × 26 | |
| | | Vista de Jerusalén | 1890 | | 19 × 34 | |
| | | La Gran Esfinge | 1890 | | 165 × 335 | |
| | | Villa de Pompeya | 1890 | | 18 × 29 | |
| | Flock of sheep | Rebaño de ovejas | 1890–1892 | | 48 × 74 | |
| | Study of Jesus’ Head for Flevit super Illam | Cabeza de Jesús | 1890–1891 | Museo del Prado | 56 × 37 | This was a study for Flevit super Illam where Simonet was experience with the effects of illumination and reflection. |
| | Estudio de cabeza de apóstol para Flevit super Illam | Cabeza para Flevit | 1890–1891 | Museo del Prado | 57 × 38 | Like Study of Jesus’ Head for Flevit super Illam, this is a preparatory study. This man is seen donning a red scarf towards the right of Flevit Super Illam. |
| | Flevit super illam | | 1892 | Museo del Prado | 305 × 555 | This work depicts the biblical event Flevit super Illam. |
| | Smoking Shisha in the Tearoom | Fumando shisha en la tetería | 1892 | Museo del Prado | 29 × 46 | |
| | Enrique Simonet y Baca, the artist's father | Retrato de Enrique Simonet Baca padre del artista | 1893 | Museo del Prado | 100 × 70 | The painting depicts Simonet's father. |
| | Portrait of Asunción Castro, wife of the painter | Retrato de Asunción Castro, esposa del pintor | 1894 | | | |
| | Marrakesh | | 1894 | | 60 × 98 | |
| | | Danza de las conchas | 1894 | | 56 × 98 | |
| | Dance of the Veils | Danza de los velos | 1896 | | 46 × 76 | |
| | | El Quite | 1897 | | 269 × 483 | |
| | The Barber at the Souk | El barbero del zoco | 1897 | | 32 × 50 | |
| | The Fortune Teller | La buenaventura | 1899 | | 61 × 84 | |
| | La suerte de varas | La suerte de varas | 1899 | | 23 × 38 | |
| | The Judgement of Paris | El Juicio de Paris | 1904 | | 215 × 331 | |
| | Portrait of Lola, artist's daughter | Retrato de Lola, hija del pintor | 1904 | | | |
| | | Mercado del Berbés, Vigo | 1905 | | 56 × 77 | |
| | Eclipse | Eclipse | 1905 | | 75 × 55 | |
| | The first Mass | La primera misa | 1907 | | 86 × 128 | |
| | Self-Portrait | Autorretrato | 1910 | Museo del Prado | 97 × 66 | In the background of this self-portrait is Enrique Simonet y Baca, the artist's father (a painting of his father); the image is reversed due to him painting in a mirror. |
| | | Puerta de Alcalá | 1911 | | 38 × 50 | |
| | | Castaños de El Retiro | 1911–1915 | | 60 × 47 | |
| | Tangier Market | Mercado de Tánger | 1913 | | 48 × 64 | |
| | Tangier bazaar | Zoco de Tánger | 1913–1914 | | 46 × 72 | |
| | Tangier at Dusk | Atardecer en Tánger | 1914 | | 68 × 93 | |
| | Terraces of Tangier | Terrazas de Tánger | 1914 | | 56 × 84 | |
| | Asunción Castro Crespo, the painter's wife | Retrato de Asunción Castro esposa del pintor | 1914 | Museo del Prado | 102 × 71 | This painting features the painter's wife during the first months of pregnancy. |
| | The Fortune Teller | La buenaventura | 1915 | | 70 × 90 | |
| | Self-Portrait | Autorretrato | 1918 | | 98 × 56 | |
| | Autumn in the Pastures | Otoño en la Dehesa | 1918 | | 58 × 43 | |
| | Dehesa de la Villa | Dehesa de la Villa | 1918–1920 | | 46 × 55 | |
| | La Moncloa Landscape | Paisaje de La Moncloa | 1918–1920 | | 47 × 56 | |
| | Reflections on the River | Dobles chopos en el río | 1918–1923 | | 62 × 44 | |
| | | Orando a la Virgen en el Monasterio de El Paular | 1920–1926 | | 70 × 90 | |
| | El Paular Landscape | Paisaje de El Paular | 1921 | | 77 × 55 | |
| | | Camino de El Paular | 1891–1893 | | 62 × 78 | |
| | El Paular pool | Estanque de El Paular | 1921–1923 | | 71 × 49 | |
| | Hiruela Waterfall | Cascada de La Hiruela | 1921–1923 | | 70 × 90 | |
| | | Clotilde lavando en la poza | 1922 | | 70 × 90 | |
| | Children under the cherry tree | Niños bajo el cerezo | c. 1926 | | 67 × 86.5 | |

=== Undated Works ===
Below are oil paintings by Simonet with unknown or uncertain dates of creation:

| Image | English Title | Spanish Title | Location | Dimensions (cm.) | Comments |
|---|---|---|---|---|---|
| | Portrait of Francisco Javier Simonet, uncle of the artist | Retrato de Francisco Javier Simonet, tío del artista | | | |
| | Portrait of Antonio, brother of the artist | Retrato de Antonio, hermano del artista | | 55 × 42 | |
| | Portrait of Mercedes, daughter of the artist or Lady with a Fan | Retrato de Mercedes, hija del artista or Dama con abanico | | | |
| | Portrait of Antonio Muñoz Degrain | Retrato de Antonio Muñoz Degrain | | 71 × 53 | |
| | Portrait of El Piyayo | Retrato de El Piyayo | | 50 × 40 | |
| | Portrait of the Lady | Retrato de señora | | 124 × 71 | |
| | Portrait of the Gentleman | Retrato de señor | | 100 × 70 | |
| | Portrait of the Lady | Retrato de señora | | 100 × 70 | |
| | Portrait of the Gentleman | Retrato de señor | | 70 × 54 | |
| | Portrait of the Gentleman | Retrato de señor | | | |
| | Prayer to Allah | Oración a Alá | | 93 × 66 | |
| | Berber | Bereber | | | |
| | The tea tray | La bandeja del té | | 44 × 31 | |
| | Sappho of Lesbos | Safo de Lesbos | | 82 × 102 | |
| | | Niños mariscadores | | 198 × 149 | |
| | | Desfile de las artes | | 98 × 182 | |
| | | Fuente del parque del Retiro | | 70 × 88.5 | |
| | | Gitana friendo buñuelos en la feria | | 61 × 41 | |
| | | Paisaje | | 95 × 80 | |
| | Cleansing of the Temple | Expulsión de los mercaderes del Templo | | 72 × 91 | |
| | | Lavanderas | | 80 × 125 | |
| | Girl on porch with pigs | Niña en el porche con cerdos | | 28 × 46 | |
