= Enrique Simonet =

Spanish painter (1866–1927)

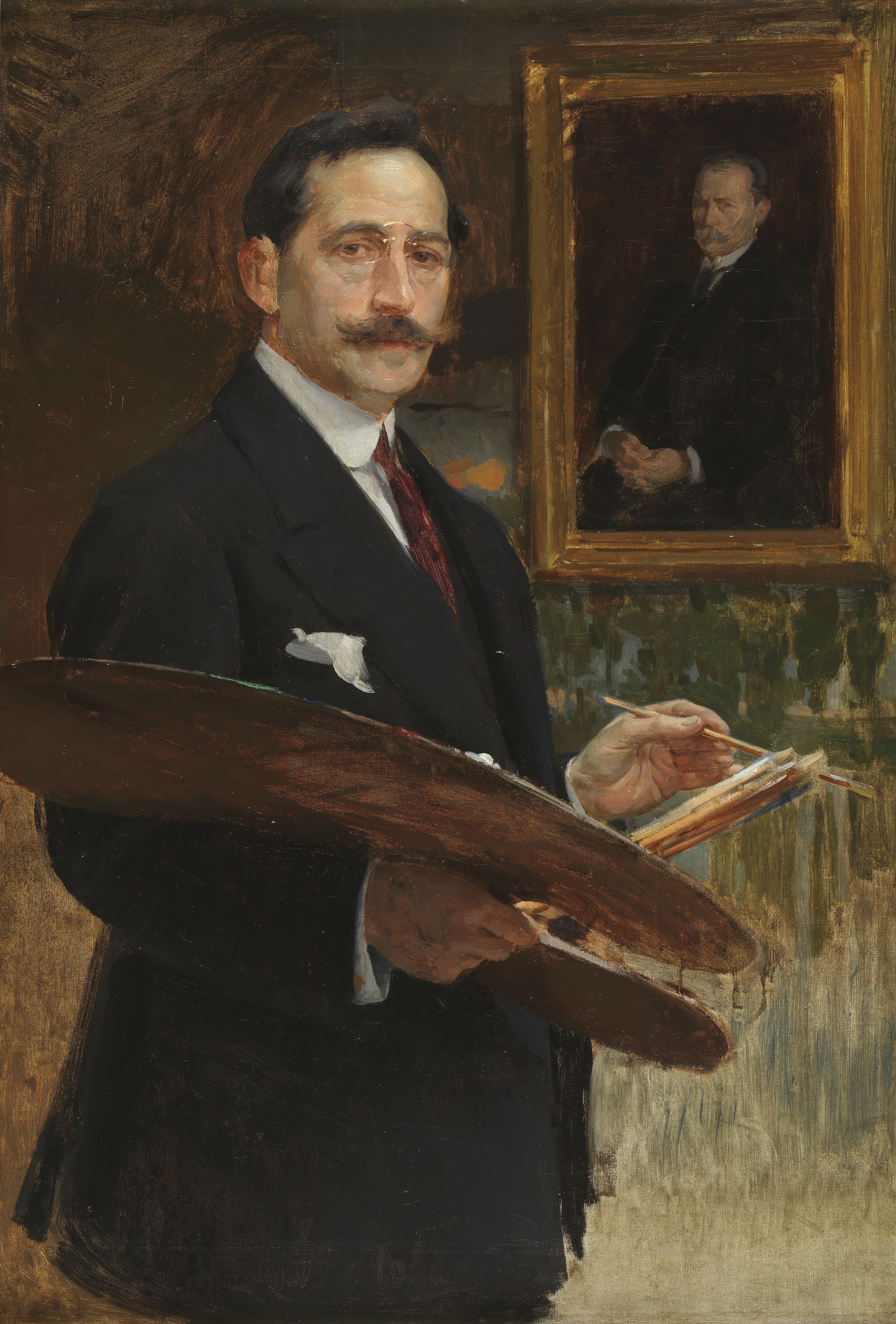
- Self-portrait, 1910
- Born: Enrique Simonet Lombardo; February 2, 1866; Valencia, Spain
- Died: April 20, 1927 (aged 61); Madrid, Spain
- Known for: Painting

Enrique Simonet Lombardo (February 2, 1866 – April 20, 1927) was a Spanish painter.

== Early life ==
Simonet was born in Valencia in a Christian household of high social standing. His father was land-registrar Enrique Simonet Baca (1830–1899) and his mother was María de los Dolores Lombardo Riera; they had five other children. His first vocation of childhood was religious studies, but, with paternal support, he abandoned it to devote himself to painting. Despite being Valencian and studying at the Saint Charles Royal Academy of Fine Arts of Valencia, he joined a circle of artists in the city of Málaga. He also attended the workshop of Bernardo Ferrándiz Bádenes, forming part of the Malaga school of painting.

== Career and travel ==
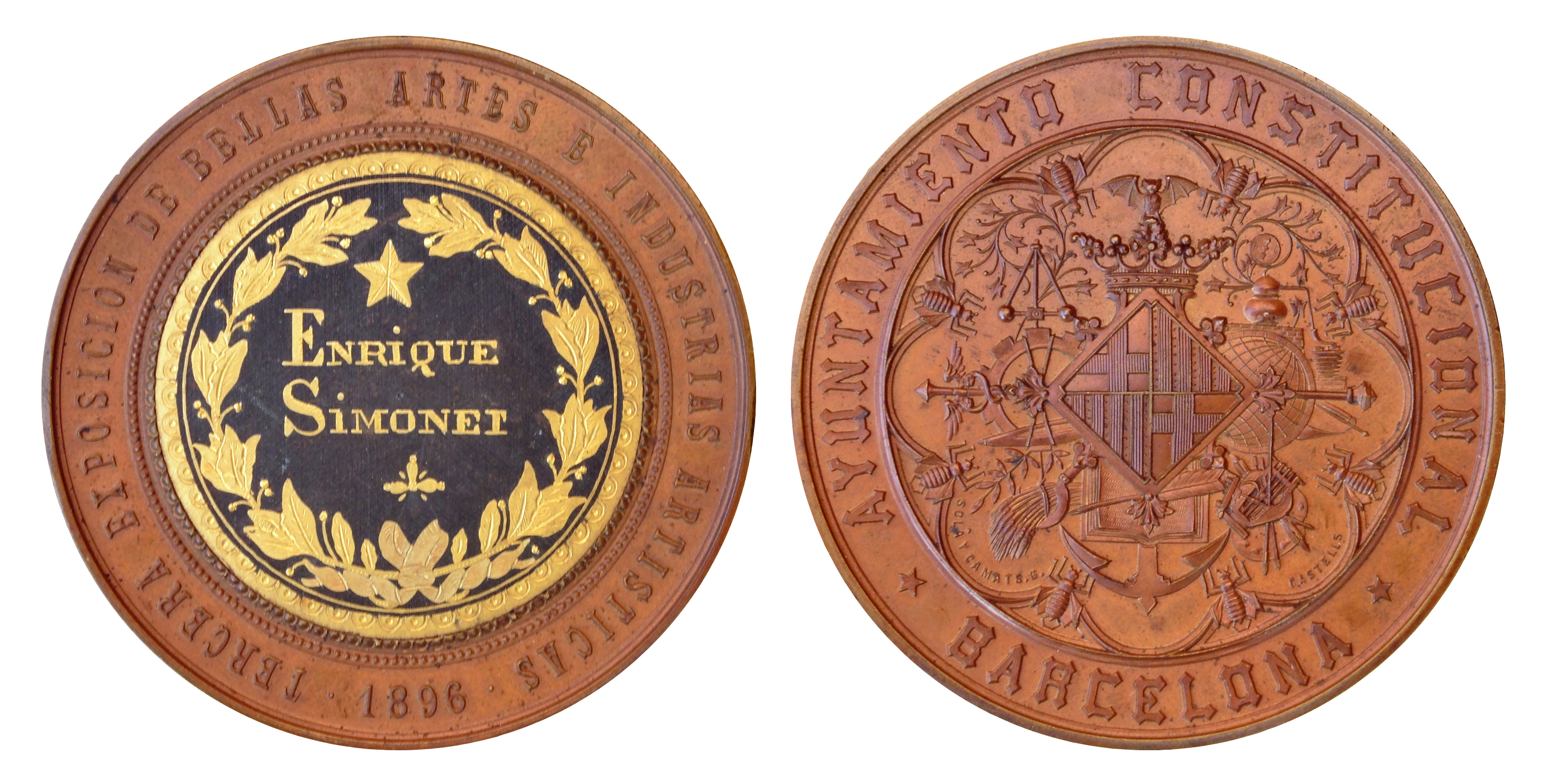
Bronze First Class medal 1896 by the III Exhibition of Fine Arts and Artistic Industries, Barcelona; given for Simonet's Flevit super illam

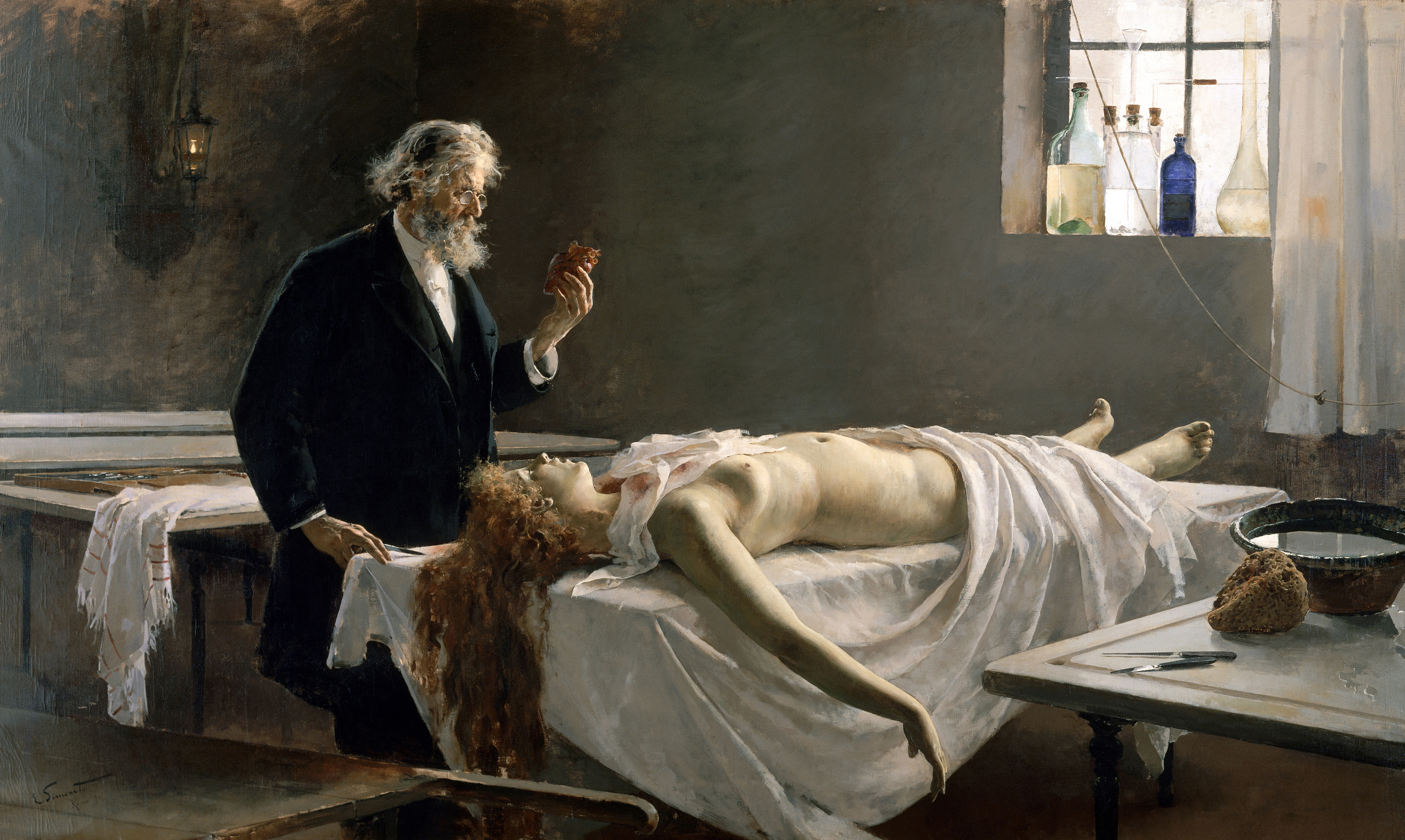
¿Y tenía corazón? (And she had a heart!) 1890 by Simonet; depicts an anatomist grasping a young woman's heart in a morgue reflecting increased Parisian interest in life and death

In 1885, Simonet, funded by his father, made his first trip to Italy. In 1887 obtained a grant to study painting in the Fine Arts Academy in Rome, where he painted in 1890 Heart's Anatomy; a painting that would bring him international recognition and which won him several prizes and was displayed at the Paris Salon in 1895.

Taking advantage of his stay Simonet traveled throughout Italy (including Venice where he painted Venetian Waterscape from 1887–1890), visited Paris several times and in 1890 he made a tour of the Mediterranean. He also traveled to the Holy Land, where he painted his monumental work Flevit super illam (painting) which he received numerous medals for including Madrid in 1892, Chicago in 1893, Barcelona in 1896 and Paris in 1900. In 1893 and 1894 Simonet traveled to North Africa, later acting as a war correspondent in Morocco for the magazine La Ilustración Española y Americana.

Asunción Castro Crespo was born in Córdoba in 1872 and raised in Málaga where she, at 18 years old, met Simonet. On February 26, 1897, Asunción and Enrique got married at the Church of Saint Jerome the Royal in Madrid. They had seven children together. Simonet often used her for his artistic studies, and she was the model for Venus in The Judgement of Paris.

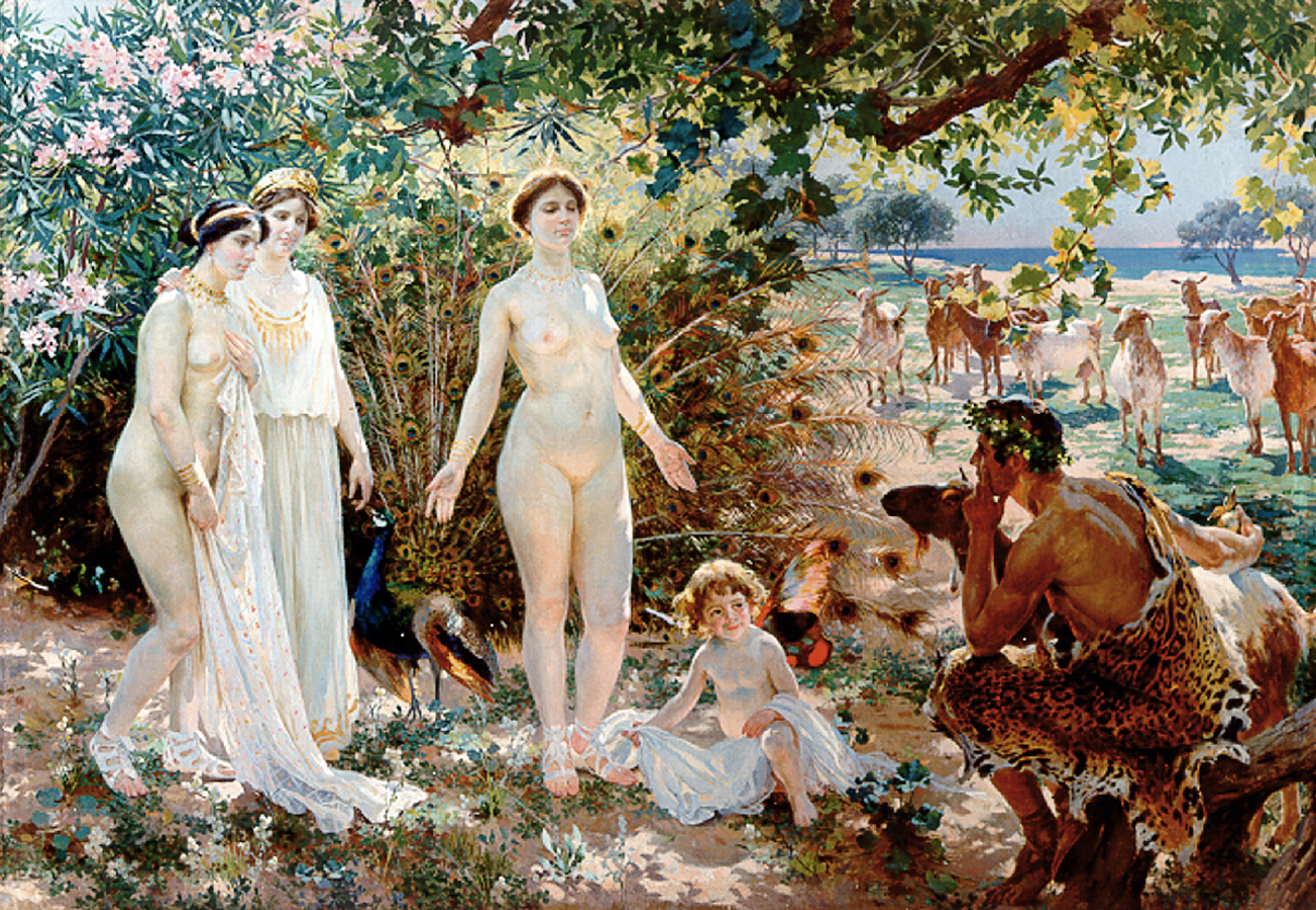
The Judgement of Paris 1904 by Simonet; depicts the Greek myth in which Paris chooses Aphrodite as the fairest woman against Athena and Hera leading to the seduction of Helen and the Trojan War

In 1901, he became professor of Studies and Forms of Nature and Art, at the School of Fine Arts in Barcelona; during this time, in 1904, he painted his masterpiece The Judgement of Paris. On August 30th of the next year, in his painting Eclipse, he depicted Northern Spain's eclipse. In 1911 he became a member of the Royal Academy of Fine Arts of San Fernando in Madrid. Again, Simonet visited and painted in Morocco. Between 1921 and 1922 he was director of the Private Paular for landscapers.

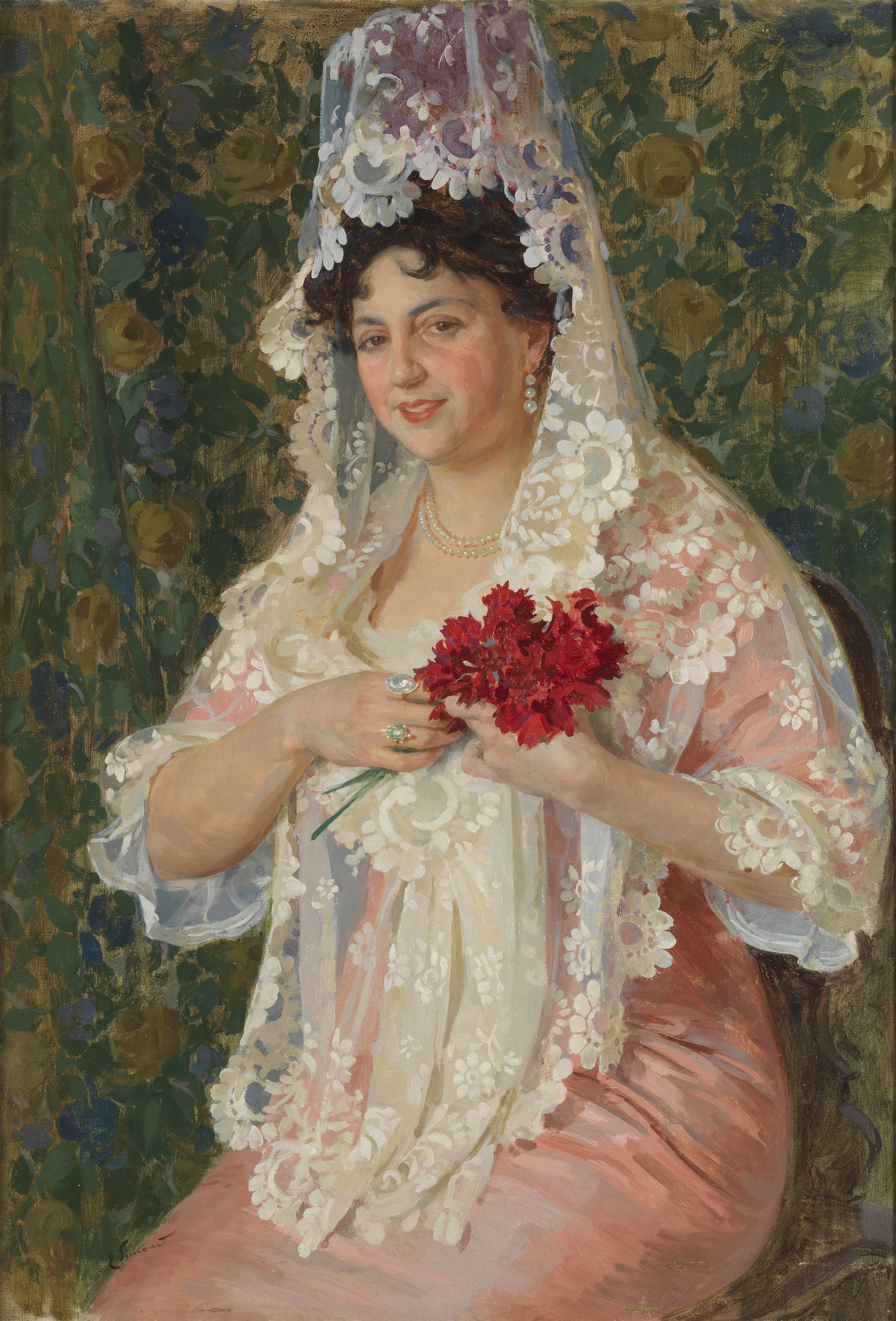
Asunción Castro Crespo, the painter's wife 1914; vibrantly depicts Simonet's cheerful and pregnant wife in a satin pink dress and lace mantilla on a floral background; fittingly presented under the title A maja

== Style ==
Like many other Spanish artists of the time, Simonet's work displays a relatively-continuous style with Spanish painting and was similarly inspired by the impressionist movement. Progressively, his works showed greater realism and attention to detail, straying away from the impressionist style. In his works made on his visits to North Africa, Simonet embraced an orientalist theme and included stereotypically Moroccan and Arabian elements in his paintings.

As seen in Asunción Castro Crespo, the painter's wife, the use of seemingly-unorthodox colors (blues, reds, and pinks) in the texture of her skin is consistent with Simonet's style.

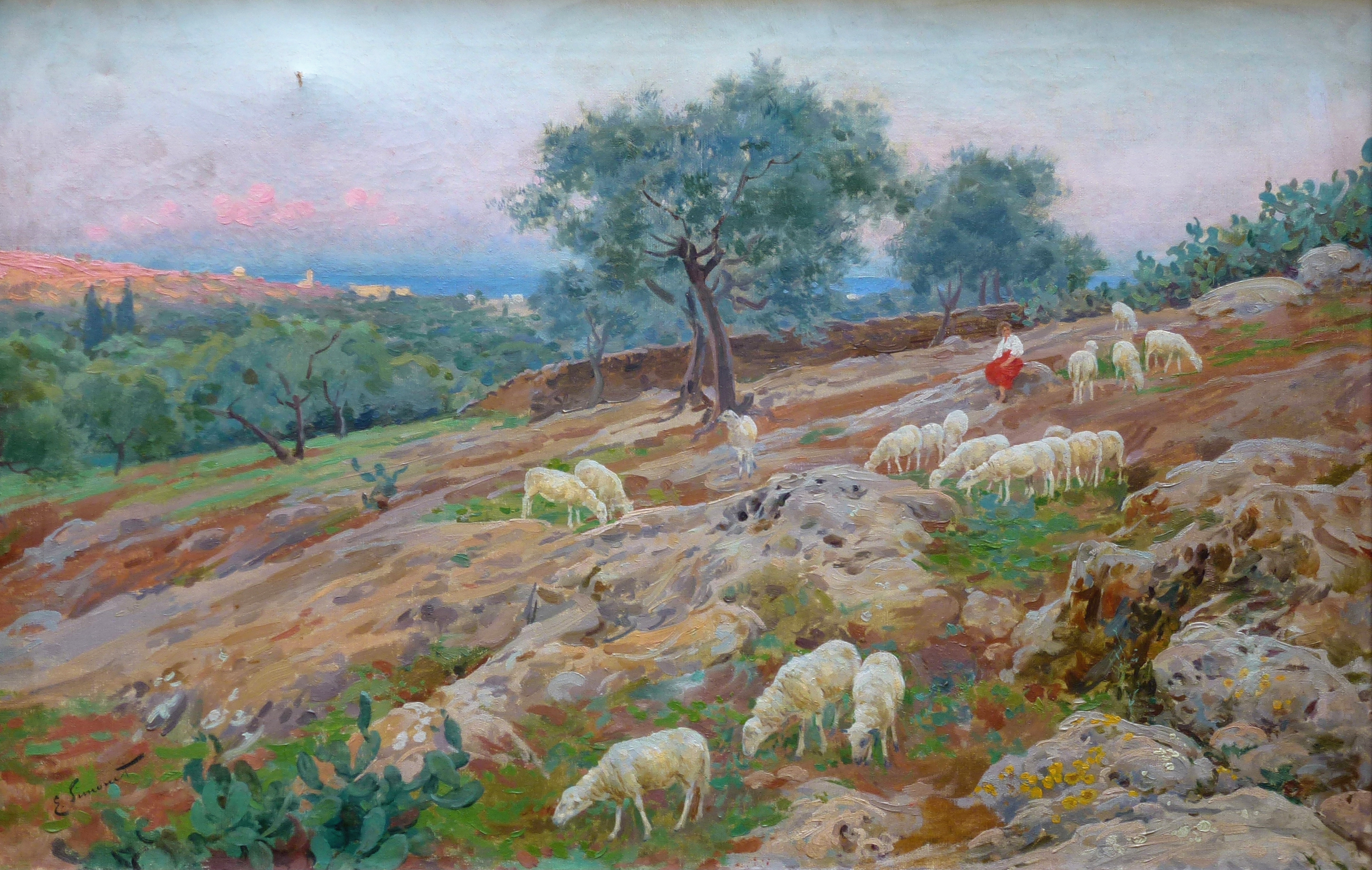
Flock of sheep (date unknown; late in his life) by Simonet; depicts a rocky pastoral landscape inland of a Mediterranean town. The brush style make greater use of flat areas of color.

Circa 1914, Simonet's style began to shift to include flatter areas of solid color and a decreased color intensity, which made his paintings look more akin to watercolors. From the end of World War I until his death, Simonet's works were dominated by landscapes of the Spanish countryside and forests.

His work often covers religious— much of which from the New Testament— subject matters. His early work reflects his early study of devotion, such as his 1891 Head of Jesus Deep in Contemplation. Some of his more famous works, The Beheading of Saint Paul and Anatomy of the Heart, are often noted for his use for dismembered body parts. The former of these aligns with Simonet's tradition of depicting gory scenes— such as with El Quite— the latter being consistent with the tradition of anatomy paintings. During his time as director, he showed his artistic ability of illustrating landscapes in works such as Cascada de La Hiruela.

Many of Simonet's work are signed with "E. Simonet" in the corner.

== Death and legacy ==
Simonet died on April 20, 1927 at 61 years old. He has paintings at Museo del Prado and Museo de Málaga. His painting The Beheading of Saint Paul is in a preferred place at the Malaga Cathedral. Since he was also devoted to decorative painting and landscape, among his surviving works which stand out are the four large canvases on Allegories of Law in the Palace of Justice in Barcelona and Allegories of the Eight Provinces in the Palace of Justice in Madrid.

== Paintings ==
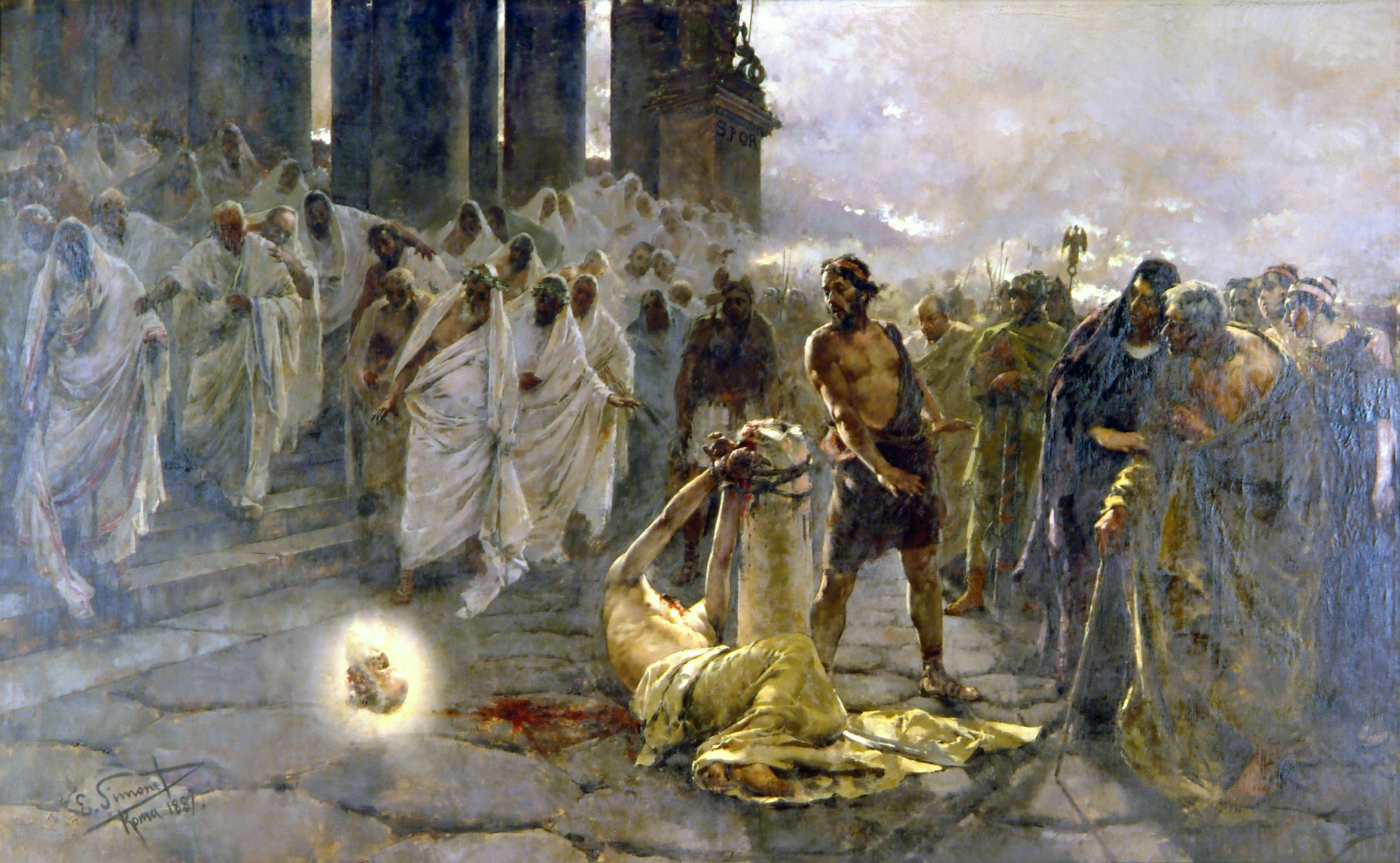
The Beheading of Saint Paul 1887; 400 x 700 cm (Málaga Cathedral)

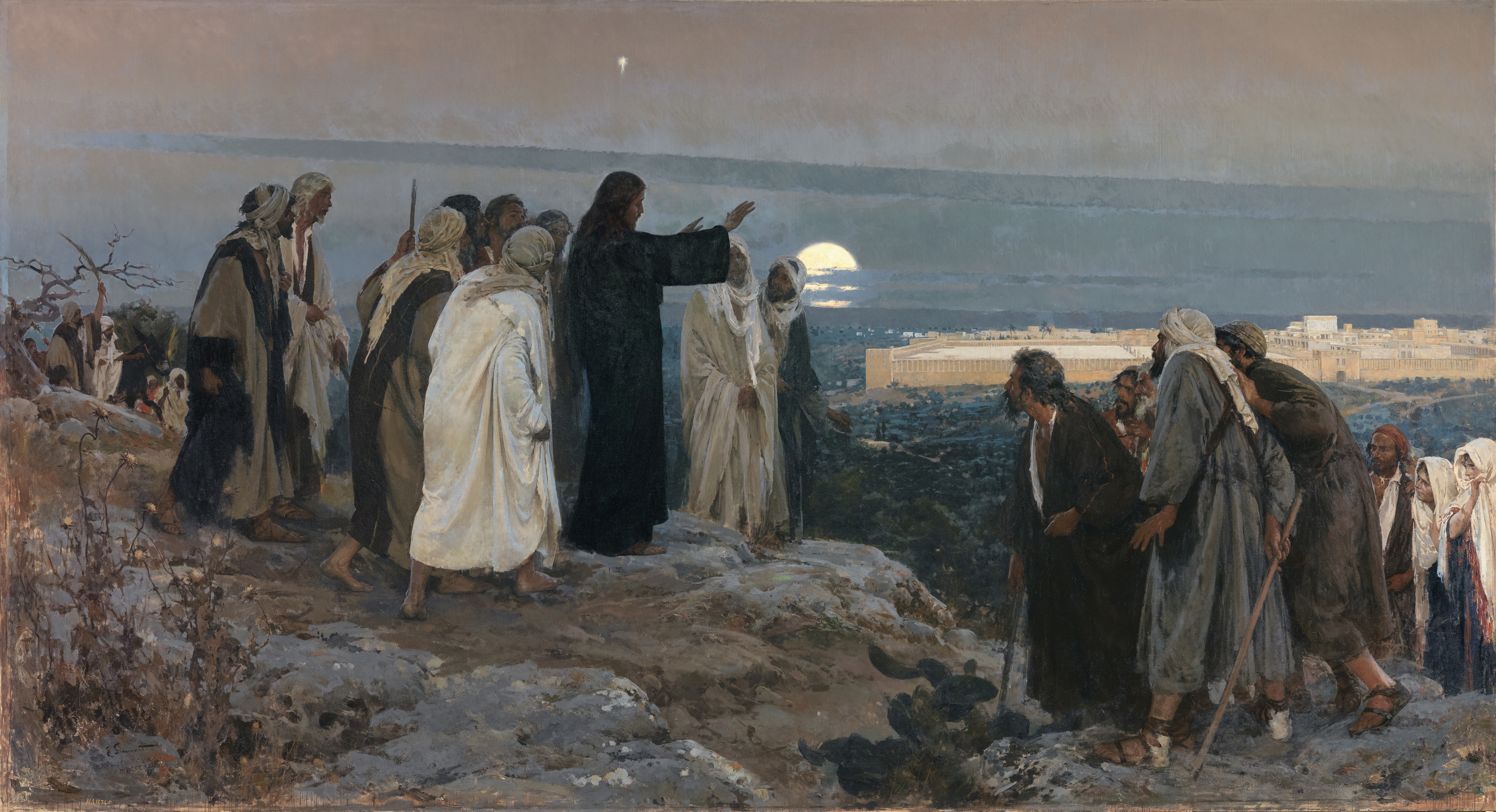
Flevit super illam (He wept over it) 1892; 305 x 555 cm (Prado Museum)

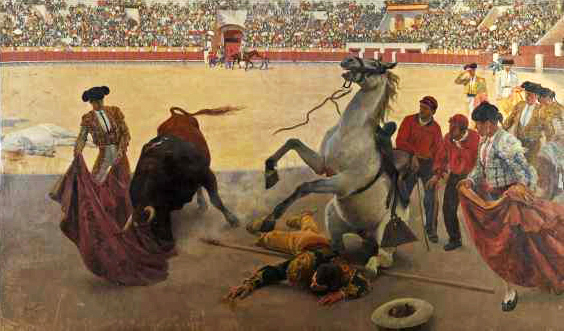
El Quite (The Removal) 1897; 269 x 483 cm (Museo de Málaga)

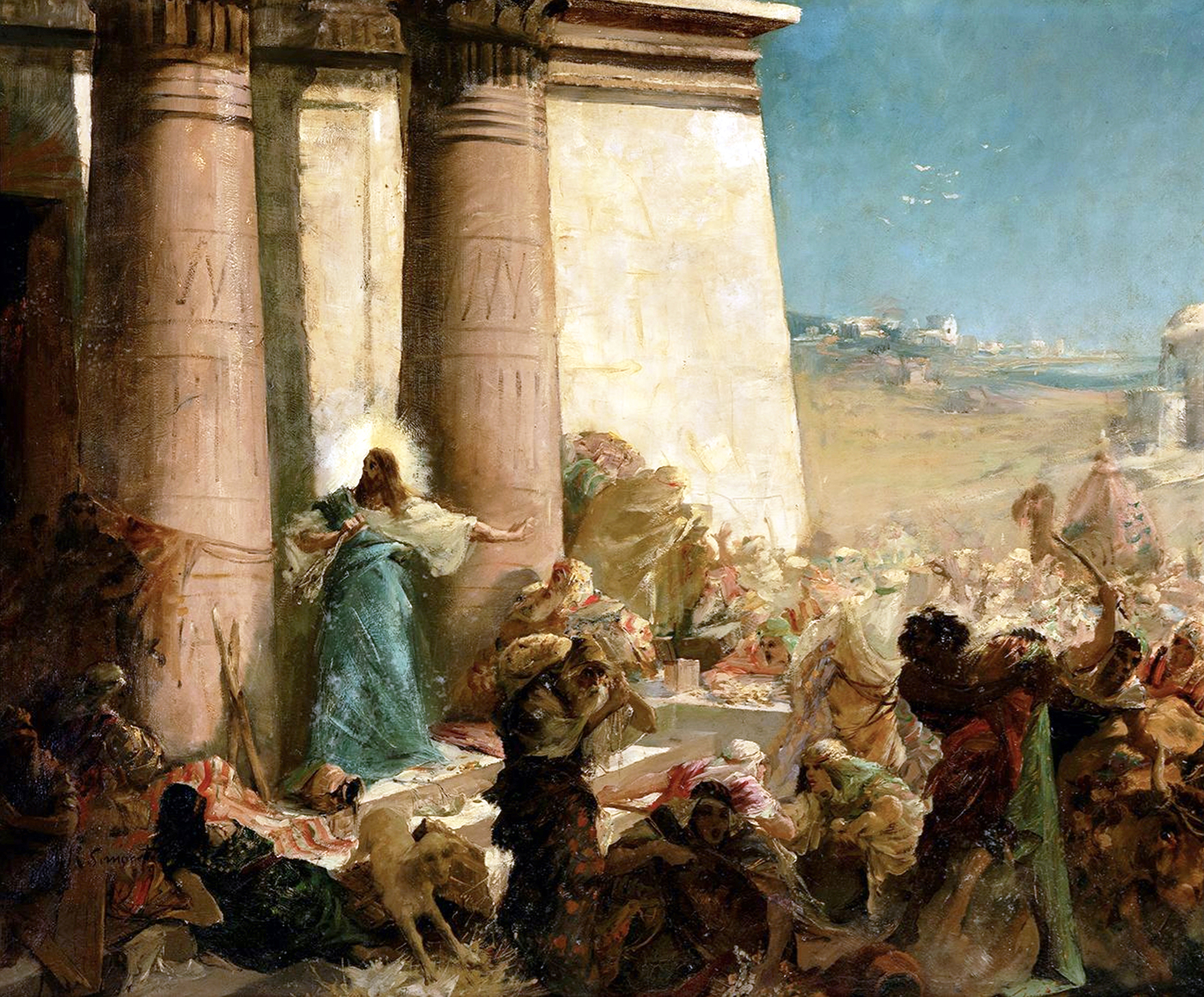
Cleansing of the Temple undated; 72 x 91 cm

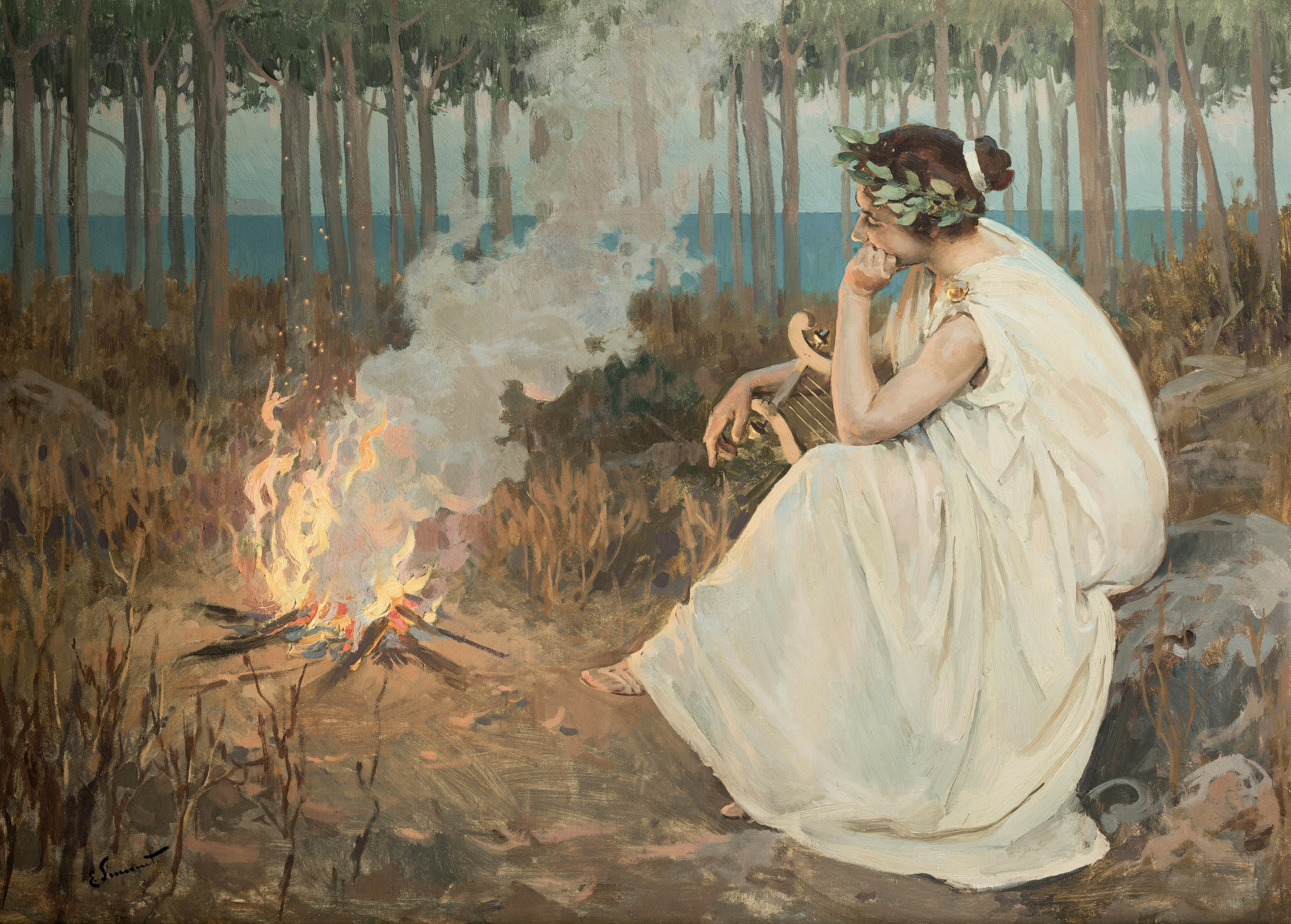
Safo de Lesbos (Sappho of Lesbos); 82 x 102 cm

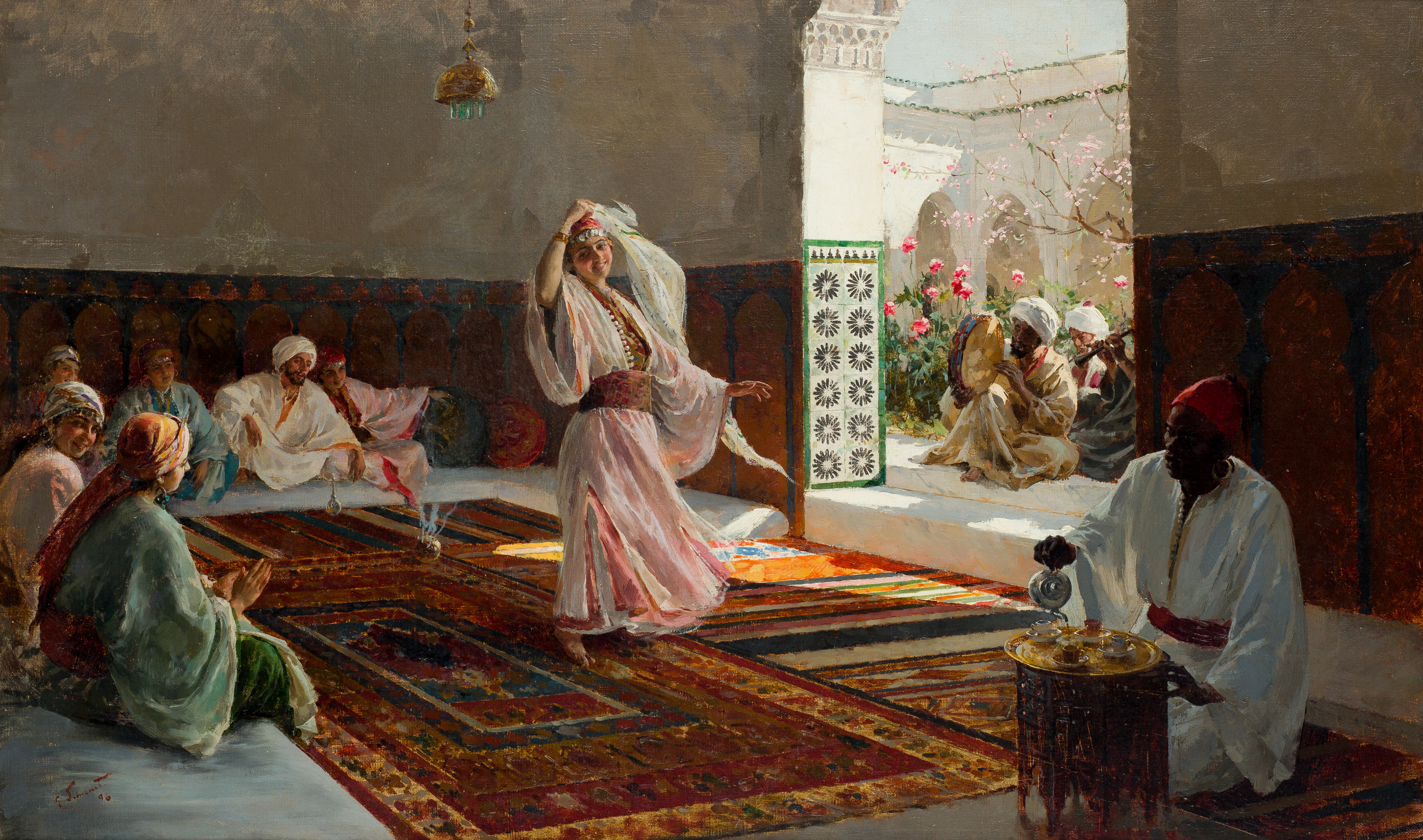
Danza de los velos (Dance of the Veils) 1896; 46 x 76 cm

== See also ==
- List of paintings by Enrique Simonet
- Judgment of Paris (Simonet)
- List of Orientalist artists
- Orientalism
