= Judgement of Paris =

Story from Greek mythology

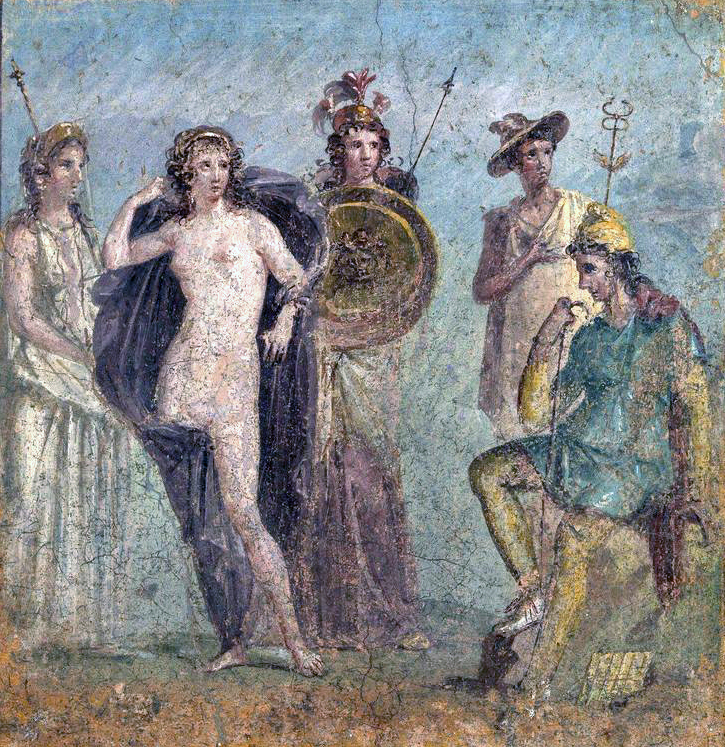
Judgement of Paris, fresco from Pompeii

The Judgement of Paris is a story from Greek mythology, which was one of the events that led up to the Trojan War, and in later versions to the foundation of Rome.

Eris, the goddess of discord, was not invited to the wedding of Peleus and Thetis. In revenge, she brought a golden apple, inscribed, "To the fairest one", which she threw into the wedding. Three guests, Hera, Athena and Aphrodite, after some disputation, agreed to have Paris of Troy choose the fairest one. Paris chose Aphrodite, she having bribed him with the most beautiful mortal woman in the world, Helen of Sparta, wife of Menelaus. Consequently, Paris carried Helen off to Troy, and the Greeks invaded Troy for Helen's return. Eris's Apple of Discord (or her not being invited to the wedding in the first place) was thus the instrumental casus belli of the Trojan War.

== Sources of the episode ==
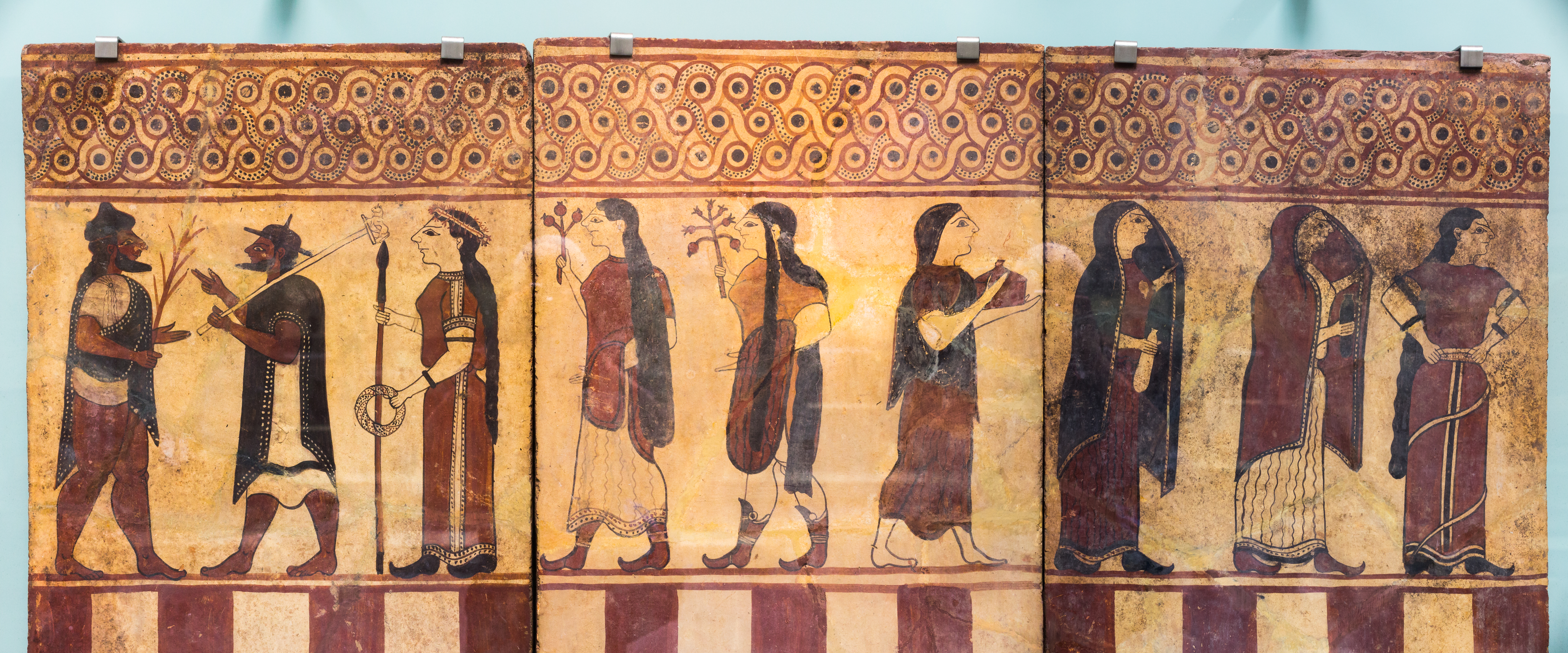
Paris receives Hermes who leads Athena, Hera and Aphrodite, four women facing to the right. Painting on terracotta panels, 560–550 BC

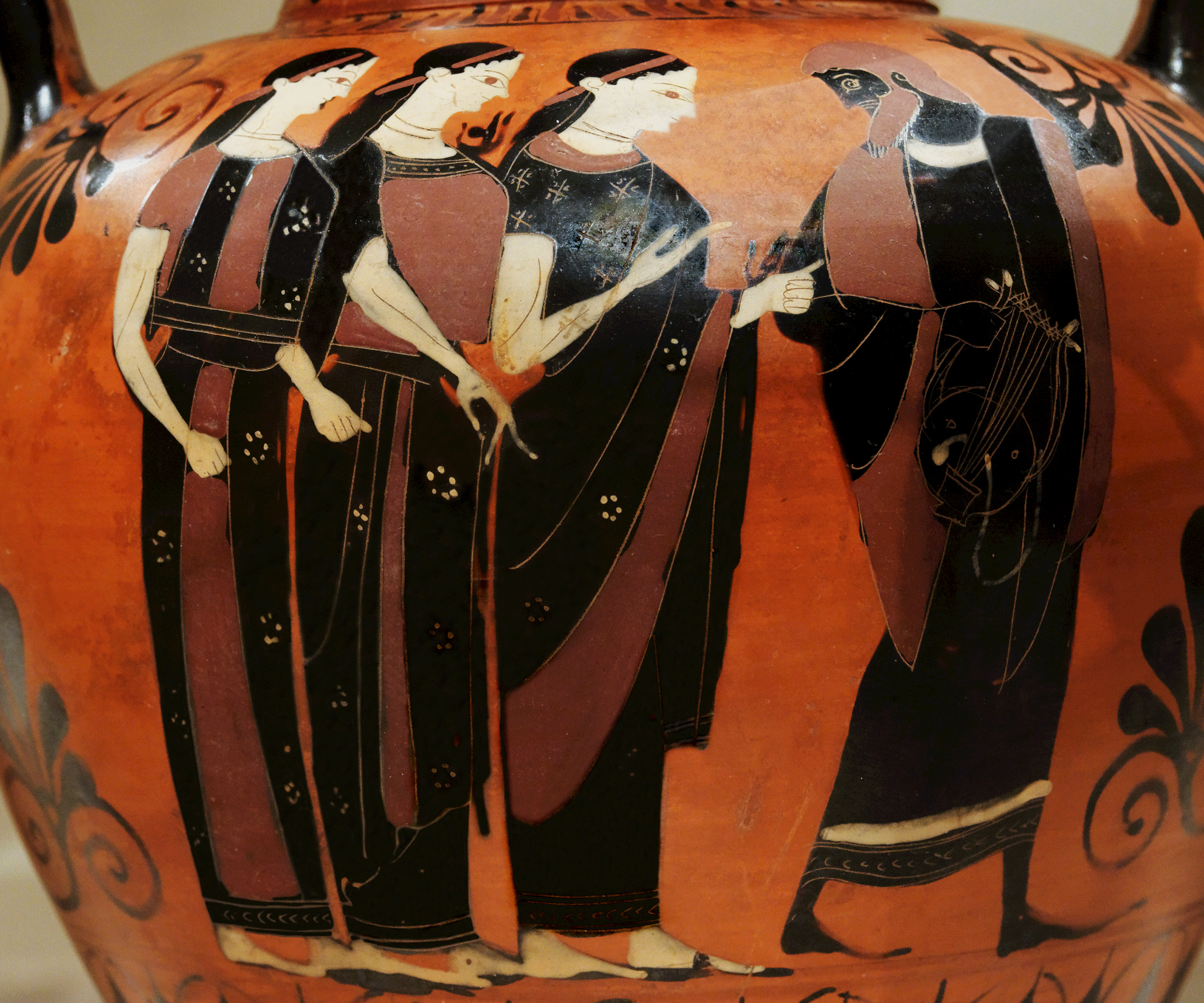
Attic black-figure neck amphora by Swing Painter (c. 540–530 BC), now in the Metropolitan Museum of Art

As with many mythological tales, details vary depending on the source. The brief allusion to the Judgement in the Iliad (24.25–30) shows that the episode initiating all the subsequent action was already familiar to its audience; a fuller version was told in the Cypria, a lost work of the Epic Cycle, of which only fragments (and a reliable summary) remain. The later writers Ovid (Heroides 16.71ff, 149–152 and 5.35f), Lucian (Dialogues of the Gods 20), Pseudo-Apollodorus (Bibliotheca, E.3.2) and Hyginus (Fabulae 92), retell the story with skeptical, ironic or popularizing agendas. It appeared wordlessly on the ivory and gold votive chest of the 7th-century BC tyrant Cypselus at Olympia, which was described by Pausanias as showing:

... Hermes bringing to Alexander [i.e. Paris] the son of Priam the goddesses of whose beauty he is to judge, the inscription on them being: 'Here is Hermes, who is showing to Alexander, that he may arbitrate concerning their beauty, Hera, Athena and Aphrodite.

An ivory comb (National Archaeological Museum, Athens. Inv. No. 15368) was found in the Sanctuary of Artemis Orthia, dated late 7th century BC, depicting Paris sitting in front of the goddesses while holding the apple.

The subject was favoured by ancient Greek vase painters as early as the sixth century BC, and remained popular in Greek and Roman art, before enjoying a significant revival as an opportunity to show three female nudes, in the Renaissance.

== Mythic narrative ==
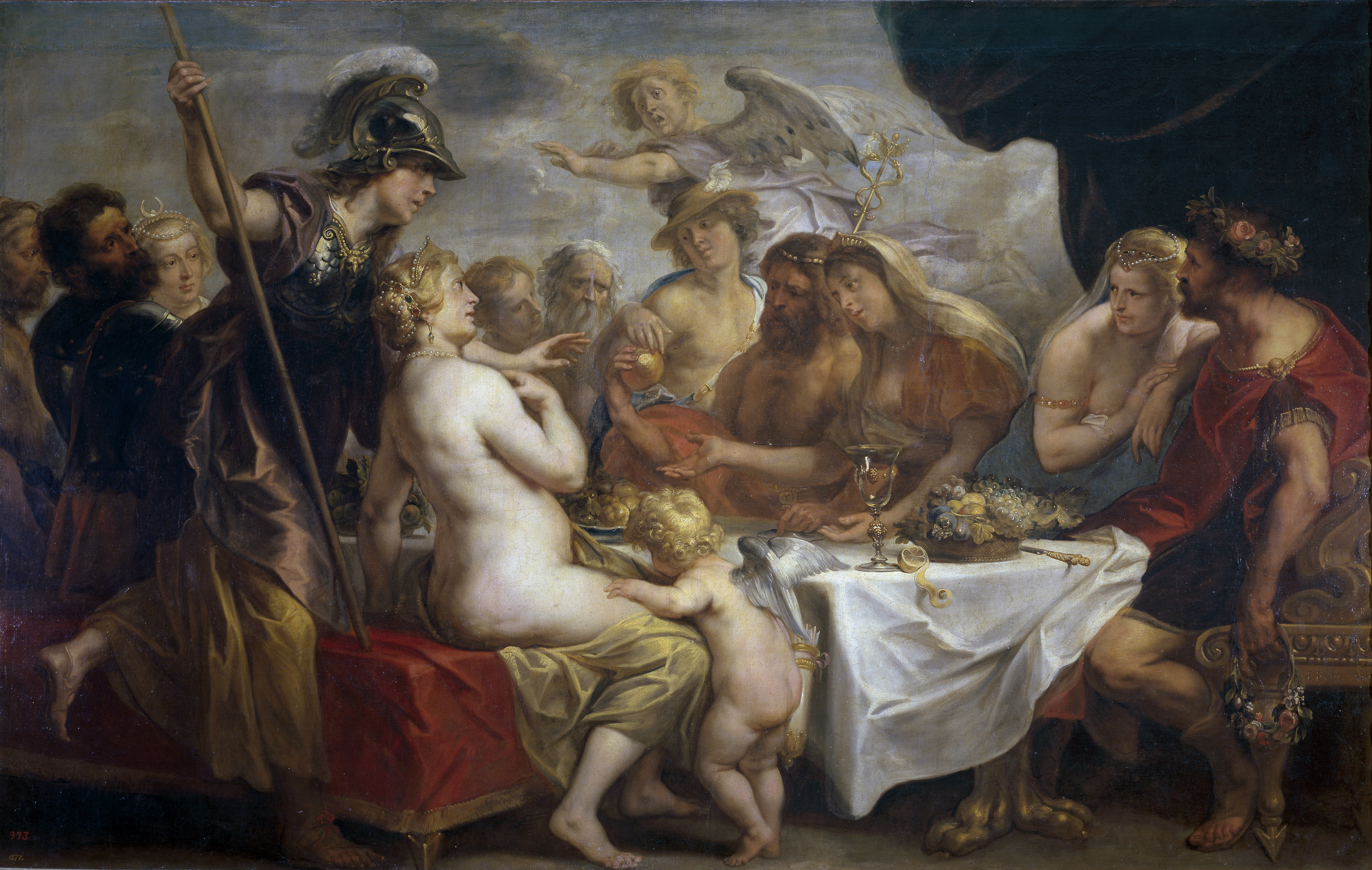
Golden Apple of Discord by Jacob Jordaens

Gaia, the personification of Earth, asked Zeus, the king of the gods, to depopulate humankind. They had become too many in number and too impious. For this reason, he planned to sow the seeds for a great war at the wedding of Thetis and Peleus.

Carl Kerényi combined several surviving accounts of the story to form the following narrative: Zeus held a banquet in celebration of the marriage of Peleus and Thetis (parents of Achilles). However, Eris, goddess of discord, was not invited, for it was believed she would have made the party unpleasant for everyone. Angered by this snub, Eris arrived at the celebration with a golden apple from the Garden of the Hesperides, which she threw into the proceedings as a prize of beauty. According to some later versions, upon the apple was the inscription καλλίστῃ (kallistēi, "To/for the fairest one").

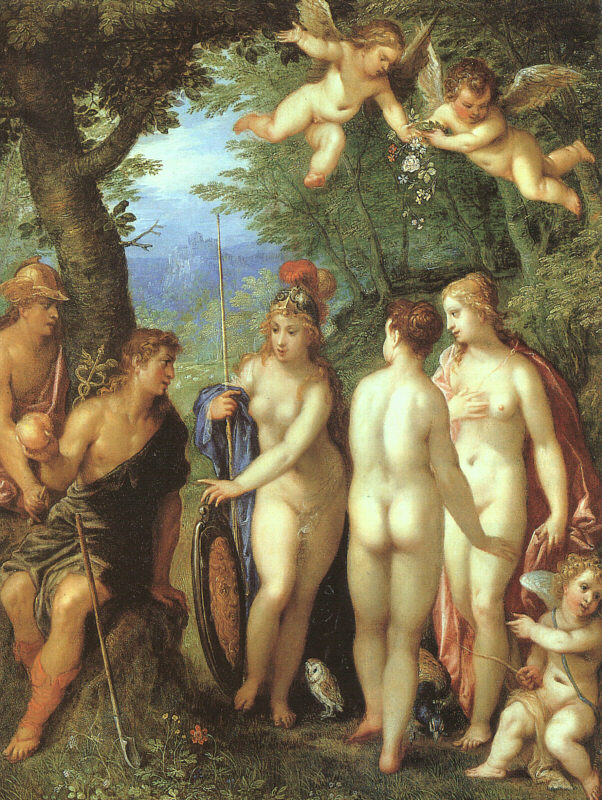
The Judgement of Paris (1599) by Hendrick van Balen the Elder. Gemäldegalerie, Berlin

Three goddesses claimed the apple: Hera, Athena and Aphrodite. They asked Zeus to judge which of them was fairest, and eventually he, reluctant to favour any claim himself, declared that Paris, a Trojan mortal, would judge their cases, for he had recently shown his exemplary fairness in a contest in which Ares in bull form had bested Paris's own prize bull, and the shepherd-prince had unhesitatingly awarded the prize to the god.

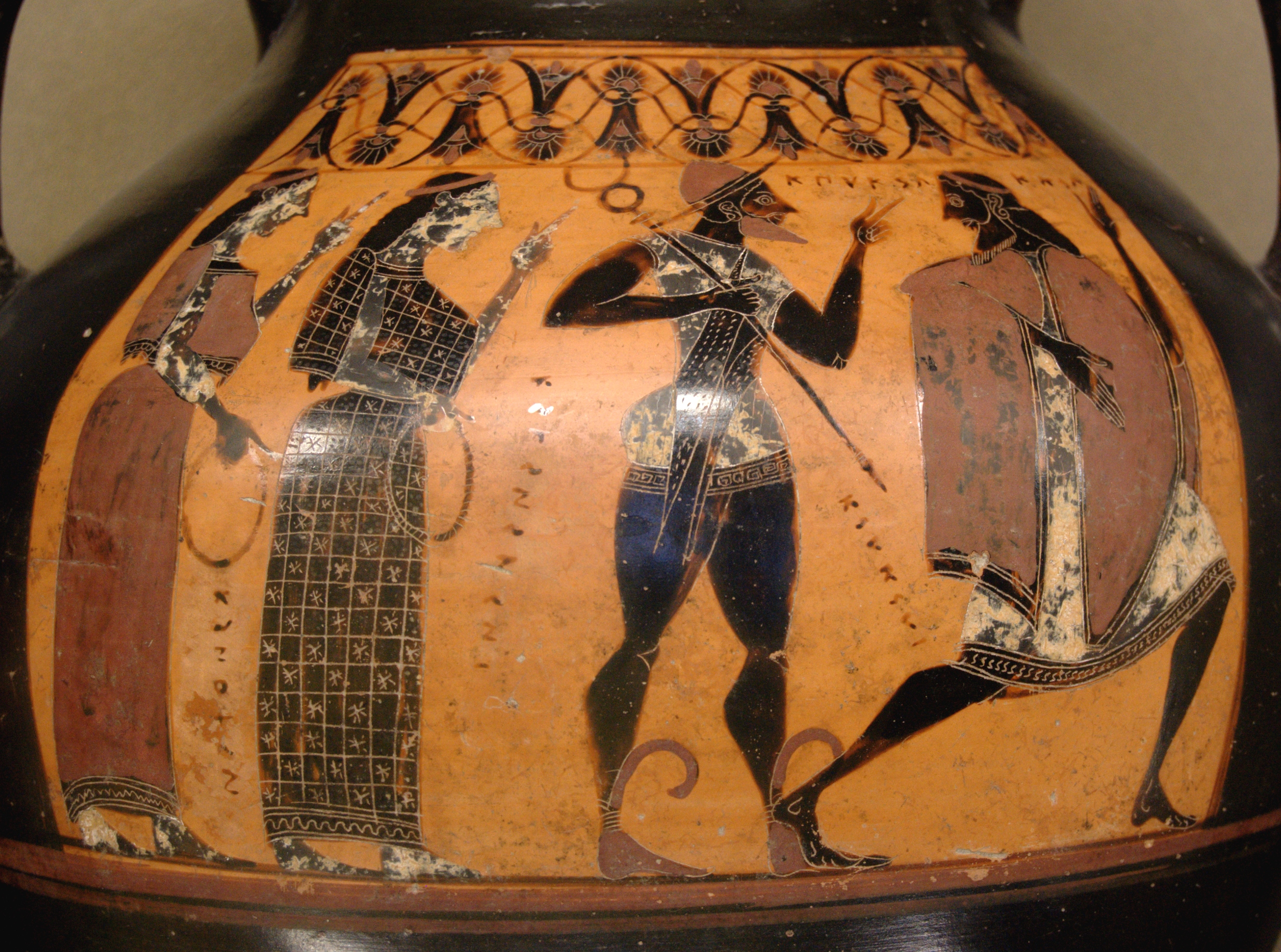
Paris fleeing from Hermes and the goddesses. Attic black-figure amphora, 560–550 BC

With Hermes as their guide, the three candidates bathed in the spring of Ida, then met Paris on Mount Ida. Paris was terrified, but Hermes told him to have no fear. Lest he refuse, the god commanded him in Zeus' name to make a judgement. While Paris inspected the goddesses, each attempted with her powers to bribe him; Hera offered to make him king of Europe and Asia (i.e. Anatolia or the Asiatic Near East), Athena offered wisdom and skill in war, and Aphrodite, who had the Charites and the Horai to enhance her charms with flowers and song (according to a fragment of the Cypria quoted by Athenagoras of Athens), offered the world's most beautiful woman (Euripides, Andromache, l.284, Helena l. 676). This was Helen of Sparta, wife of the Greek king Menelaus. Paris accepted Aphrodite's bribe and awarded the apple to her, receiving Helen as well as the enmity of the Greeks and especially of Hera. The Greeks' expedition to retrieve Helen from Paris in Troy is the mythological basis of the Trojan War. According to some stories, Helen of Troy was kidnapped by Paris and a group of Trojans; in others, she simply followed Paris willingly because she felt affection for him, too.

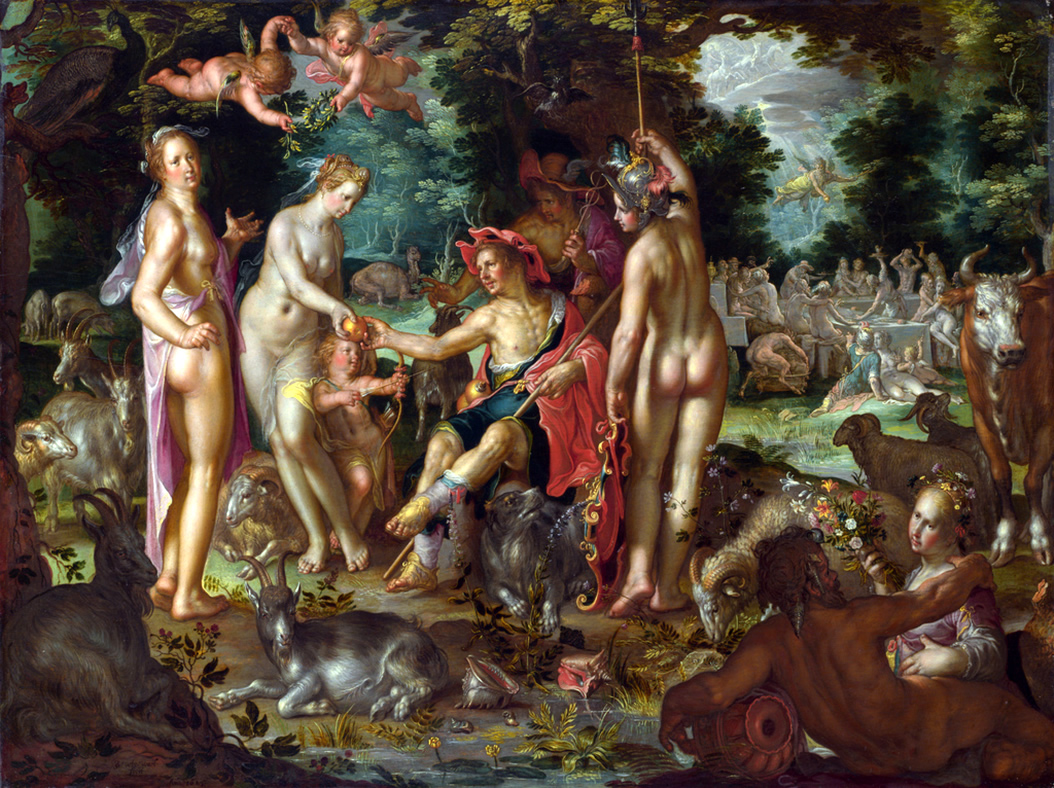
Joachim Wtewael, c. 1615, with the wedding feast of the gods in the background

According to a tradition suggested by Alfred J. Van Windekens, "cow-eyed" Hera was indeed the most beautiful, before Aphrodite showed up. However, Hera was the goddess of the marital order and of cuckolded wives, amongst other things. She was often portrayed as the shrewish, jealous wife of Zeus, who himself often escaped from her controlling ways by cheating on her with other women, mortal and immortal. She had fidelity and chastity in mind and was careful to be modest when Paris was inspecting her. Aphrodite was the goddess of sexuality, and was effortlessly more sexual and charming than any goddess. Thus, she was able to sway Paris into judging her as the fairest. Athena's beauty is rarely commented on in the myths, perhaps because Greeks held her up as an asexual being, able to "overcome" her "womanly weaknesses" to become both wise and talented in war (both considered male domains by the Greeks). Her rage at losing makes her join the Greeks in the battle against Paris's Trojans, a key event in the turning point of the war.

== In art ==
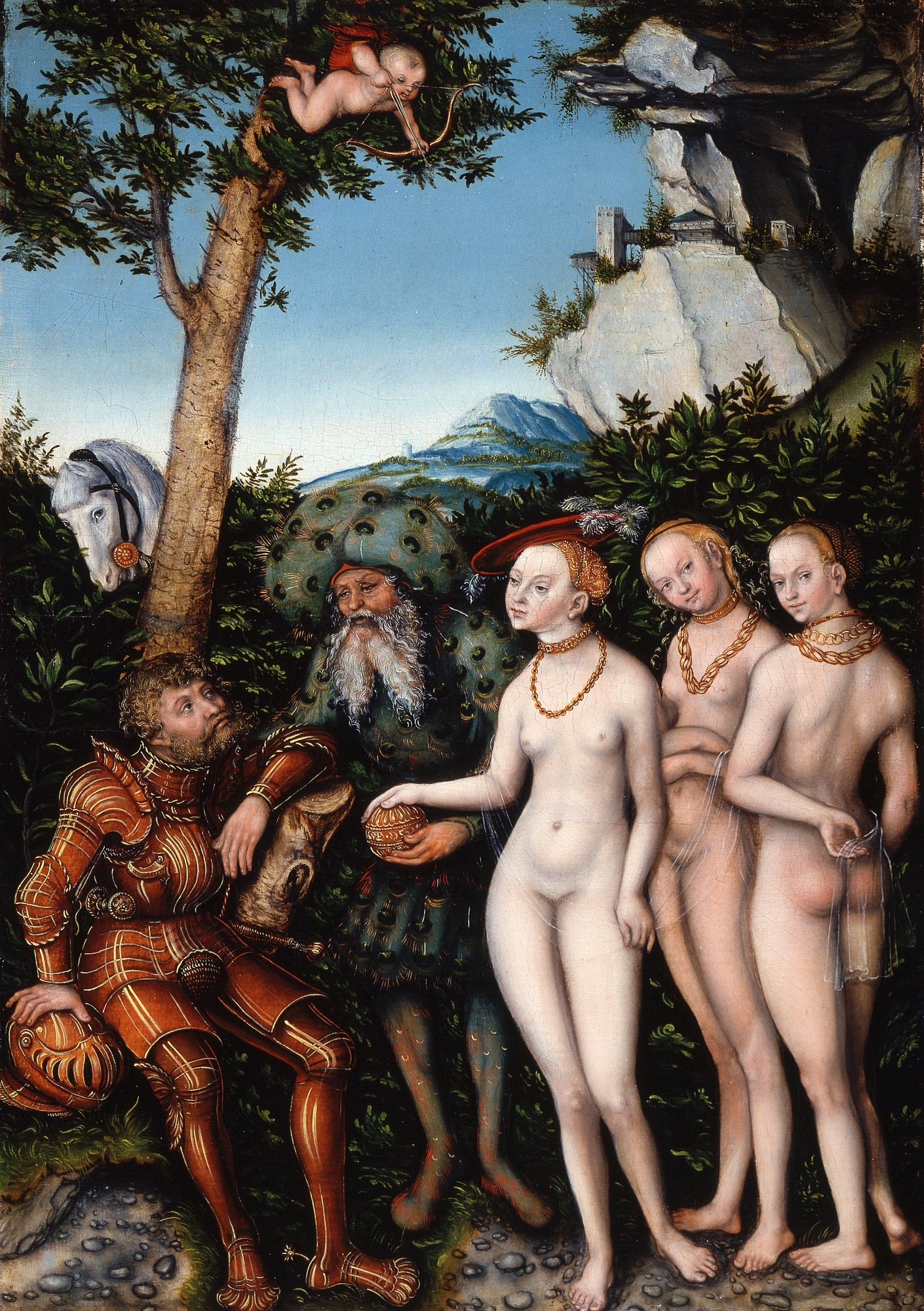
The Judgement of Paris (1530) by Lucas Cranach the Elder in the Saint Louis Art Museum

The subject became popular in art from the late Middle Ages onwards. All three goddesses were usually shown nude, though in ancient art only Aphrodite is ever unclothed, and not always. The opportunity for three female nudes was a large part of the attraction of the subject, commonly being used to allow a full appreciation of the female body by painting the goddesses from three different angles (often front, back, and side view). It appeared in illuminated manuscripts and was popular in decorative art, including 15th-century Italian inkstands and other works in maiolica, and cassoni. As a subject for easel paintings, it was more common in Northern Europe, although Marcantonio Raimondi's engraving of c. 1515, probably based on a drawing by Raphael, and using a composition derived from a Roman sarcophagus, was a highly influential treatment, which made Paris's Phrygian cap an attribute in most later versions.

The subject was painted many (supposedly 23) times by Lucas Cranach the Elder, and was especially attractive to Northern Mannerist painters. Rubens painted several compositions of the subject at different points in his career. Watteau and Angelica Kauffman were among the artists who painted the subject in the 18th century. The Judgement of Paris was painted frequently by academic artists of the 19th century, and less often by their more progressive contemporaries such as Renoir and Cézanne. Later artists who have painted the subject include André Lhote, Enrique Simonet (El Juicio de Paris 1904), and Salvador Dalí.

== In other media ==
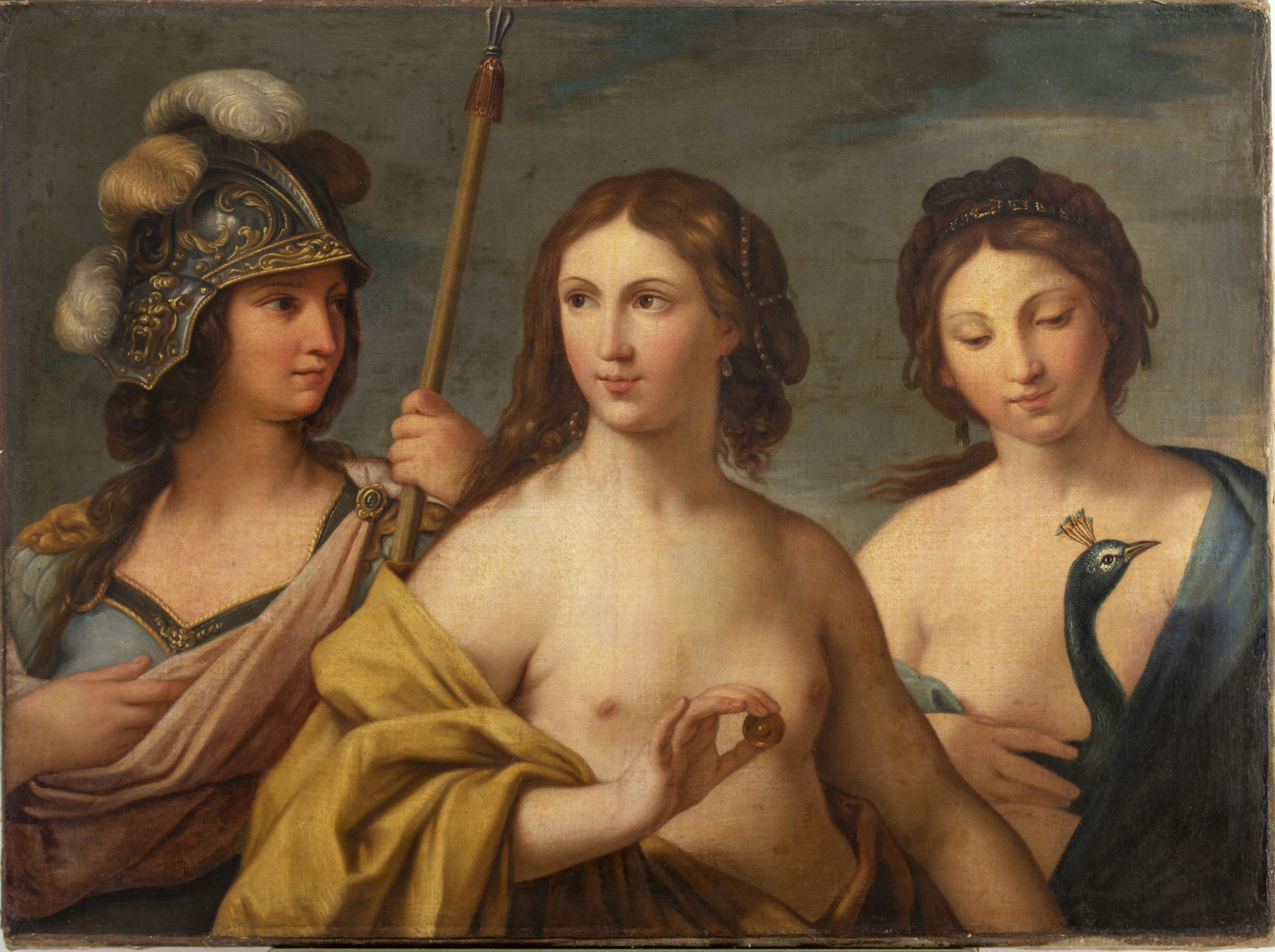
Three goddesses at the Judgement of Paris painted by Simon Vouet

The story is the basis of an opera, The Judgement of Paris, with a libretto by William Congreve, that was set to music by four composers in London, 1700–1701. Thomas Arne composed a highly successful score to the same libretto in 1742. The opera Le Cinesi (The Chinese Women) by Christoph Willibald Gluck (1754) concludes with a ballet, The Judgement of Paris, sung as a vocal quartet. Francesco Cilea's 1902 opera Adriana Lecouvreur also includes a Judgement of Paris ballet sequence.

The story is the basis of an earlier opera, Il pomo d'oro, in a prologue and five acts by the Italian composer Antonio Cesti, with a libretto by Francesco Sbarra (1611–1668).

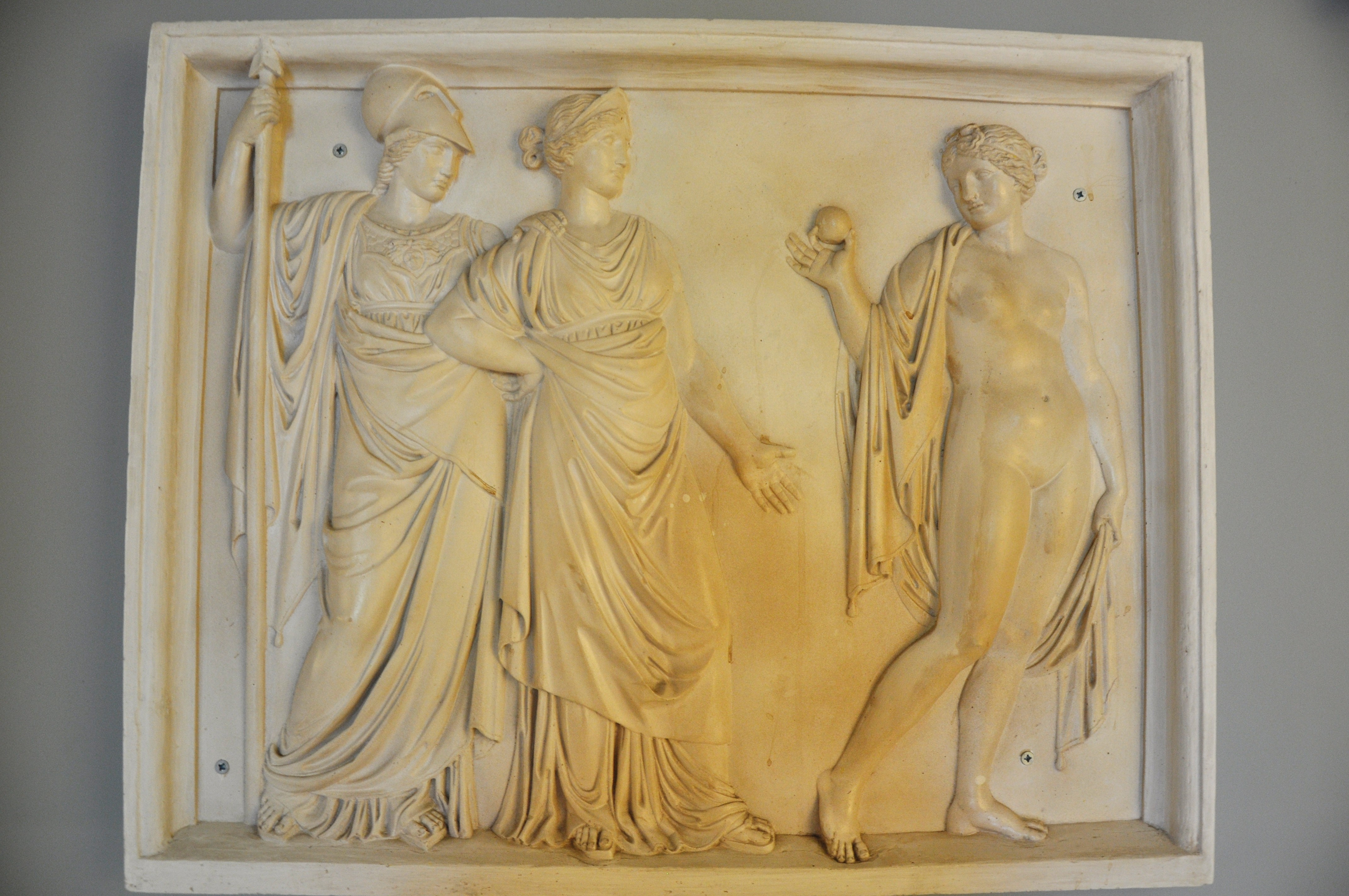
Aphrodite taunts Hera and Athena with the Apple, relief in the Achilleion, Corfu.

== In Discordianism ==
Kallistēi is the word of the ancient Greek language inscribed on Eris's Apple of Discord. In Greek, the word is καλλίστῃ (the dative singular of the feminine superlative of καλος, beautiful). Its meaning can be rendered "to the fairest one". Calliste (Καλλίστη; Mod. Gk. Kallisti) is also an ancient name for the isle of Thera.

The word Kallisti (Modern Greek) written on a golden apple, has become a principal symbol of Discordianism, a post-modernist religion. In non-philological texts (such as Discordian ones) the word is usually spelled as καλλιστι. Most versions of Principia Discordia actually spell it as καλλιχτι, but this is definitely incorrect; in the afterword of the 1979 Loompanics edition of Principia, Gregory Hill says that was because on the IBM typewriter he used, not all Greek letters coincided with Latin ones, and he didn't know enough of the letters to spot the mistake. Zeus's failure to invite Eris is referred to as The Original Snub in Discordian mythology.

== Classical literature sources ==
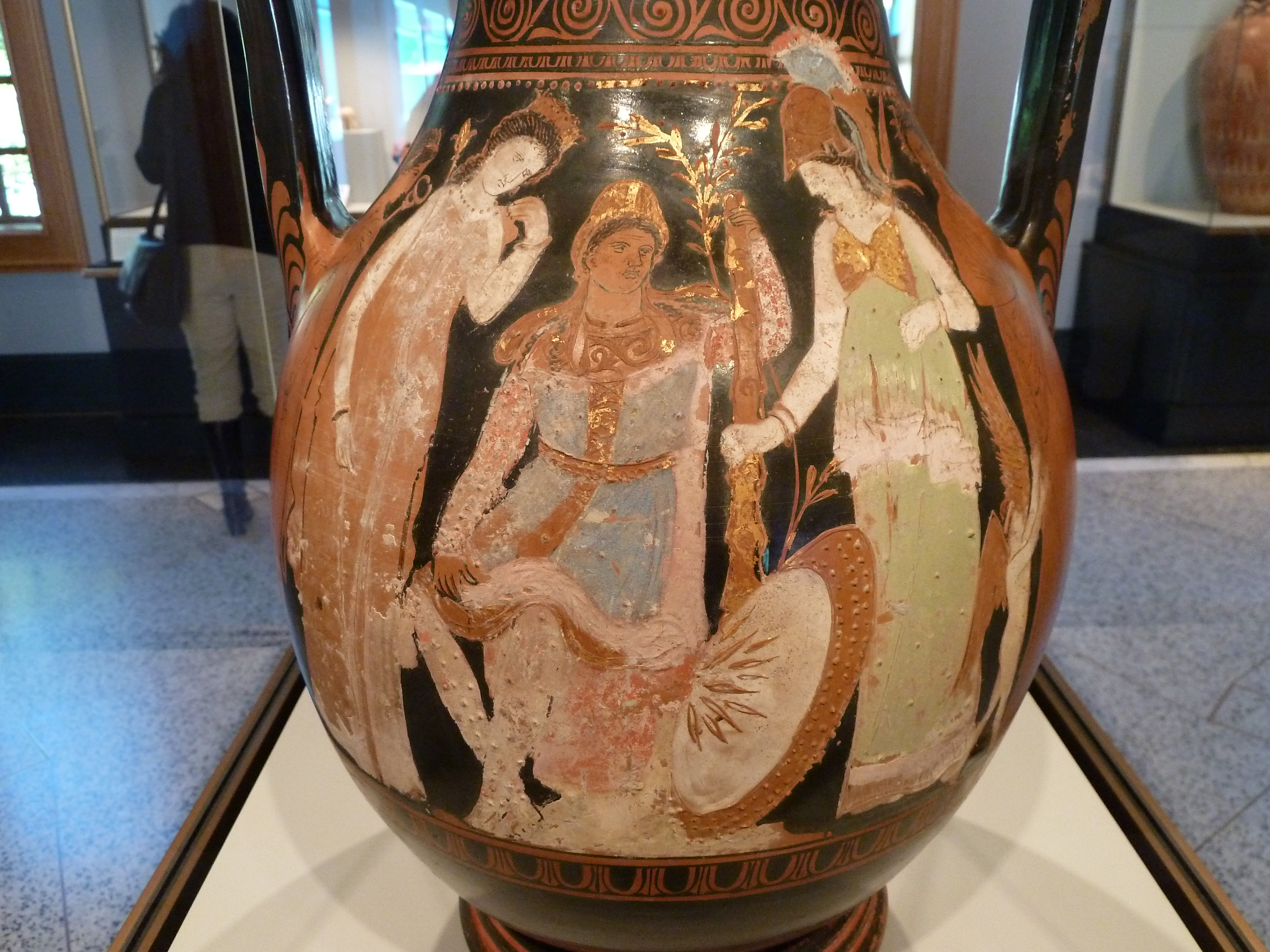
Storage jar depicting the Judgement of Paris (Athens, c. 360 BC)

Chronological listing of classical literature sources for The Judgement of Paris, including the Apple of Discord:

- Homer, Iliad 24. 25 ff (trans. Murray) (Greek epic, 8th century BC)
- Euripides, Iphigenia in Aulis 1290 ff (trans. Coleridge) (Greek tragedy, 5th century BC)
- Euripides, Hecuba 629 ff (trans. Coleridge)
- Euripides, Hecuba 669 ff
- Euripides, The Trojan Women 924 ff (trans. Coleridge)
- Euripides, Helen 20 ff (trans. Coleridge)
- Euripides, Helen 675 ff
- Euripides, Andromache 274 ff (trans. Coleridge)
- Gorgias, The Encomium on Helen 5 (The Classical Weekly, 15 February 1913, trans. Van Hook p. 123) (Greek philosophy, 5th century BC)
- P. Oxy. 663, Cratinus, Argument of Cratinus' Dionysalexandrus 2. 12–9 (trans. Grenfell & Hunt) (Greek poetry, 5th century BC)
- Scholiast on P. Oxy. 663, Argument of Cratinus' Dionysalexandrus 2. 12–9 (The Oxyrhynchus Papyri, trans. Grenfell & Hunt 1904, Vol 4, p. 70)
- Isocrates, Helen 41–52 (trans. Norlin) (Greek philosophy, 4th century BC)
- Plato, Republic 2. 379e ff (trans. Shorey) (Greek philosophy, 4th century BC)
- Scholiast on Plato, Republic 2. 379e ff (Plato The Republic Books I–V, trans. Shorey, Vol. 5, 1937 1930 p. 186)
- Aristotle, Rhetorica 1. 6. 20 ff (trans. Rhys Roberts) (Greek philosophy, 4th century BC)
- Aristotle, Rhetorica 2. 23. 12 ff
- Xenophon, Banquet (or Symposium) 4. 19. 20 ff (trans. Brownson) (Greek philosophy, 4th century BC)
- Lycophron, Alexandria 93 ff, (trans. A. Mair) (Greek epic, 3rd century BC)
- Scholiast on Alexandria 93 ff (Callimachus and Lycophron, trans. A. Mair; Aratus, trans. G. Mair, 1921, p. 501)
- Callimachus, Hymn 5. 17 ff (trans. Mair) (Greek poet, 3rd century BC)
- Herodas, Mime 1. 35 (trans. Headlam ed. Knox) (Greek poetry, 3rd century BC)
- Catullus, The Poems of Catullus 61. 17 (trans. Cornish) (Latin poetry, 1st century BC)
- Diodorus Siculus, Library of History 17. 7. 4 ff (trans. Oldfather) (Greek history, 1st century BC)
- Scholiast on Diodorus Siculus, Library of History 17. 7. 4 ff (Diodorus of Sicily, trans. Oldfather, 1963, Vol. 8, pp. 135)
- Horace, Carminum 3. 3. 19 (trans. Bennett) (Roman lyric poetry, 1st century BC)
- Scholiast on Horace, Carminum 3. 3. 19 (Horace Odes and Erodes trans. Bennett 1901 p. 312)
- Cicero, The Letters to his Friends 1. 9. 13 ff (trans. Williams) (Roman epigram, 1st century BC)
- Ovid, Heroides 16. 137 (trans. Showerman) (Roman poetry 1st century BC to 1st century AD)
- Ovid, Heroides 17. 115 ff
- Ovid, Fasti 4. 120 ff (trans. Frazer) (Roman epic, 1st century BC to 1st century AD)
- Ovid, Fasti 6. 44 ff
- Strabo, Geography 13. 1. 51 (trans. Jones) (Greek geography, 1st century BC to 1st century AD)
- Lucan, Pharsalia 9. 971 ff (trans. Riley) (Roman poetry, 1st century AD)
- Scholiast on Lucan, Pharsalia 9. 971 (The Pharsalia of Lucan, Riley, 1853, p. 378)
- Petronius, Satyricon 138 ff (trans. Heseltine) (Roman satire, 1st century AD)
- Scholiast on Petronius, Satyricon 138 ff (Petronius and Seneca Apocolocyntosis trans. Heseltine & Rouse 1925 p. 318)
- Pliny, Natural History 34. 19. 77 ff (trans. Rackham) (Roman history, 1st century AD)
- Lucian, The Carousal, or The Lapiths 35 ff (trans. Harmon) (Assyrian satire, 2nd century AD)
- Lucian, The Judgement of the Goddesses 1–16 (end) (trans. Harmon) (Assyrian satire, 2nd century AD)
- Lucian, The Dance 45 ff (trans. Harmon)
- Lucian, Dialogues of the Sea-Gods 301 ff (trans. Harmon)
- Pseudo-Lucian, Charidemus 10 ff (trans. Macleod)
- Pseudo-Apollodorus, Epitome 3. 3 (trans. Frazer) (Greek mythography, 2nd century AD)
- Scholiast on Pseudo-Apollodorus, Epitome 3. 3 (Apollodorus The Library, trans. Frazer, 1921, Vol. 2, pp. 172–73)
- Pseudo-Hyginus, Fabulae 92 (trans. Grant) (Roman mythography, 2nd century AD)
- Pausanias, Description of Greece 3. 18. 12 ff (trans. Frazer) (Greek travelogue, 2nd century AD)
- Pausanias, Description of Greece 5. 19. 5 ff
- Apuleius, The Golden Ass 4. 30 ff (trans. Adlington & Gaselee) (Latin prose, 2nd century AD)
- Apuleius, The Golden Ass 10. 30–33 (trans. Adlington & Gaselee)
- Longus, Daphnis and Chloe Book 3 (The Athenian Society's Publications IV: Longus 1896 p. 108) (Greek romance, 2nd century AD)
- P. Oxy. 1231, Sappho, Book 1 Fragment 1. 13 ff (The Oxyrhynchus Papyri, trans. Grenfell & Hunt, 1914, Vol. 10, p. 40) (Greek poetry, 2nd century AD)
- Clement of Alexandria, Exhortation to the Greeks 2. 29 P. ff (trans. Butterworth) (Christian philosophy, 2nd to 3rd centuries AD)
- Tertullian, Apologeticus 15. 15 ff (trans. Souter & Mayor) (Christian philosophy C2nd to C3rd centuries AD)
- Athenaeus, Banquet of the Learned 12. 2 (trans. Yonge) (Greek rhetoric, 2nd to 3rd AD)
- Psudeo-Proclus, Cypria (Hesiod the Homeric Hymns and Homerica trans. Evelyn-White pp. 488–91) (2nd to 5th centuries AD)
- Colluthus, The Rape of Helen 59–210 (trans. Mair) (Greek epic, 5th to 6th centuries AD)
- Scholiast on Colluthus, The Rape of Helen 59 ff (Oppian Colluthus Tryphiodorus, trans. Mair, 1928, pp. 546–47)
- Servius, Servius In Vergilii Aeneidos 1. 27 ff (trans. Thilo) (Greek commentary, 4th to 11th centuries AD)
- First Vatican Mythographer, Scriptores rerum mythicarum 208 (ed. Bode) (Greek and Roman mythography 9th AD to 11th centuries AD)
- Second Vatican Mythographer, Scriptores rerum mythicarum 205 (ed. Bode) (Greek and Roman mythography 11th century AD)
- Tzetzes, Scholia on Lycophron Cassandra (or Alexandria) 93 (Scholia on Lycophron, ed. Müller, 1811, p. 93) (Byzantine commentary, 12th century AD)

== See also ==
- Feast of the Gods (art)
- Trojan War
