= El Juicio de Paris (Simonet) =

Painting by Enrique Simonet

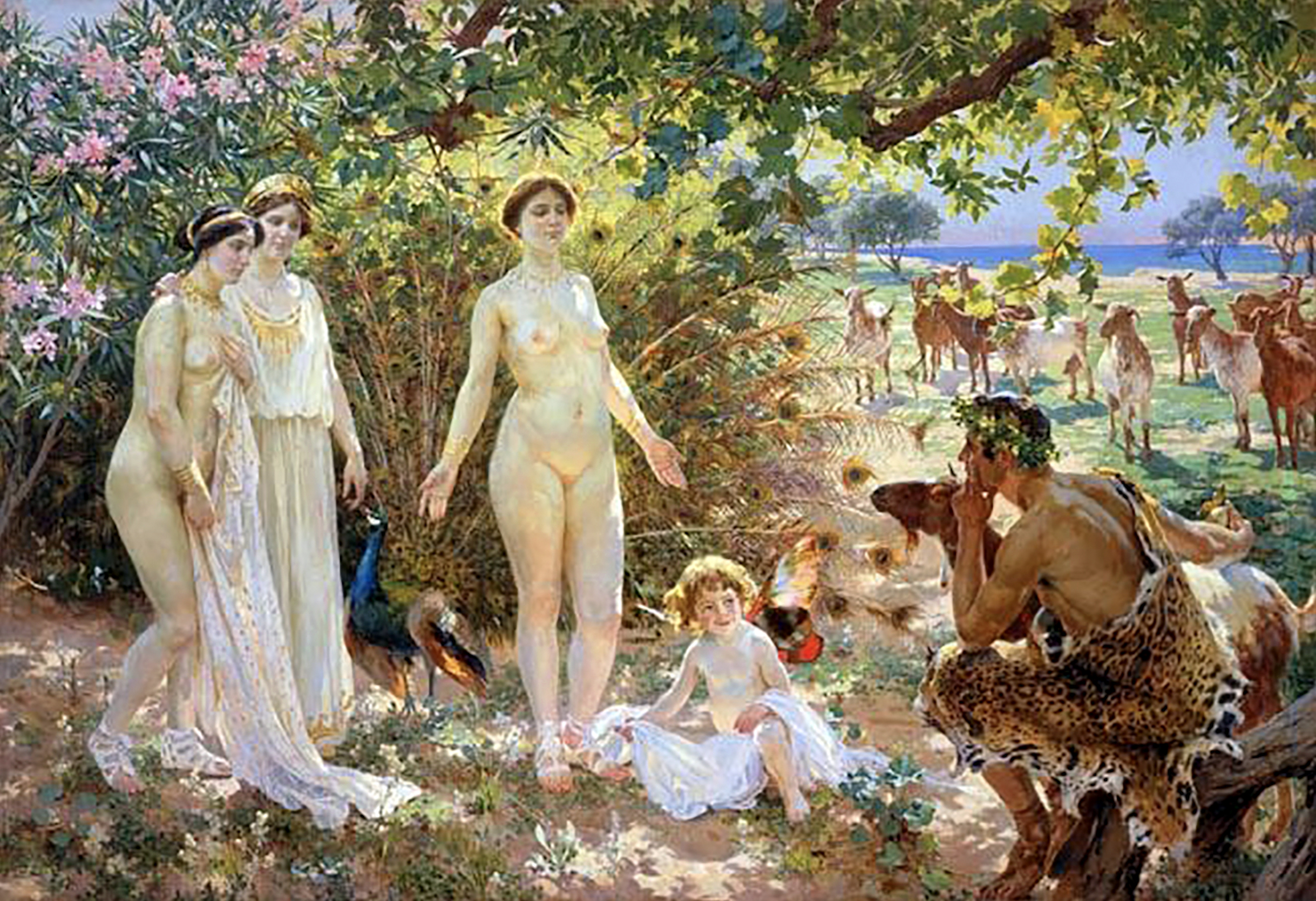
- Artist: Enrique Simonet
- Year: 1904
- Medium: Oil on canvas
- Dimensions: 215 cm × 331 cm (85 in × 130 in)
- Location: Museo de Málaga; Málaga

El Juicio de Paris (The Judgment of Paris in English) is an oil-on-canvas painting of the Greek myth, the Judgement of Paris. It depicts the three goddesses naked and Paris deciding whom he should give the apple to. It was executed in 1904 by Enrique Simonet, a Spanish painter, and is one of the many works depicting the scene. The composition is 3.31 by 2.15 metres (10.9 by 7.1 ft). It is owned by heirs of Simonet, and is in the Museo de Málaga.

== See also ==
- The Judgement of Paris (Rubens)
