= The Judgement of Paris (Rubens) =

Several paintings by Peter Paul Rubens

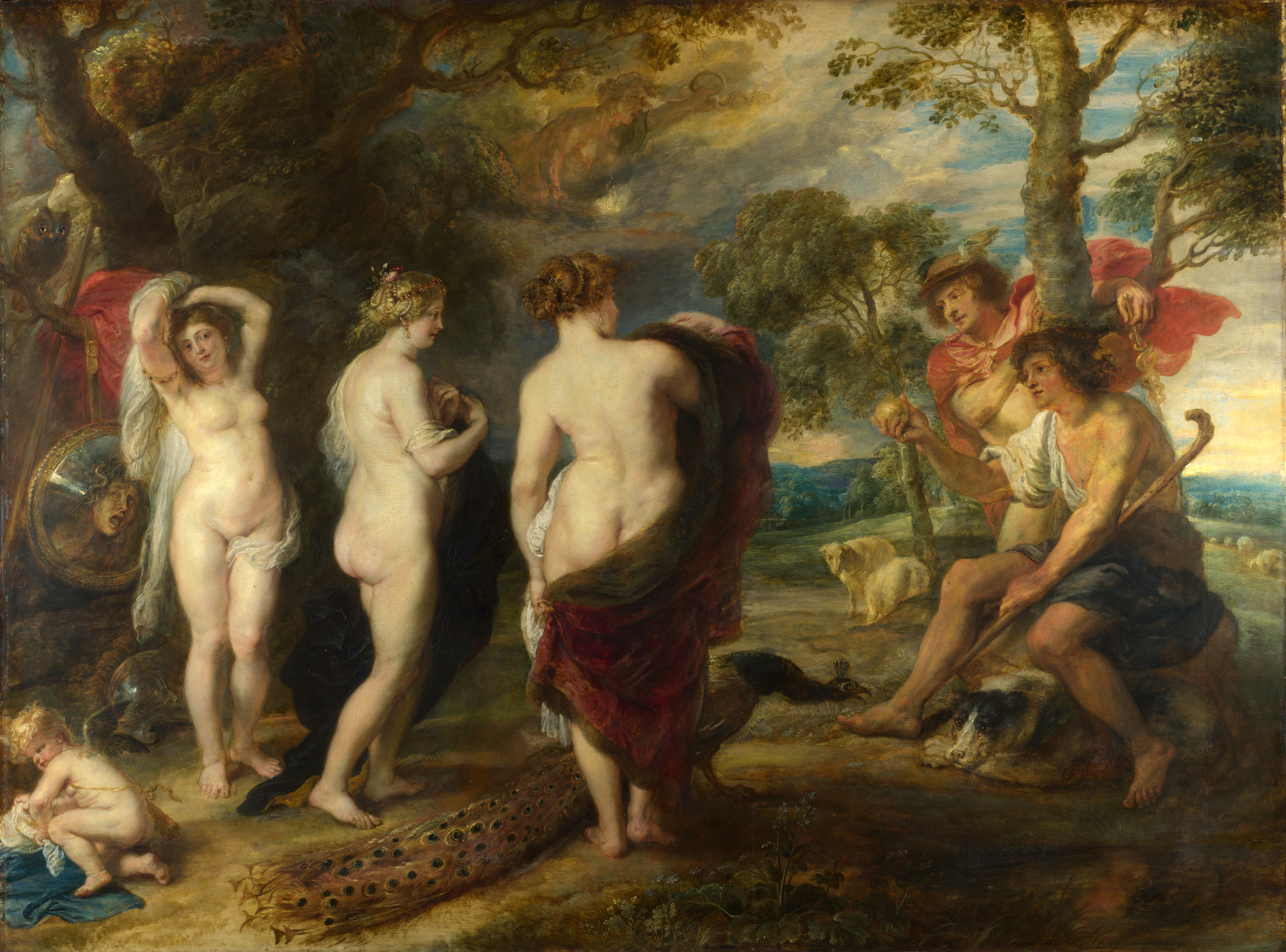
- Artist: Peter Paul Rubens
- Year: c. 1636
- Dimensions: 144.8 cm × 193.7 cm (57.0 in × 76.3 in)
- Location: National Gallery; London

The Judgement of Paris
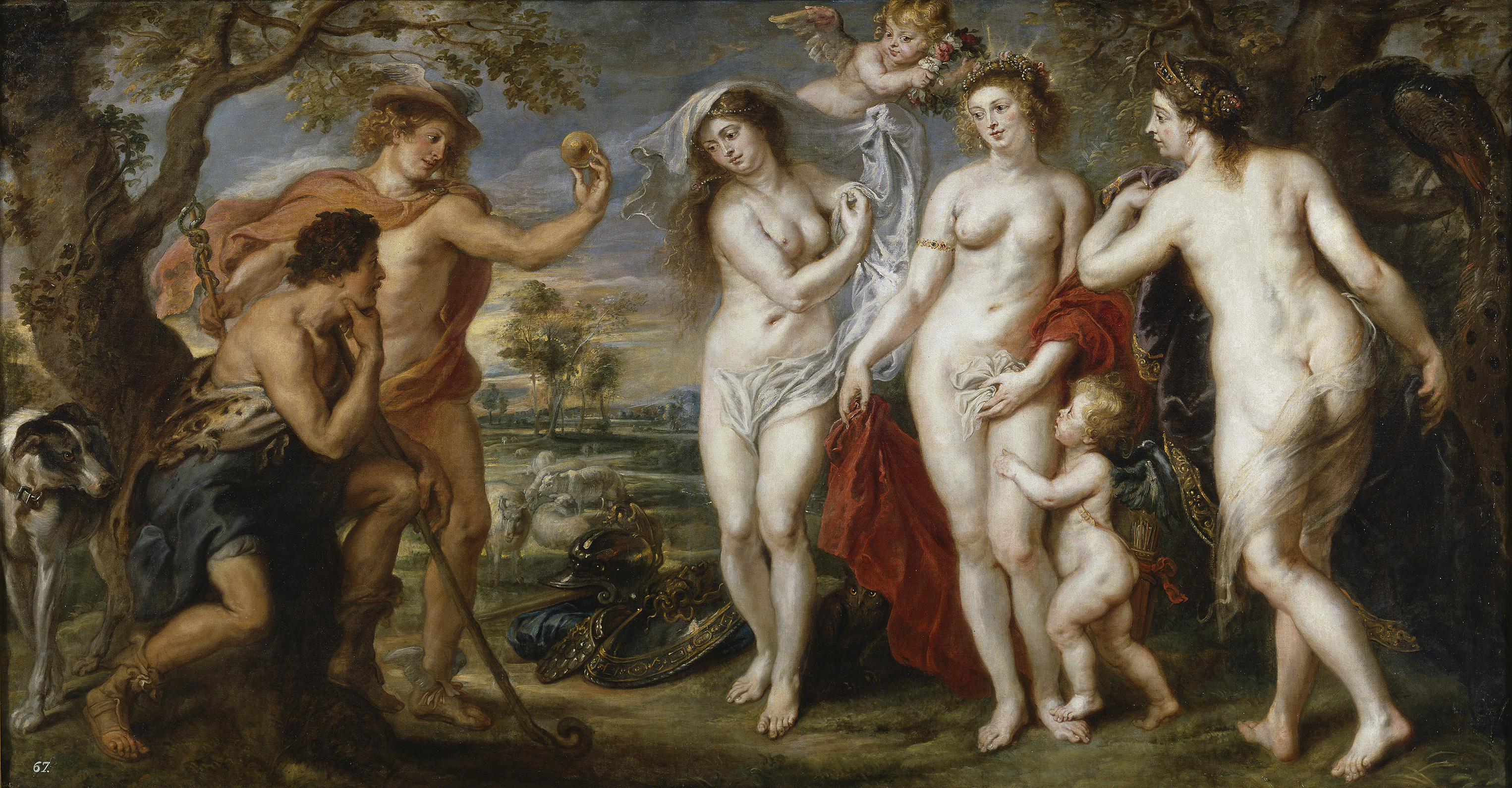
- Artist: Peter Paul Rubens
- Year: 1638-1639
- Dimensions: 199 cm × 379 cm (78 in × 149 in)
- Location: Museo del Prado; Madrid

The Judgement of Paris refers to any of the several paintings of the Judgement of Paris produced by Peter Paul Rubens (1577–1640), though he did not match the 22 depictions of the subject attributed to Lucas Cranach the Elder (c. 1472–1553). There were versions before about 1606, then he returned to the subject thirty years later; all take the opportunity to show nude females from different angles.

The large versions of 1636 in London and 1639 in Madrid are among the best known. These both show Rubens' version of idealised feminine beauty, with the goddesses Aphrodite, Athena and Hera on one side and Paris accompanied by Hermes on the other. The 1636 version has a depiction of Cupid at the far left and Alecto above the goddesses, whilst the 1639 version adds a Cupid between Hera (far right) and Aphrodite (centre).

Paris is a misplaced Trojan prince working as a shepherd, and is accompanied by his sheepdog; his sheep are seen behind the figures in these late paintings.

== 1636 version ==
This version follows the story as narrated in Lucian's 'Judgement of the Goddesses'. It shows the award of the golden apple, though alterations show Rubens first painted an earlier point in the story, when the goddesses are ordered to undress by Mercury. This had been shown in at least one of the early group (now in the Prado), with putti pulling off the goddess' clothes. The painting was bought for the National Gallery in London in 1844.

There is a similar version, also of 1636 (perhaps the first to be painted), in the Gemäldegalerie Alte Meister, Dresden. This is less than half the size, and has three putti rather than one.

== 1638 version ==
Painted in 1638 or '39, this version is now in the Prado in Madrid and was completed shortly before his death while he was ill with gout. It was commissioned by Philip IV of Spain's brother Cardinal-Infante Ferdinand of Austria and on Ferdinand's death moved to the Spanish royal collection. In 1788 Charles III of Spain decided it was immodest and ordered it to be burned, but he died before that order could be carried out.

== Other versions ==
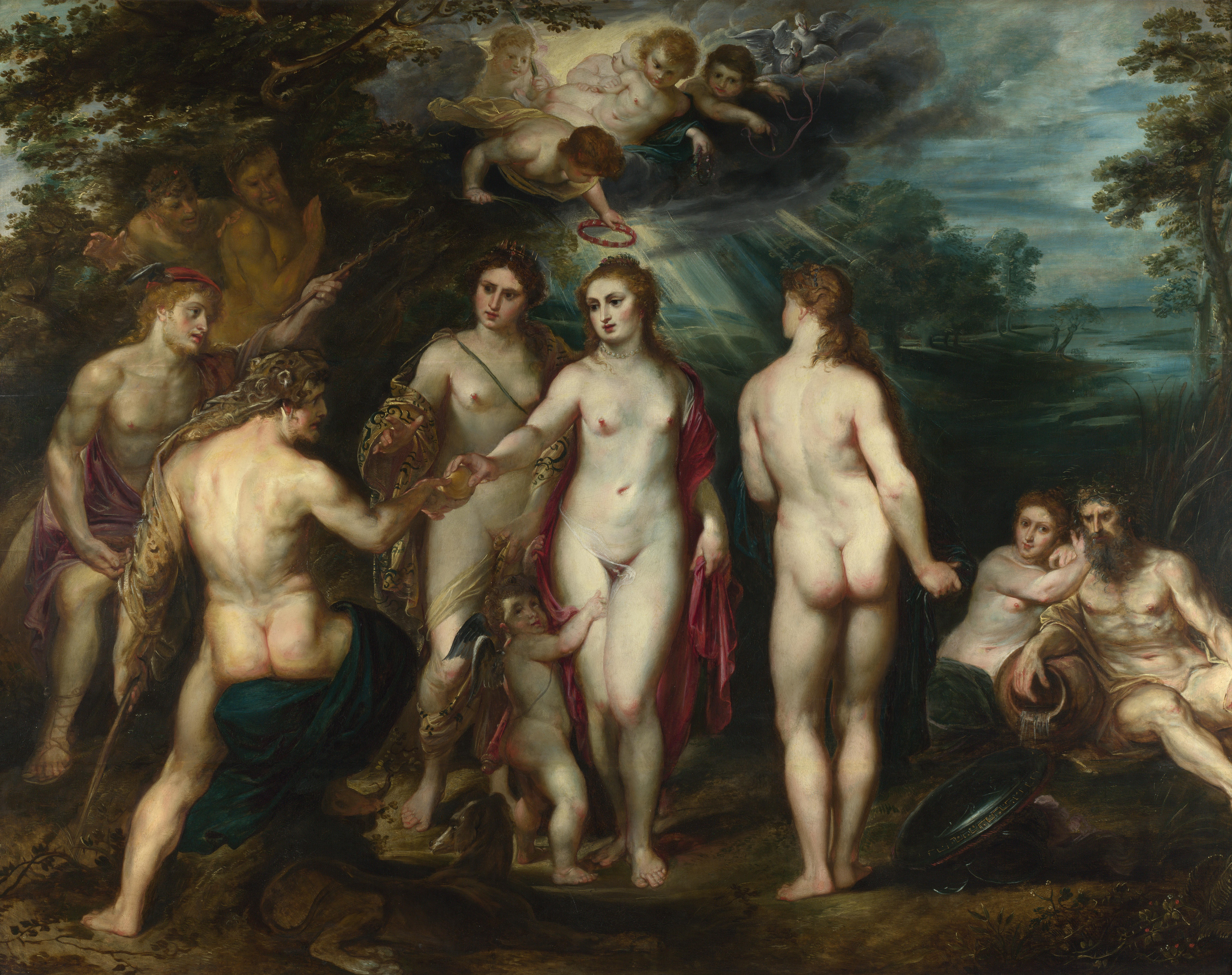
1597-1600, 144.8 cm (57 in) x 193.7 cm (76.2 in), National Gallery

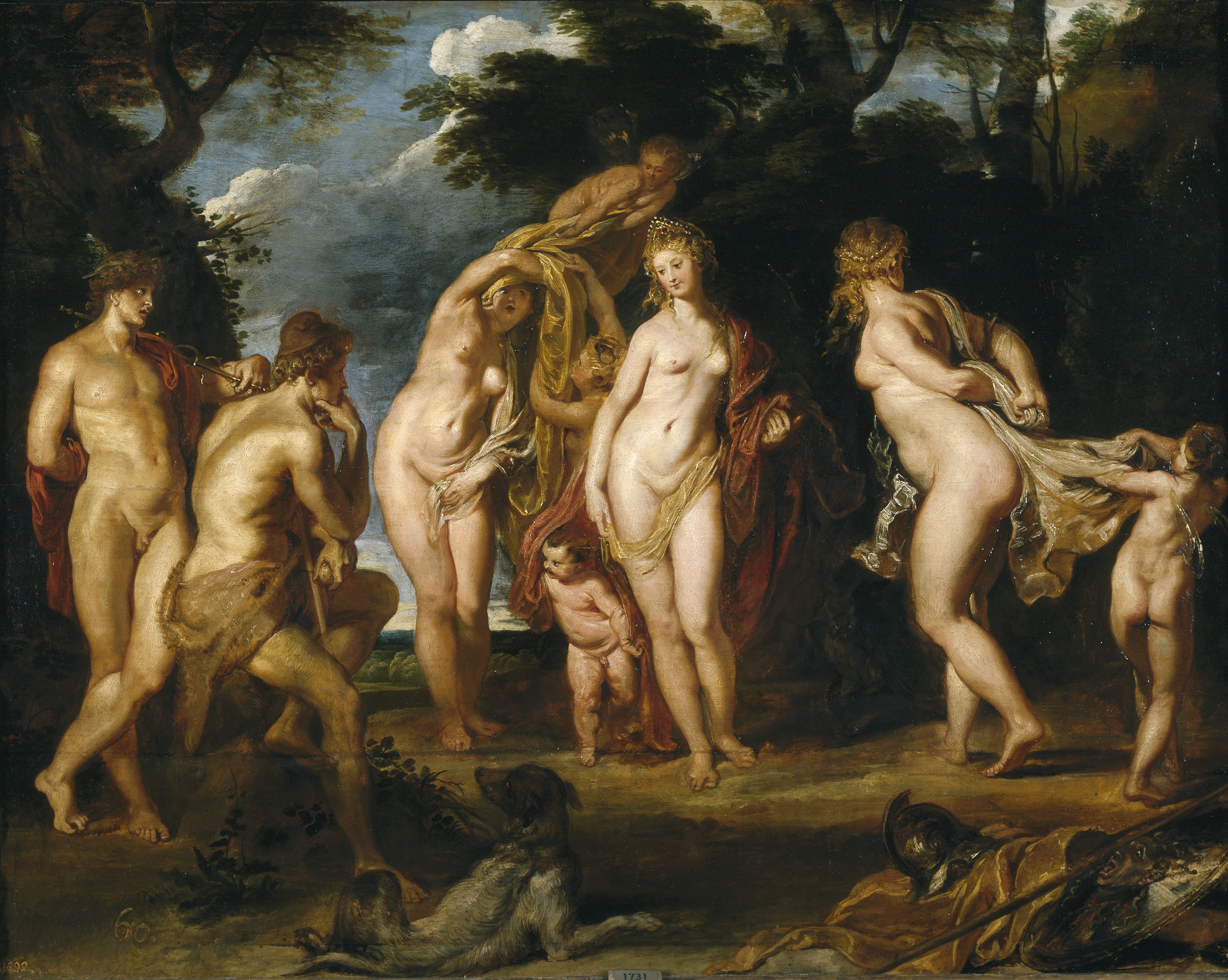
c. 1606, oil on panel, 89 x 114.5 cm, Prado; putti strip the goddesses

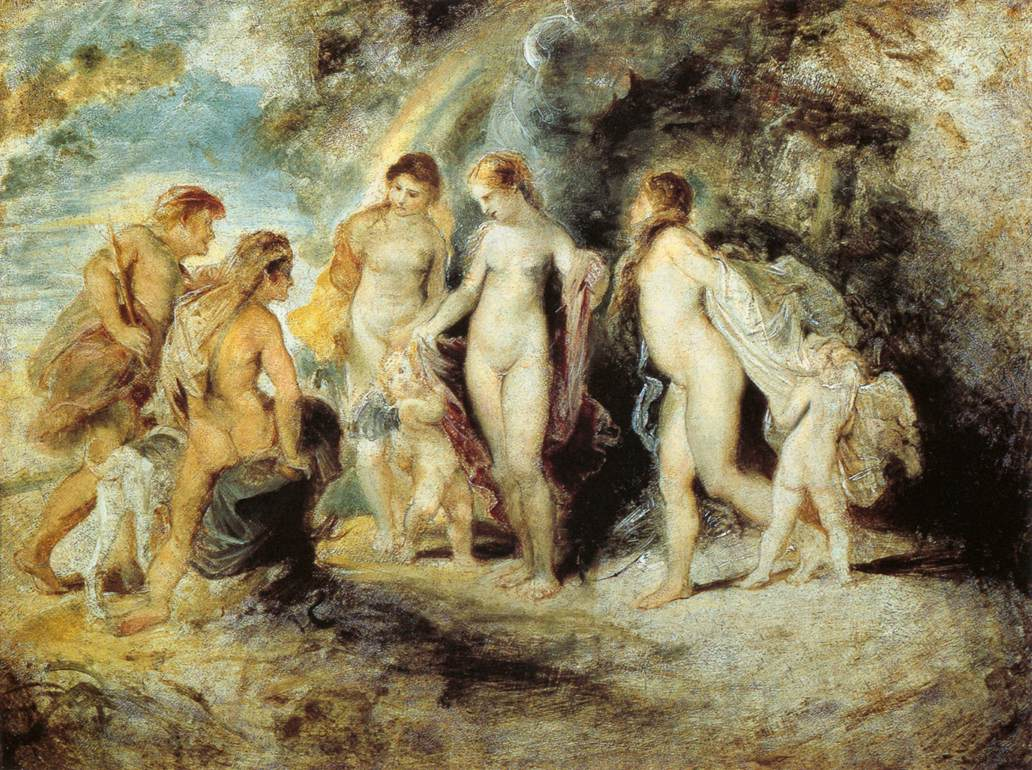
oil sketch on copper, 1606, 32.5 cm (12.7 in) x 43.5 cm (17.1 in), Academy of Fine Arts, Vienna

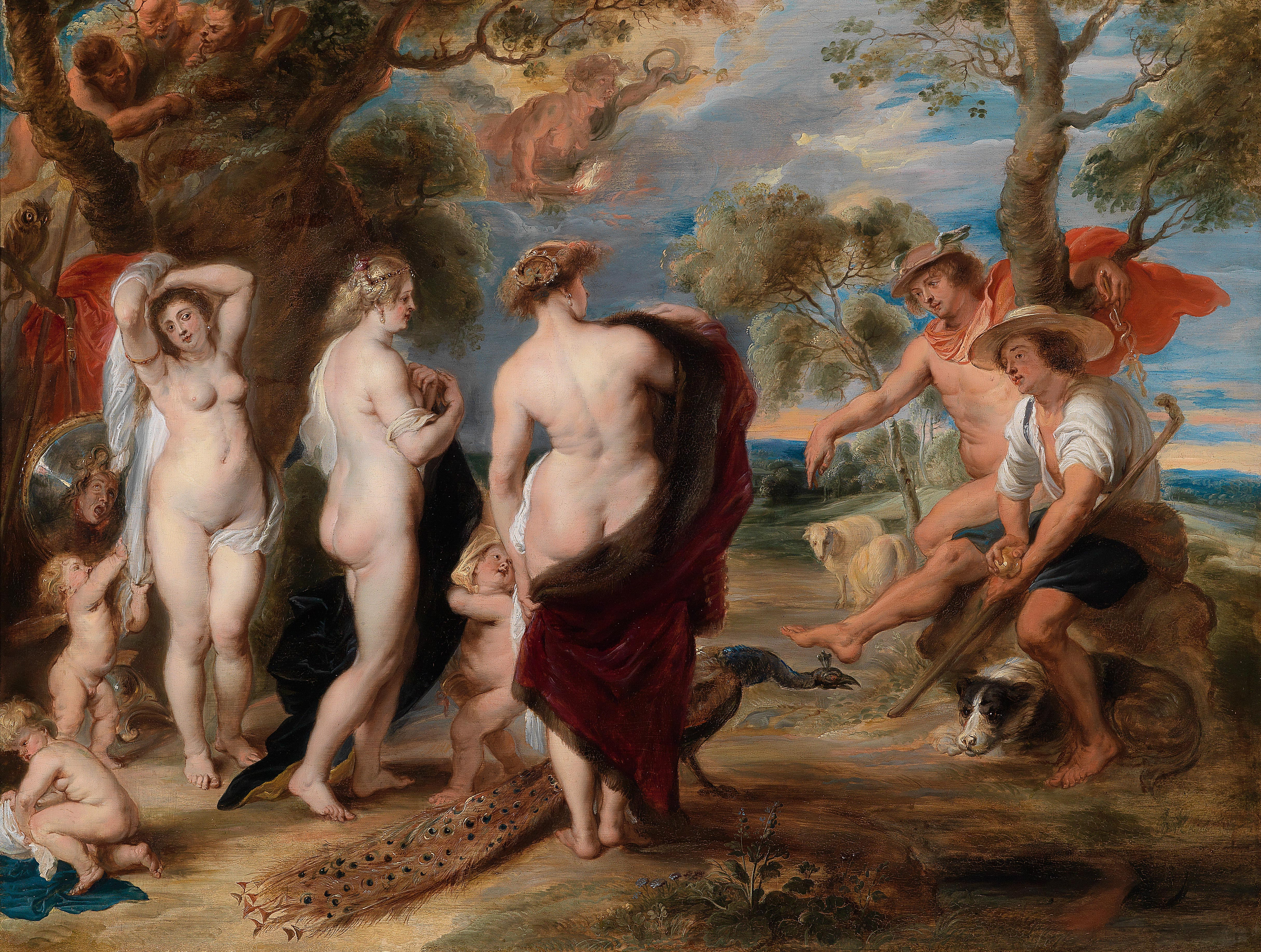
1636, 49 cm (19.2 in) x 63 cm (24.8 in), Gemäldegalerie Alte Meister, Dresden, probably earlier than the similar London painting
