= Family tree of the Greek gods =

Mythological family tree

The following is a family tree of gods, goddesses, and other divine and semi-divine figures from Ancient Greek mythology and Ancient Greek religion.

Chaos; The Void
Tartarus; The Abyss | Gaia; The Earth | Eros; Desire (Note: There are conflicting stories regarding the origins of Eros. Eros is usually mentioned as the son of Aphrodite and Ares, but Hesiod's Theogony places him as one of the primordial beings which came after Chaos.) | Erebus; Darkness | Nyx; The Night
Moros; Doom | the Oneiroi; Dreams | Nemesis; Retribution | Momus; Blame | Philotes; Affection | Geras; Aging
Typhon | Uranus; The Sky | the Ourea; Mountains | Pontus; The Sea | Aether; Heaven | Hemera; The Day
Thanatos; Death | Hypnos; Sleep | Eris; Strife | Apate; Deceit | Oizys; Distress
the Erinyes | the Gigantes | the Meliae | **Aphrodite** (Note: There are two major conflicting stories for Aphrodite's origins: Hesiod, in his Theogony, claims that she was "born" from the foam of the sea after Cronus castrated Uranus, thus making her Uranus' daughter; Homer, however, in his Iliad, has Aphrodite as daughter of Zeus and Dione. According to Plato, however, the two were entirely separate entities: Aphrodite Urania and Aphrodite Pandemos.) | the Hecatonchires | the Cyclopes | Echidna | the Hesperides (Note: Hesiod puts Nyx as the mother of the Hesperides; they are alternatively daughters of Nyx and Erebus, of Atlas, of Atlas and Hesperis, of Phorcys and Ceto, or of Zeus and Themis.) | the Keres | the Moirae | Charon
Oceanus | Tethys | Hyperion | Theia | Coeus | Phoebe | Cronus | Rhea | Themis | Mnemosyne | Crius | Iapetus
the Oceanids | Clymene | Helios; Sun | Eos; Dawn | Asteria | **Demeter** | **Hestia** (Note: Either Hestia or Dionysus is considered the 12th Olympian.) | **Hera** | Prometheus | Epimetheus
Inachus | Melia | the Heliades | Selene; Moon | Leto | Hades | **Poseidon** | **Zeus** | the Muses | Atlas
Io | Pleione
**Apollo** | **Artemis** | Persephone | **Athena** | Hebe | **Hephaestus** | **Ares**
Amphitrite | the Hyades | the Pleiades
Epaphus | Dione | Enyo | Eileithyia
Penelope | Maia
Alcmene | Semele | **Hermes** | **Aphrodite**
Heracles | **Dionysus** | Pan | Rhode | Peitho | Hermaphroditus | Eros | Harmonia | Deimos
Anteros | Himeros | Phobos

Key: The names of the generally accepted Olympians are given in bold font.

Key: The names of groups of gods or other mythological beings are given in italic font

Key: The names of the Titans have a green background.

Key: Dotted lines show a marriage or affair.

Key: Solid lines show children.

== See also ==
- Greek mythology
- List of Greek deities
- List of mortals in Greek mythology
- List of Greek mythological creatures
- Hesiod’s Theogony
