= Temple of Aphrodite, Sparta =

Sanctuary dedicated togoddess Aphrodite

The Temple of Aphrodite in Sparta was a sanctuary dedicated to the goddess Aphrodite.

The city of Sparta had at least two sanctuaries dedicated to Aphrodite. There was a Temple of Aphrodite Areia and an oracle of Aphrodite Ambologera, as well as a statue of Aphrodite Olympia in a sanctuary of Zeus, and a statue of Aphrodite Hera. The Temple of Aphrodite was built upon a hill. It was an unusual temple, as it was reportedly built in two stories, something which likely made it unique. Both storeys of the temple was dedicated to Aphrodite, but the upper floor was dedicated to her as Aphrodite Morpho. The first storey contained a wooden statue of the goddess in arms, and the Aphrodite Morpho was depicted seated, veiled and with fettered feet.

Pausanias described the temple in the second century:

A little farther on [in Sparta, Lakedaimonia] is a small hill, on which is an ancient temple with a wooden image of Aphrodite armed. This is the only temple I know that has an upper storey built upon it. It is a sanctuary of Morpho (the Shapely), a surname of Aphrodite, who sits wearing a veil and with fetters on her feet. The story is that the fetters were put on her by [the mythical king] Tyndareus, who symbolized by the bonds the faithfulness of wives to their husbands. The other account, that Tyndareus punished the goddess with fetters because he thought that from Aphrodite had come the shame of his daughters, I will not admit for a moment. For it were surely altogether silly to expect to punish the goddess by making a cedar figure and naming it Aphrodite.

The temple of Aphrodite in Sparta was regarded to be peculiar in the rest of Greece because the goddess was depicted in full armour. However, it is acknowledged that all the gods and goddesses depicted in Sparta wore armour, and though this may not have been technically true, it was regarded as a Spartan trait.

The remains of the temple have not yet been found.

== See also ==
- List of Ancient Greek temples
