= Ares =

God of war in ancient Greek religion

- God of war and courage
- Member of the Twelve Olympians
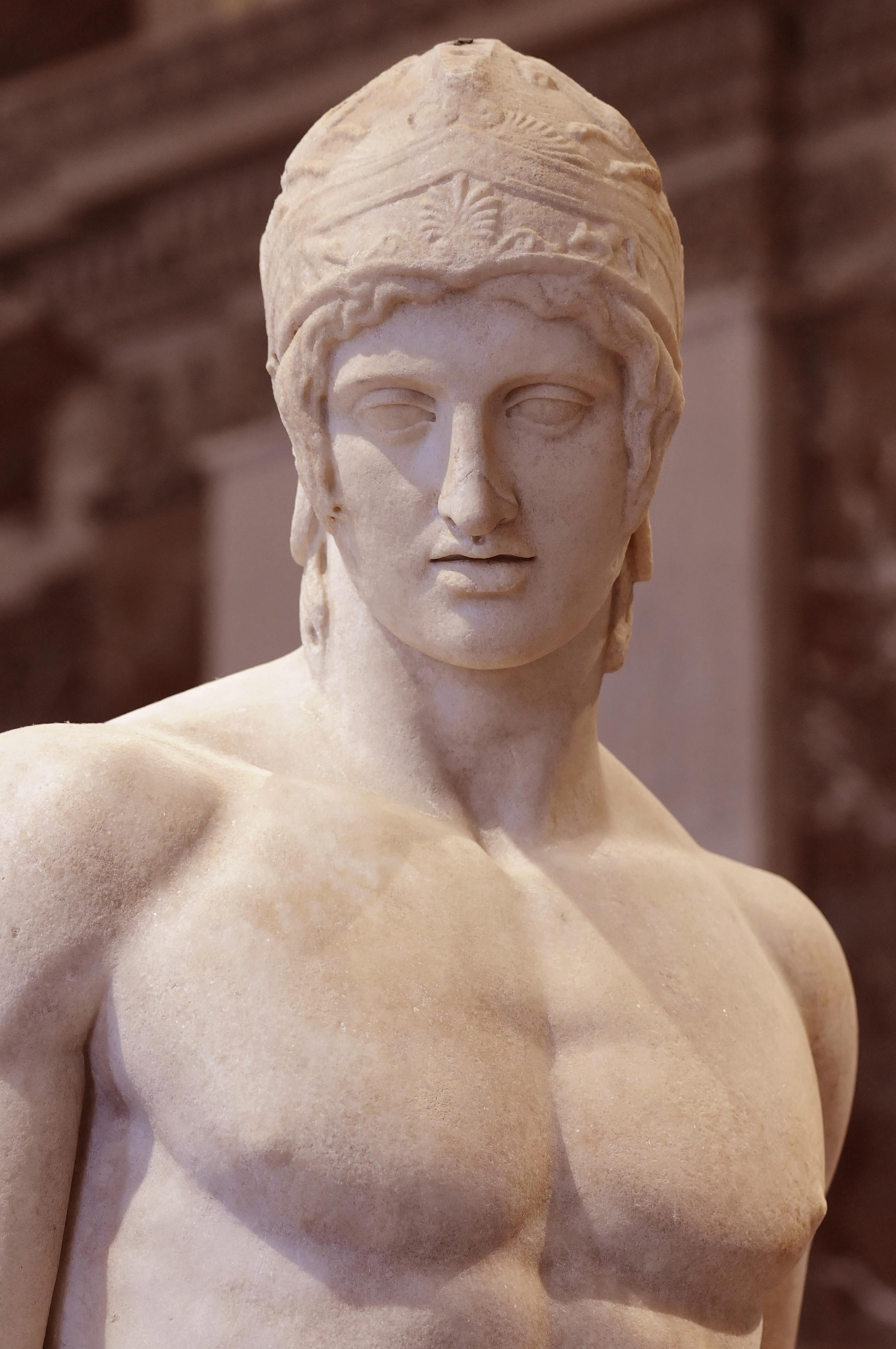
- Ares Borghese, a 1st or 2nd-century Roman statue copied from a 5th-century BC Greek original. Louvre.
- Abode: Mount Olympus, temples in mainland Greece, Crete and Asia minor
- Planet: Mars
- Symbols: Sword, spear, shield, helmet
- Day: Tuesday (hēméra Áreōs)

Genealogy
- Parents: Zeus and Hera
- Siblings: Hephaestus, Eileithyia, Hebe and several paternal half-siblings
- Spouse: Aphrodite
- Children: the Erotes (Eros and Anteros), Phobos, Deimos, Phlegyas, Harmonia, Enyalius, Thrax, Oenomaus, Cycnus, and the Amazons

Equivalents
- Roman: Mars

Ares (/ˈɛəriːz/; Ancient Greek: Ἄρης, Árēs [árɛːs]) is the Greek god of war and courage. He is one of the Twelve Olympians, and the son of Zeus and Hera. Many Greeks were ambivalent towards him. He embodies the physical valor necessary for success in war but can also personify sheer brutality and bloodlust, in contrast to his sister Athena, whose martial functions include military strategy and generalship. An association with Ares endows places, objects, and other deities with a savage, dangerous, or militarized quality.

Although Ares's name shows his origins as Mycenaean, his reputation for savagery was thought by some to reflect his likely origins as a Thracian deity. Some cities in Greece and several in Asia Minor held annual festivals to bind and detain him as their protector. In parts of Asia Minor, he was an oracular deity. Still further away from Greece, the Scythians were said to ritually kill one in a hundred prisoners of war as an offering to their equivalent of Ares. The later belief that ancient Spartans had offered human sacrifice to Ares may owe more to mythical prehistory, misunderstandings, and reputation than to reality.

Although there are many literary allusions to Ares's love affairs and children, he has a limited role in Greek mythology. When he does appear, he is often humiliated. In the Trojan War, Aphrodite, protector of Troy, persuades Ares to take the Trojans' side. The Trojans lose, while Ares's sister Athena helps the Greeks to victory. Most famously, when the craftsman-god Hephaestus discovers his wife Aphrodite is having an affair with Ares, he traps the lovers in a net and exposes them to the ridicule of the other gods.

Ares's nearest counterpart in Roman religion is Mars, who was given a more important and dignified place in ancient Roman religion as ancestral protector of the Roman people and state. During the Hellenization of Latin literature, the myths of Ares were reinterpreted by Roman writers under the name of Mars, and in later Western art and literature, the mythology of the two figures became virtually indistinguishable.

== Names ==
The etymology of the name Ares is traditionally connected with the Greek word ἀρή (arē), the Ionic form of the Doric ἀρά (ara), "bane, ruin, curse, imprecation". Walter Burkert notes that "Ares is apparently an ancient abstract noun meaning throng of battle, war." R. S. P. Beekes has suggested a Pre-Greek origin of the name. The earliest attested form of the name is the Mycenaean Greek 𐀀𐀩, a-re, written in the Linear B syllabic script.

The adjectival epithet, Areios ("warlike") was frequently appended to the names of other gods when they took on a warrior aspect or became involved in warfare: Zeus Areios, Athena Areia, even Aphrodite Areia ("Aphrodite within Ares" or "feminine Ares"), who was warlike, fully armoured and armed, partnered with Athena in Sparta, and represented at Kythira's temple to Aphrodite Urania. In the Iliad, the word ares is used as a common noun synonymous with "battle".

In the Classical period, Ares is given the epithet Enyalios, which seems to appear on the Mycenaean KN V 52 tablet as 𐀁𐀝𐀷𐀪𐀍, e-nu-wa-ri-jo. Enyalios was sometimes identified with Ares and sometimes differentiated from him as another war god with separate cult, even in the same town; Burkert describes them as "doubles almost".

== Epithets ==
- aatos or atos polemoio, insatiate at war.
- alloprosallos, leaning first to one side, then to the other.
- andreifontēs, man-slaying.
- apotimos, dishonoured by Sophocles.
- brotoloigos, plague of man.
- enyalios, warlike.
- Thēritas, at Sparta. Laconic form of Thersites, audacious.
- mainomenos, malignant.
- miaifonos, blood-stained
- tykton kakon, complete evil.

== Cult ==
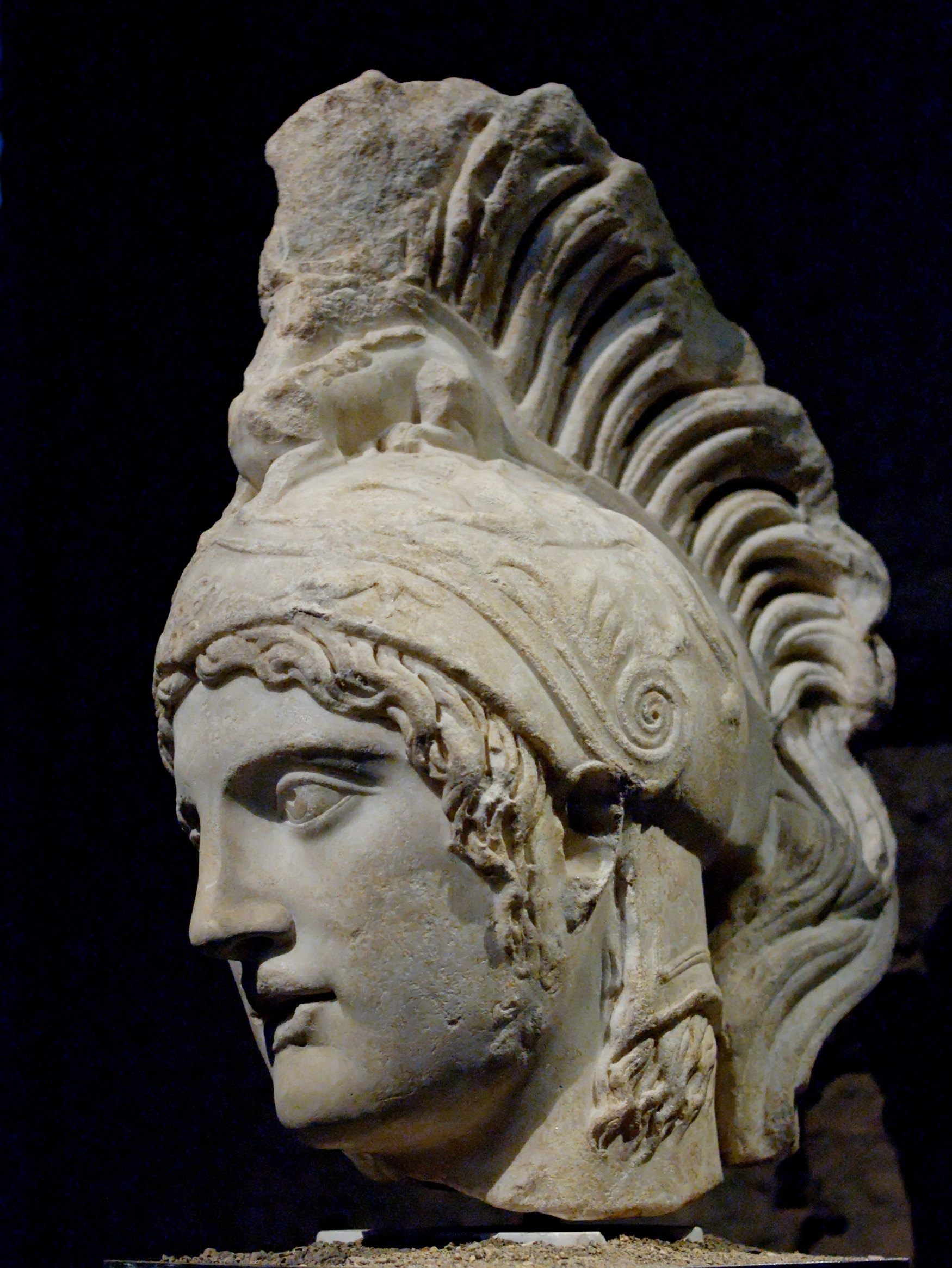
Ares, 2nd–3rd century AD, after a Greek bronze original by Alkamenes dated 420 BC, excavated in 1925 in Rome's Largo di Torre Argentina

In mainland Greece and the Peloponnese, only a few places are known to have had a formal temple and cult of Ares. (Note: Burkert lists temples at or near Troizen, Geronthrai and Halicarnassus. The Oxford Classical Dictionary adds Argos, Megalopolis, Therapne and Tegea in the Peloponnese, Athens and Erythrae, and Cretan sites Cnossus, Lato, Biannos and perhaps Olus.) Pausanias (2nd century AD) notes an altar to Ares at Olympia, and the moving of a Temple of Ares to the Athenian agora during the reign of Augustus, essentially rededicating it (2 AD) as a Roman temple to the Augustan Mars Ultor. The Areopagus ("mount of Ares"), a natural rock outcrop in Athens, some distance from the Acropolis, was supposedly where Ares was tried and acquitted by the gods for his revenge-killing of Poseidon's son, Halirrhothius, who had raped Ares's daughter Alcippe. Its name was used for the court that met there, mostly to investigate and try potential cases of treason.

Numismatist M. Jessop Price states that Ares "typified the traditional Spartan character", but had no important cult in Sparta; and he never occurs on Spartan coins. Pausanias gives two examples of his cult, both of them conjointly with or "within" a warlike Aphrodite, on the Spartan acropolis. Gonzalez observes, in his 2005 survey of Ares's cults in Asia Minor, that cults to Ares on the Greek mainland may have been more common than some sources assert. Wars between Greek states were endemic; war and warriors provided Ares's tribute, and fed his insatiable appetite for battle.

Ares's attributes are instruments of war: a helmet, shield, and sword or spear. Libanius "makes the apple sacred to Ares", but "offers no further comment", nor connections to any aetiological myth. Apples are one of Aphrodite's sacred or symbolic fruits. Littlewood follows Artemidorus claim that to dream of sour apples presages conflict, and lists Ares alongside Eris and the mythological "Apples of Discord".

=== Chained statues ===
Gods were immortal but could be bound and restrained, both in mythic narrative and in cult practice. There was an archaic Spartan statue of Ares in chains in the temple of Enyalios (sometimes regarded as the son of Ares, sometimes as Ares himself), which Pausanias claimed meant that the spirit of war and victory was to be kept in the city. (Note: "Opposite this temple [the temple of Hipposthenes] is an old image of Enyalius in fetters. The idea the Lacedaemonians express by this image is the same as the Athenians express by their Wingless Victory; the former think that Enyalius will never run away from them, being bound in the fetters, while the Athenians think that Victory, having no wings, will always remain where she is".) The Spartans are known to have ritually bound the images of other deities, including Aphrodite and Artemis (cf Ares and Aphrodite bound by Hephaestus), and in other places there were chained statues of Artemis and Dionysos.

Statues of Ares in chains are described in the instructions given by an oracle of the late Hellenistic era to various cities of Pamphylia (in Anatolia) including Syedra, Lycia and Cilicia, places almost perpetually under threat from pirates. Each was told to set up a statue of "bloody, man-slaying Ares" and provide it with an annual festival in which it was ritually bound with iron fetters ("by Dike and Hermes") as if a supplicant for justice, put on trial and offered sacrifice. The oracle promises that "thus will he become a peaceful deity for you, once he has driven the enemy horde far from your country, and he will give rise to prosperity much prayed for". This Ares karpodotes ("giver of Fruits") is well attested in Lycia and Pisidia.

=== Sacrifices ===
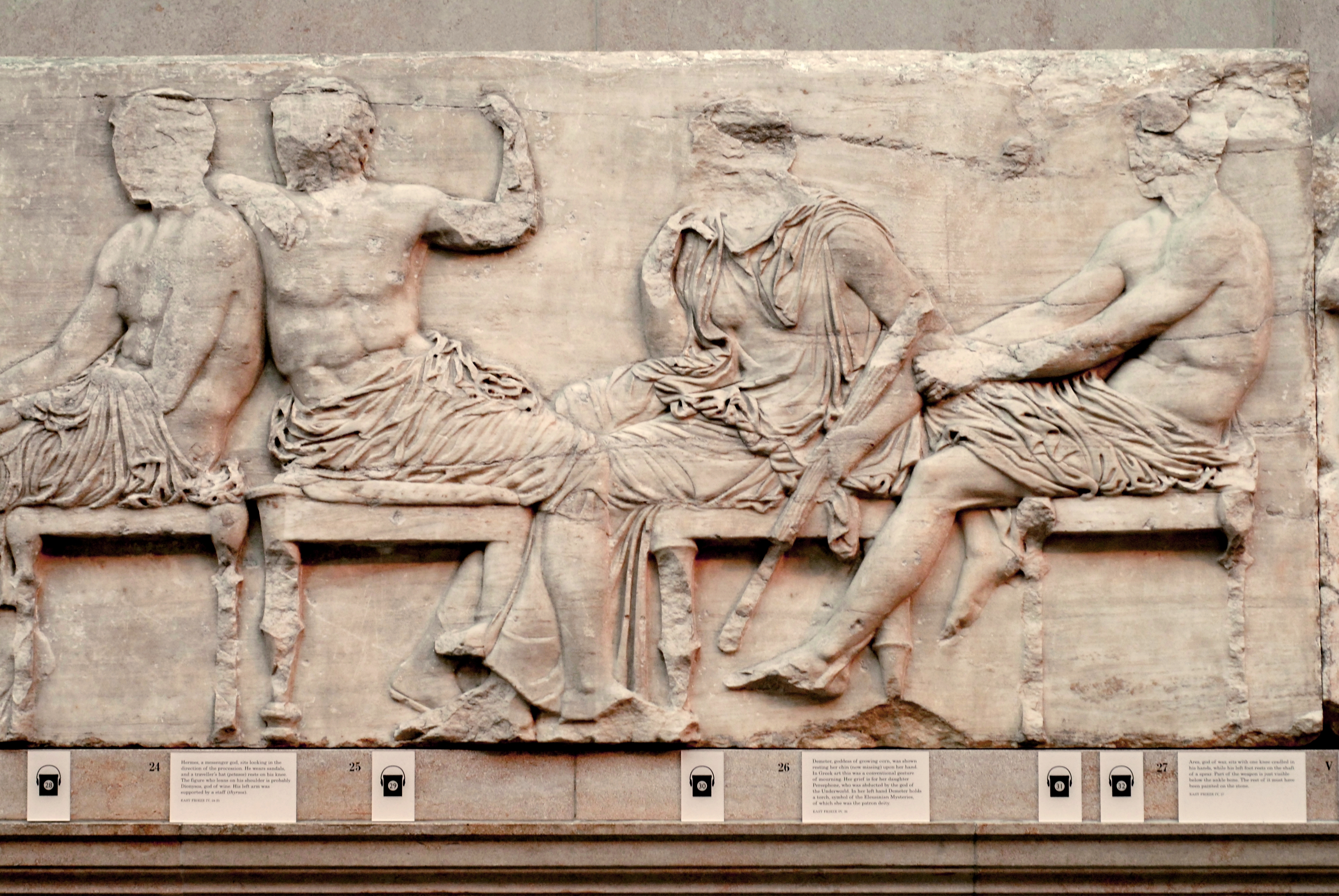
Ares (right) with Demeter, Dionysus and Hermes on the frieze of the Parthenon, c. 447–433 BC, British Museum

Like most Greek deities, Ares was given animal sacrifice; in Sparta, after battle, he was given an ox for a victory by stratagem, or a rooster for victory through onslaught. (Note: Hughes is citing Plutarch, Instituta Laconica (trans. Babbit) Loeb, 1931, 25, 238F; "Whenever they overcome their enemies by out-generaling them, they sacrifice a bull to Ares, but when the victory is gained in open conflict, they offer a cock, thus trying to make their leaders habitually not merely fighters but tacticians as well". In The Life of Agesilaus, 33.4: Plutarch claims that the Spartans thought victory was such ordinary work for them, they only sacrificed a rooster in recognition.) The usual recipient of sacrifice before battle was Athena. Reports of historic human sacrifice to Ares in an obscure rite known as the Hekatomphonia represent a very long-standing error, repeated through several centuries and well into the modern era. (Note: Among others, it has been repeated by ancient sources including Apollonius of Athens, Pausanias, Porphyry, Plutarch, Clement of Alexandria and by many modern historians; see Hughes, "Human Sacrifice", 1991, pp.119-122 & notes 145, 146.) The hekatomphonia was an animal sacrifice to Zeus; it could be offered by any warrior who had personally slain one hundred of the enemy. (Note: In the Protrepticus, Clement of Alexandria writes: "Indeed, Aristomenes the Messenian sacrificed 300 men to Zeus of Ithome...[including] Theopompus the Lacedaemonian (Spartan) king, a noble victim." The rite was supposedly performed three times by Aristomenes: Plutarch did not find it credible that one man could have slaughtered three hundred. The Spartans claimed that Theopompus had only been wounded) Pausanias reports that in Sparta, each company of youths sacrificed a puppy to Enyalios before engaging in a hand-to-hand "fight without rules" at the Phoebaeum. (Note: "Here each company of youths sacrifices a puppy to Enyalius, holding that the most valiant of tame animals is an acceptable victim to the most valiant of the gods. I know of no other Greeks who are accustomed to sacrifice puppies except the people of Colophon; these too sacrifice a puppy, a black bitch, to the Wayside Goddess (Hecate)".) The chthonic night-time sacrifice of a dog to Enyalios became assimilated to the cult of Ares. Porphyry claims, without detail, that Apollodorus of Athens (circa second century BC) says the Spartans made human sacrifices to Ares, but this may be a reference to mythic pre-history.

=== Thrace and Scythia ===
A Thracian god identified by Herodotus (c. 484 – c. 425 BC) as Ares, through interpretatio Graeca, was one of three otherwise unnamed deities that Thracian commoners were said to worship. Herodotus recognises and names the other two as "Dionysus" and "Artemis", and claims that the Thracian aristocracy exclusively worshiped "Hermes". In Herodotus's Histories, the Scythians worship an indigenous form of Greek Ares, who is otherwise unnamed, but ranked beneath Tabiti (whom Herodotus claims as a form of Hestia), Api and Papaios in Scythia's divine hierarchy. His cult object was an iron sword. The "Scythian Ares" was offered blood-sacrifices (or ritual killings) of cattle, horses and "one in every hundred human war-captives", whose blood was used to douse the sword. Statues, and complex platform-altars made of heaped brushwood were devoted to him. This sword-cult, or one very similar, is said to have persisted among the Alans. Some have posited that the "Sword of Mars" in later European history alludes to the Huns having adopted Ares.

=== Asia Minor ===
In some parts of Asia Minor, Ares was a prominent oracular deity, something not found in any Hellenic cult to Ares or Roman cult to Mars. Ares was linked in some regions or polities with a local god or cultic hero, and recognised as a higher, more prestigious deity than in mainland Greece. His cults in southern Asia Minor are attested from the 5th century BC and well into the later Roman Imperial era, at 29 different sites, and on over 70 local coin issues. He is sometimes represented on coinage of the region by the "Helmet of Ares" or carrying a spear and a shield, or as a fully armed warrior, sometimes accompanied by a female deity. In what is now western Turkey, the Hellenistic city of Metropolis built a monumental temple to Ares as the city's protector, not before the 3rd century BC. It is now lost, but the names of some of its priests and priestesses survive, along with the temple's likely depictions on coins of the province.

=== Crete ===
A sanctuary of Aphrodite was established at Sta Lenika, on Crete, between the cities of Lato and Olus, possibly during the Geometric period. It was rebuilt in the late 2nd century BC as a double-sanctuary to Ares and Aphrodite. Inscriptions record disputes over the ownership of the sanctuary. The names of Ares and Aphrodite appear as witness to sworn oaths, and there is a Victory thanks-offering to Aphrodite, whom Millington believes had capacity as a "warrior-protector acting in the realm of Ares". There were cultic links between the Sta Lenika sanctuary, Knossos and other Cretan states, and perhaps with Argos on the mainland. While the Greek literary and artistic record from both the Archaic and Classical eras connects Ares and Aphrodite as complementary companions and ideal though adulterous lovers, their cult pairing and Aphrodite as warrior-protector is localised to Crete.

=== Aksum ===
In Africa, Maḥrem, the principal god of the kings of Aksum prior to the 4th century AD, was invoked as Ares in Greek inscriptions. The anonymous king who commissioned the Monumentum Adulitanum in the late 2nd or early 3rd century refers to "my greatest god, Ares, who also begat me, through whom I brought under my sway [various peoples]". The monumental throne celebrating the king's conquests was itself dedicated to Ares. In the early 4th century, the last pagan king of Aksum, Ezana, referred to "the one who brought me forth, the invincible Ares".

== Characterisation ==
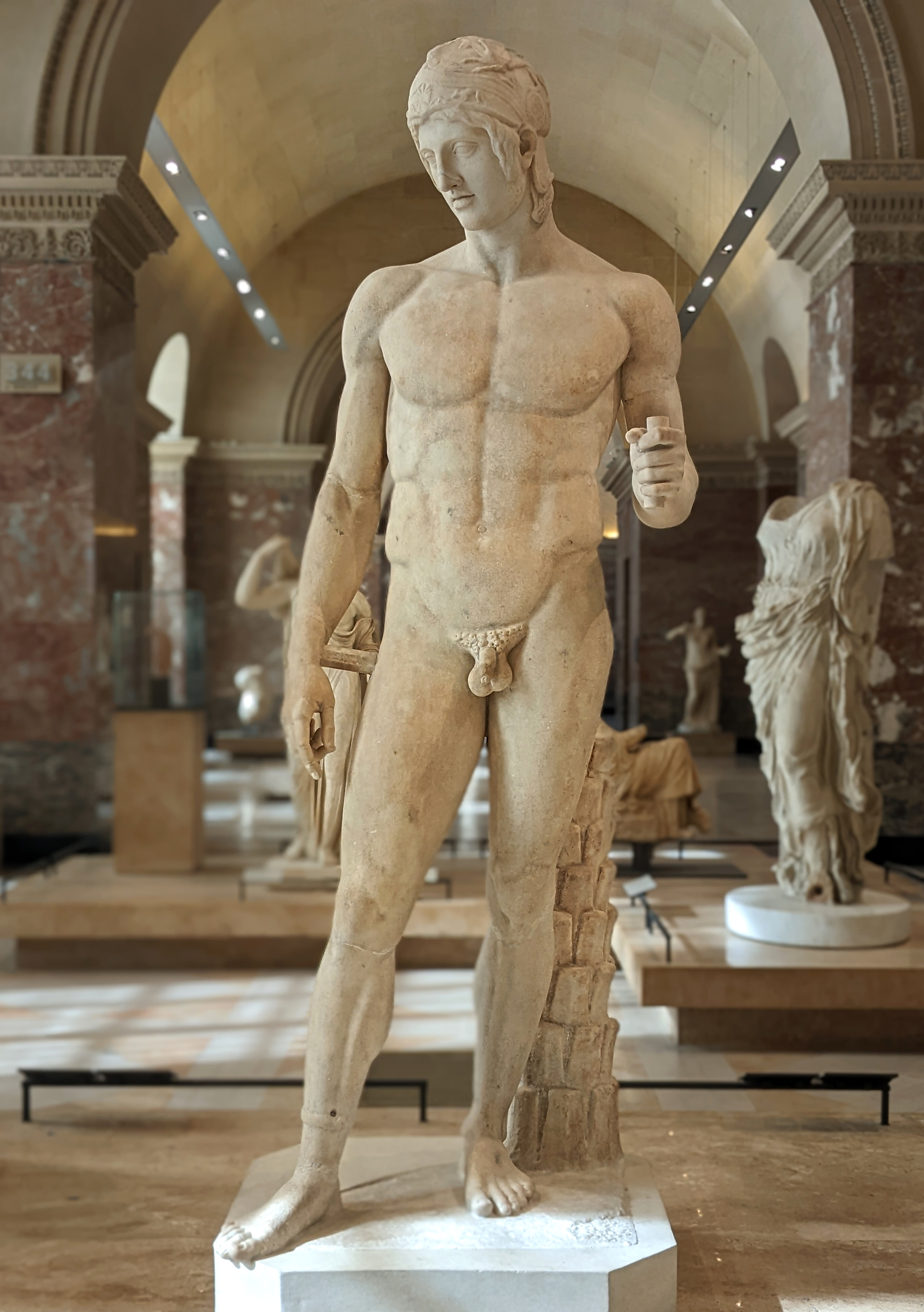
The Ares Borghese

Ares was one of the Twelve Olympians in the archaic tradition represented by the Iliad and Odyssey. In Greek literature, Ares often represents the physical or violent and untamed aspect of war and is the personification of sheer brutality and bloodlust ("overwhelming, insatiable in battle, destructive, and man-slaughtering", as Burkert puts it), in contrast to his sister, the armored Athena, whose functions as a goddess of intelligence include military strategy and generalship. An association with Ares endows places and objects with a savage, dangerous, or militarized quality; but when Ares does appear in myths, he typically faces humiliation.

In the Iliad, Zeus expresses a recurring Greek revulsion toward the god when Ares returns wounded and complaining from the battlefield at Troy:

Then looking at him darkly Zeus who gathers the clouds spoke to him:
"Do not sit beside me and whine, you double-faced liar.
To me you are the most hateful of all gods who hold Olympus.
Forever quarrelling is dear to your heart, wars and battles.
...
And yet I will not long endure to see you in pain, since
you are my child, and it was to me that your mother bore you.
But were you born of some other god and proved so ruinous
long since you would have been dropped beneath the gods of the bright sky."

This ambivalence is expressed also in the Greeks' association of Ares with the Thracians, whom they regarded as a barbarous and warlike people. Thrace was considered to be Ares's birthplace and his refuge after the affair with Aphrodite was exposed to the general mockery of the other gods. (Note: Homer Odyssey viii. 361; for Ares/Mars and Thrace, see Ovid, Ars Amatoria, book ii.part xi.585, which tells the same tale: "Their captive bodies are, with difficulty, freed, at your plea, Neptune: Venus runs to Paphos: Mars heads for Thrace."; for Ares/Mars and Thrace, see also Statius, Thebaid vii. 42)

A late 6th-century BC funerary inscription from Attica emphasizes the consequences of coming under Ares's sway:

Stay and mourn at the tomb of dead Kroisos
Whom raging Ares destroyed one day, fighting in the foremost ranks.

== Mythology ==
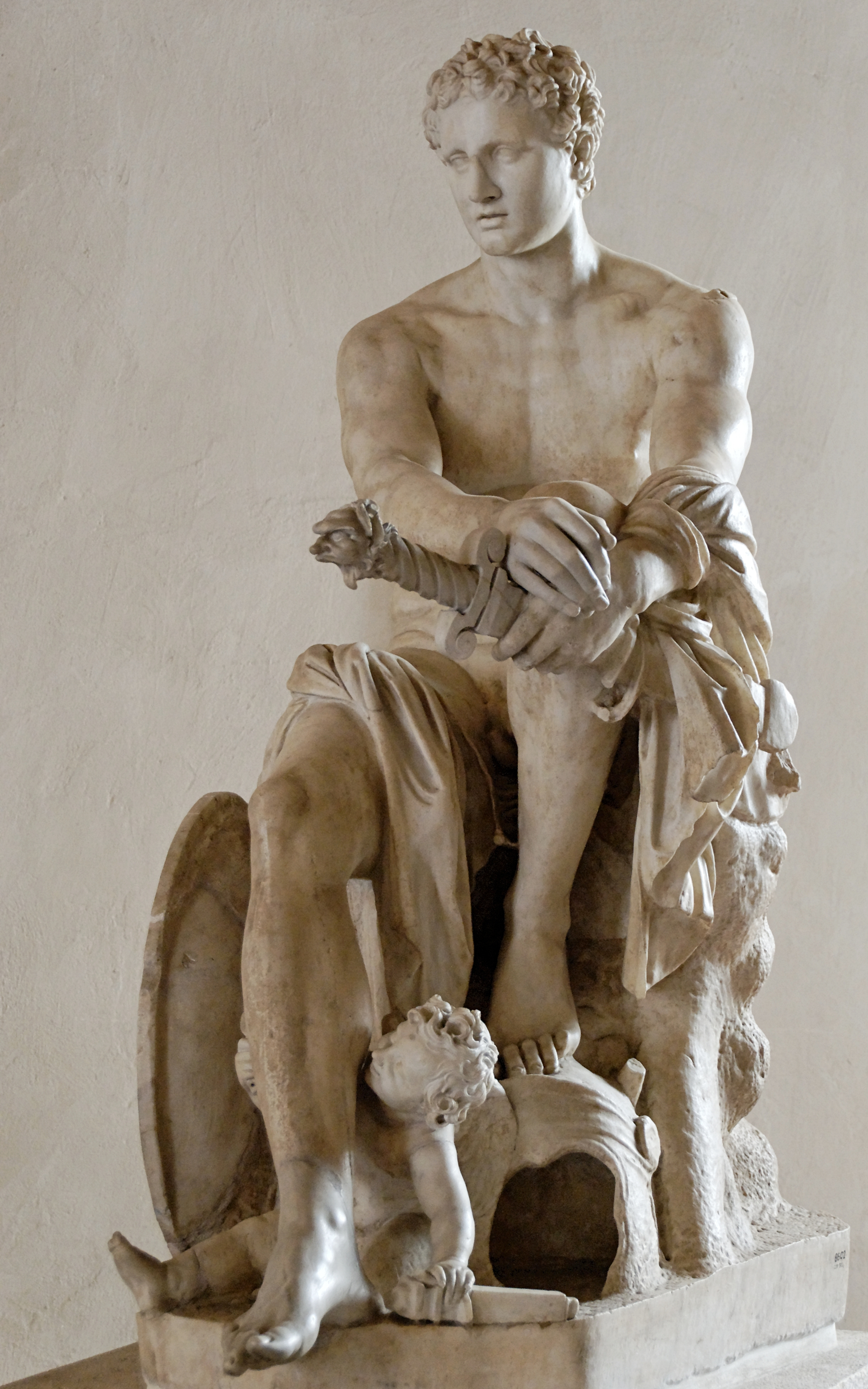
The Ludovisi Ares, Roman version of a Greek original c. 320 BC, with 17th-century restorations by Bernini

=== Birth ===
He is one of the Twelve Olympians, and the son of Zeus and Hera. By contrast, Ares's Roman counterpart Mars was born from Juno alone, according to Ovid. A lesser known version found in Greek scholia to Aeschylus' Suppliants which is diametrically opposing the version by Ovid states that Ares was born to Zeus only, who drank from the "life-giving" waters of the Nile, a river described as prone to producing male children.

=== Argonautica ===
In the Argonautica, the Golden Fleece hangs in a grove sacred to Ares, until its theft by Jason. The Birds of Ares (Ornithes Areioi) drop feather darts in defense of the Amazons' shrine to Ares, as father of their queen, on a coastal island in the Black Sea.

=== Founding of Thebes ===
Ares plays a central role in the founding myth of Thebes, as the progenitor of the Ismenian dragon slain by Cadmus. The dragon's teeth were sown into the ground as if a crop and sprang up as the fully armored autochthonic Spartoi. Cadmus placed himself in the god's service for eight years to atone for killing the dragon. To further propitiate Ares, Cadmus married Harmonia, a daughter of Ares's union with Aphrodite. In this way, Cadmus harmonized all strife and founded the city of Thebes. In reality, Thebes came to dominate Boeotia's great and fertile plain, which in both history and myth was a battleground for competing polities. According to Plutarch, the plain was anciently described as "The dancing-floor of Ares".

=== Aphrodite ===
In Homer's Odyssey, in the tale sung by the bard in the hall of Alcinous, the Sun-god Helios once spied Ares and Aphrodite having sex secretly in the hall of Hephaestus, her husband. Helios reported the incident to Hephaestus. Contriving to catch the illicit couple in the act, Hephaestus fashioned a finely-knitted and nearly invisible net with which to snare them. At the appropriate time, this net was sprung, and trapped Ares and Aphrodite locked in very private embrace.

But Hephaestus was not satisfied with his revenge, so he invited the Olympian gods and goddesses to view the unfortunate pair. For the sake of modesty, the goddesses demurred, but the male gods went to witness the sight. Some commented on the beauty of Aphrodite, others remarked that they would eagerly trade places with Ares, but all who were present mocked the two. Once the couple was released, the embarrassed Ares returned to his homeland, Thrace, and Aphrodite went to Paphos. Afterwards, Hephaestus divorced Aphrodite, and she and Ares married.

In a much later interpolated detail, Ares put the young soldier Alectryon, who was Ares' companion in drinking and even love-making, by his door to warn them of Helios's arrival as Helios would tell Hephaestus of Aphrodite's infidelity if the two were discovered, but Alectryon fell asleep on guard duty. Helios discovered the two and alerted Hephaestus. The furious Ares turned the sleepy Alectryon into a rooster which now always announces the arrival of the sun in the morning, as a way of apologizing to Ares.

The Chorus of Aeschylus's Suppliants (written 463 BC) refers to Ares as Aphrodite's "mortal-destroying bedfellow". In the Illiad, Ares helps the Trojans because of his affection for their divine protector, Aphrodite; she thus redirects his innate destructive savagery to her own purposes.

=== Giants ===
In one archaic myth, related only in the Iliad by the goddess Dione to her daughter Aphrodite, two chthonic giants, the Aloadae, named Otus and Ephialtes, bound Ares in chains and imprisoned him in a bronze urn, where he remained for thirteen months, a lunar year. "And that would have been the end of Ares and his appetite for war, if the beautiful Eriboea, the young giants' stepmother, had not told Hermes what they had done," she related. In this, [Burkert] suspects "a festival of licence which is unleashed in the thirteenth month". Ares was held screaming and howling in the urn until Hermes rescued him, and Artemis tricked the Aloadae into slaying each other.

In Nonnus's Dionysiaca, in the war between Cronus and Zeus, Ares killed an unnamed giant son of Echidna who was allied with Cronus, and described as spitting "horrible poison" and having "snaky" feet.

In some versions of the Gigantomachy, Ares was the god who killed the giant Mimas.

In the 2nd century AD Metamorphoses of Antoninus Liberalis, when the monstrous Typhon attacked Olympus the gods transformed into animals and fled to Egypt; Ares changed into a fish, the Lepidotus (sacred to the Egyptian war-god Anhur). Liberalis's koine Greek text is a "completely inartistic" epitome of Nicander's now lost Heteroeumena (2nd century BC).

=== Iliad ===
In Homer's Iliad, Ares has no fixed allegiance. He promises Athena and Hera that he will fight for the Achaeans but Aphrodite persuades him to side with the Trojans. During the war, Diomedes fights Hector and sees Ares fighting on the Trojans' side. Diomedes calls for his soldiers to withdraw. Zeus grants Athena permission to drive Ares from the battlefield. Encouraged by Hera and Athena, Diomedes thrusts with his spear at Ares. Athena drives the spear home, and all sides tremble at Ares's cries. Ares flees to Mount Olympus, forcing the Trojans to fall back. Ares overhears that his son Ascalaphus has been killed and wants to change sides again, rejoining the Achaeans for vengeance, disregarding Zeus's order that no Olympian should join the battle. Athena stops him. Later, when Zeus allows the gods to fight in the war again, Ares attacks Athena to avenge his previous injury. Athena overpowers him by striking him with a boulder.

=== Attendants ===
Deimos ("Terror" or "Dread") and Phobos ("Fear") are Ares's companions in war, and according to Hesiod, are also his children by Aphrodite. Eris, the goddess of discord, or Enyo, the goddess of war, bloodshed, and violence, was considered the sister and companion of the violent Ares. In at least one tradition, Enyalius, rather than another name for Ares, was his son by Enyo.

Ares may also be accompanied by Kydoimos, the daemon of the din of battle; the Makhai ("Battles"); the "Hysminai" ("Acts of manslaughter"); Polemos, a minor spirit of war, or only an epithet of Ares, since it has no specific dominion; and Polemos's daughter, Alala, the goddess or personification of the Greek war-cry, whose name Ares uses as his own war-cry. Ares's sister Hebe ("Youth") also draws baths for him.

According to Pausanias, local inhabitants of Therapne, Sparta, recognized Thero, "feral, savage", as a nurse of Ares.

=== Offspring and affairs ===
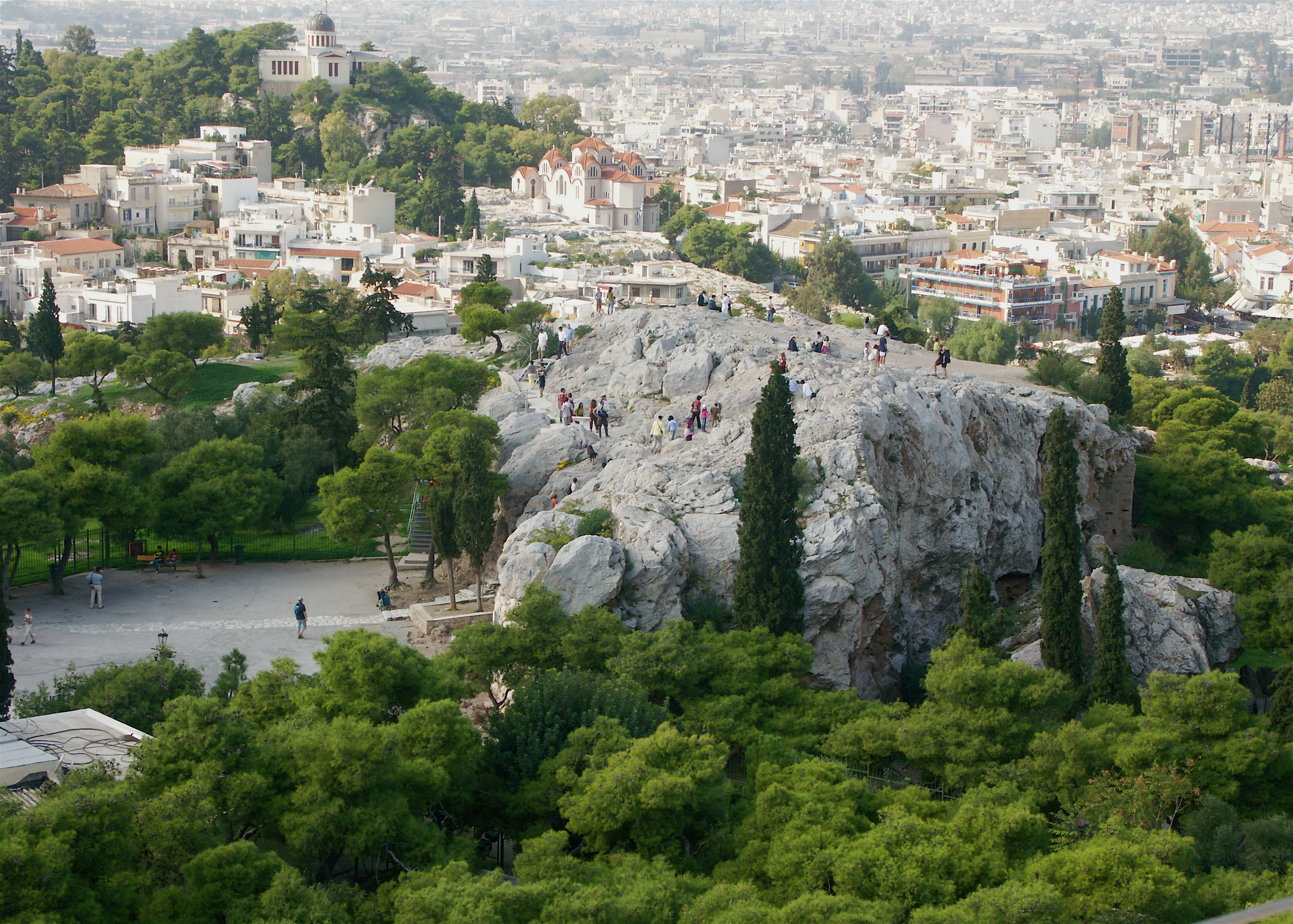
The Areopagus as viewed from the Acropolis

Though Ares plays a relatively limited role in Greek mythology as represented in literary narratives, his numerous love affairs and abundant offspring are often alluded to. The union of Ares and Aphrodite created the gods Eros, Anteros, Phobos, Deimos, and Harmonia. Other versions include Alcippe as one of their daughters.

Ares had a romantic liaison with Eos, the goddess of the dawn. Aphrodite discovered them, and in anger she cursed Eos with insatiable lust for men.

Cycnus (Κύκνος) of Macedonia was a mortal son of Ares who tried to build a temple to his father with the skulls and bones of guests and travellers. Heracles fought him and, in one account, killed him. In another account, Ares fought his son's killer but Zeus parted the combatants with a thunderbolt.

By a woman named Teirene he had a daughter named Thrassa, who in turn had a daughter named Polyphonte. Polyphonte was cursed by Aphrodite to love and mate with a bear, producing two sons, Agrius and Oreius, who were hubristic toward the gods and had a habit of eating their guests. Zeus sent Hermes to punish them, and he chose to chop off their hands and feet. Since Polyphonte was descended from him, Ares stopped Hermes, and the two brothers came into an agreement to turn Polyphonte's family into birds instead. Oreius became an eagle owl, Agrius a vulture, and Polyphonte a strix, possibly a small owl, certainly a portent of war; Polyphonte's servant prayed not to become a bird of evil omen and Ares and Hermes fulfilled her wish by choosing the woodpecker for her, a good omen for hunters.

==== List of offspring and their mothers ====
Sometimes poets and dramatists recounted ancient traditions, which varied, and sometimes they invented new details; later scholiasts might draw on either or simply guess. Thus while Phobos and Deimos were regularly described as offspring of Ares, others listed here such as Meleager, Sinope and Solymus were sometimes said to be children of Ares and sometimes given other fathers.

The following is a list of Ares's offspring, by various mothers. Beside each offspring, the earliest source to record the parentage is given, along with the century to which the source dates.

Offspring	Mother	Source	Date
Phobos	Aphrodite	Hes. Theog.	8th cent. BC
Deimos	Aphrodite	Hes. Theog.	8th cent. BC
Harmonia	Aphrodite	Hes. Theog.	8th cent. BC
Eros	Aphrodite	Simonides	
Anteros	Aphrodite	Cic. DND	1st cent. BC
Odomantus	Calliope		
Mygdon	Calliope		
Edonus	Calliope		
Biston	Terpsichore	Etym. Mag.	12th cent. AD
Biston	Callirrhoe	Steph. Byz.	6th cent. AD
Enyalius	Enyo		
Dragon of Thebes	Erinys of Telphusa		
Nike	No mother mentioned	HH 8	
Sinope (possibly)	Aegina	Schol. Ap. Rhod.	
Edonus	Callirrhoe	Steph. Byz.	6th cent. AD
Odomantus	Callirrhoe	Steph. Byz.	6th cent. AD
Cycnus	Cleobula		
Cycnus	Pelopia	Apollod.	1st/2nd cent. AD
Cycnus	Pyrene	Apollod.	1st/2nd cent. AD
Diomedes of Thrace	Cyrene	Apollod.	1st/2nd cent. AD
Crestone	Cyrene	Tzetzes	12th cent. AD
The Amazons	Harmonia		
Oenomaus	Sterope	Hyg. Fab.	1st cent. AD
Oenomaus	Harpina	Diod. Sic.	1st cent. BC
Oenomaus	Eurythoe the Danaid	Tzetzes	12th cent. AD
Evenus	Sterope	Ps.-Plutarch	
Evenus	Demonice	Apollod.	1st/2nd cent. AD
Thrassa	Tereine	Ant. Lib.	2nd/3rd cent. AD
Melanippus	Triteia	Paus.	2nd cent. AD
Aeropus	Aerope	Paus.	2nd cent. AD
Alcippe	Aglauros	Apollod.	1st/2nd cent. AD
Meleager	Althaea	Apollod.	1st/2nd cent. AD
Calydon	Astynome		
Ascalaphus	Astyoche	Paus.	2nd cent. AD
Ialmenus	Astyoche	Paus.	2nd cent. AD
Parthenopaeus	Atalanta	Apollod.	1st/2nd cent. AD
Solymus	Caldene	Etym. Mag.	12th cent. AD
Phlegyas	Chryse	Paus.	2nd cent. AD
Phlegyas	Dotis	Apollod.	1st/2nd cent. AD
Pangaeus	Critobule	Ps.-Plutarch	
Molus, Pylus	Demonice	Apollod.	1st/2nd cent. AD
Thestius	Pisidice	Ps.-Plutarch	
Thestius	Demonice	Apollod.	1st/2nd cent. AD
Stymphelus	Dormothea	Ps.-Plutarch	
Antiope	Otrera	Hyg. Fab.	1st cent. AD
Hippolyta	Otrera	Hyg. Fab.	1st cent. AD
Melanippe	Otrera		
Penthesilea	Otrera	Apollod.	1st/2nd cent. AD
Sinope	Parnassa	Eumelus	
Lycaon	Pyrene		
Lycastus	Phylonome	Ps.-Plutarch	
Parrhasius	Phylonome	Ps.-Plutarch	
Oxylus	Protogeneia	Apollod.	1st/2nd cent. AD
Bithys	Sete		
Tmolus	Theogone	Ps.-Plutarch	
Ismarus	Thracia		
Alcon of Thrace	No mother mentioned	Hyg. Fab.	1st cent. AD
Chalyps	No mother mentioned		
Cheimarrhoos	No mother mentioned	Schol. Hes., WD	
Dryas	No mother mentioned	Apollod.	1st/2nd cent. AD
Hyperbius	No mother mentioned		
Lycus of Libya	No mother mentioned		
Nisos	No mother mentioned	Hyg. Fab.	1st cent. AD
Oeagrus	No mother mentioned	Nonnus	5th cent. AD
Paeon	No mother mentioned	Etym. Mag.	12th cent. AD
Portheus (Porthaon)	No mother mentioned	Ant. Lib.	2nd/3rd cent. AD
Tereus	No mother mentioned	Apollod.	1st/2nd cent. AD

== Mars ==
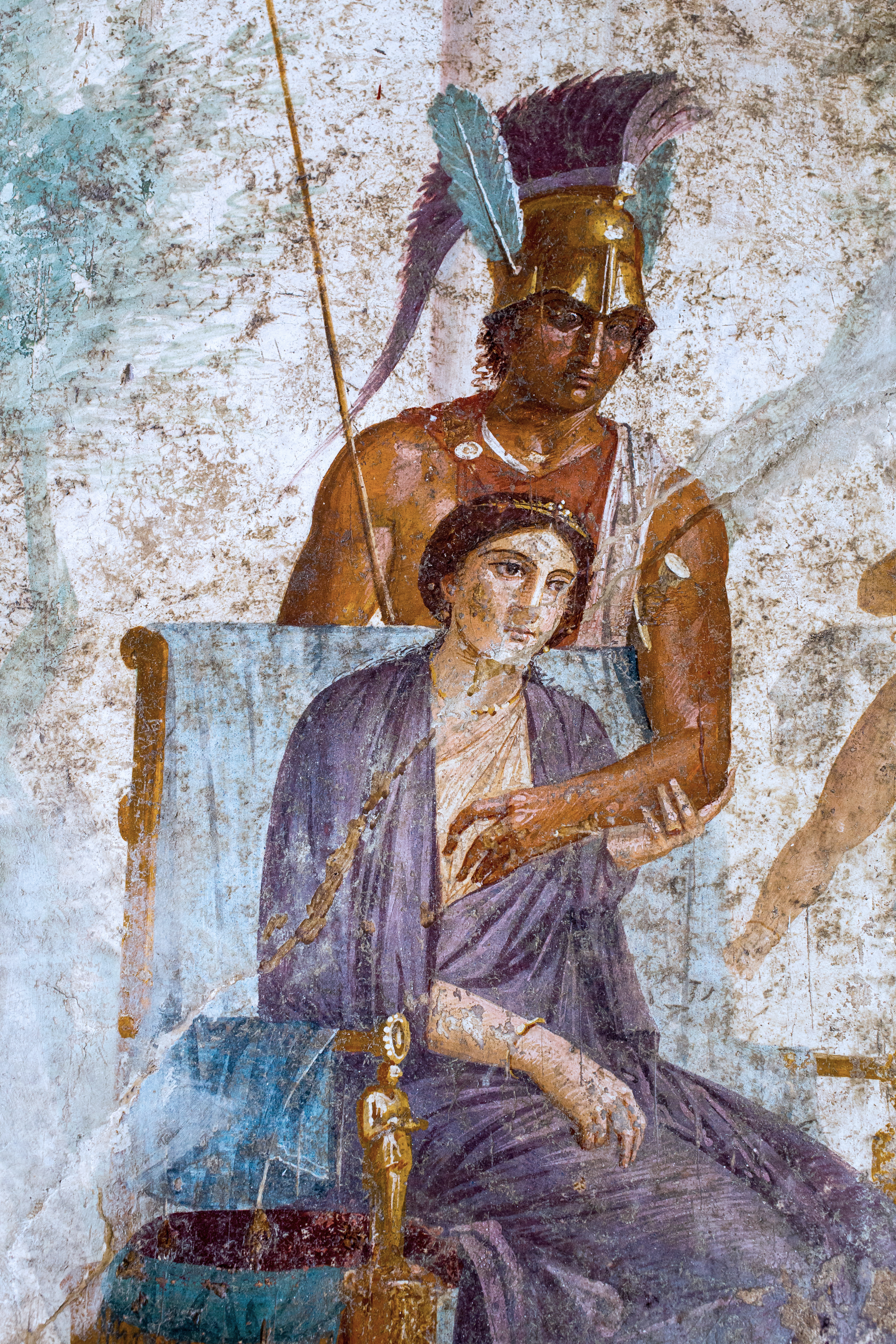
Wall-painting in Pompeii, c. 20 BC – 50s AD, showing Mars and Venus. The Roman god of war is depicted as youthful and beardless, reflecting the influence of the Greek Ares.

The nearest counterpart of Ares among the Roman gods is Mars, a son of Jupiter and Juno, pre-eminent among the Roman army's military gods but originally an agricultural deity. As a father of Romulus, Rome's legendary founder, Mars was given an important and dignified place in ancient Roman religion, as a guardian deity of the entire Roman state and its people. Under the influence of Greek culture, Mars was identified with Ares, but the character and dignity of the two deities differed fundamentally. Mars was represented as a means to secure peace, and he was a father (pater) of the Roman people. In one tradition, he fathered Romulus and Remus through his rape of Rhea Silvia. In another, his lover, the goddess Venus, gave birth to Aeneas, the Trojan prince and refugee who "founded" Rome several generations before Romulus.

In the Hellenization of Latin literature, the myths of Ares were reinterpreted by Roman writers under the name of Mars. Greek writers under Roman rule also recorded cult practices and beliefs pertaining to Mars under the name of Ares. Thus in the classical tradition of later Western art and literature, the mythology of the two figures later became virtually indistinguishable.

== Renaissance and later depictions ==
In Renaissance and Neoclassical works of art, Ares's symbols are a spear and helmet, his animal is a dog, and his bird is the vulture. In literary works of these eras, Ares is replaced by the Roman Mars, a romantic emblem of manly valor rather than the cruel and blood-thirsty god of Greek mythology.

== Genealogy ==
Ares's family tree

Gaia
Uranus
Uranus's genitals	Coeus	Phoebe	Cronus	Rhea
Leto	Zeus	Hera	Poseidon	Hades	Demeter	Hestia
Apollo	Artemis	a
b
ARES	Hephaestus
Metis
Athena
Maia
Hermes
Semele
Dionysus
Dione
a	b
Aphrodite

== See also ==
- Family tree of the Greek gods
