= Cycnus (son of Ares) =

Character in Greek mythology, son of Ares, killed by Heracles

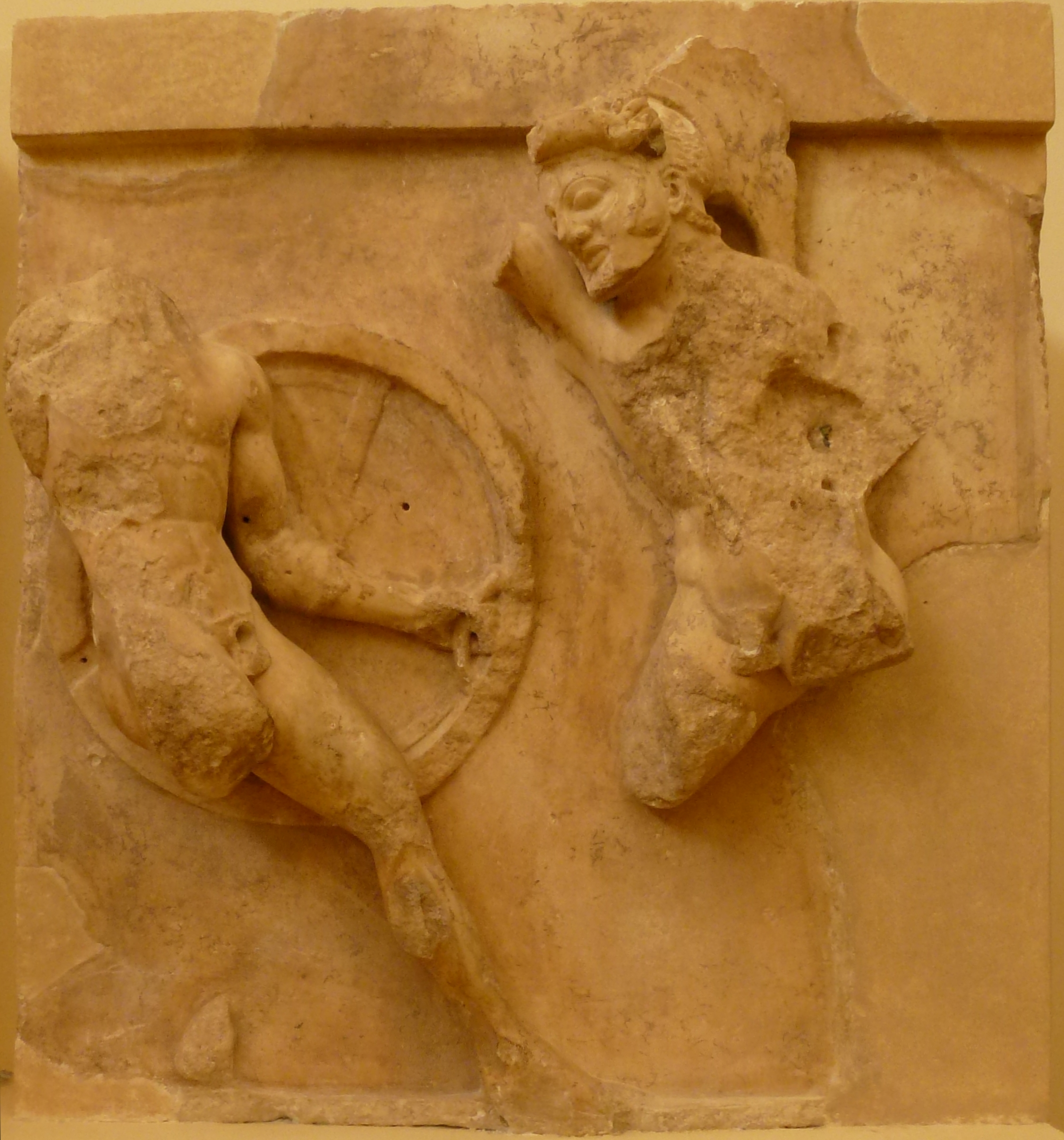
Heracles fights Cycnus from a metope of the Treasury of the Athenians at Delphi, Greece.

In Greek mythology, Cycnus (Ancient Greek: Κύκνος, romanized: Kyknos, lit. 'swan') or Cygnus was a bloodthirsty and cruel man who dwelt either in Pagasae, Thessaly or by the river Echedorus in Macedonia.

== Family ==
Cycnus was the son of Ares by Pelopia or Pyrene. He married Themistonoe, daughter of King Ceyx of Trachis.

== Mythology ==
Cycnus killed all of his guests until he was slain by Heracles. According to Pausanias, one of the men murdered by him was Lycus of Thrace.

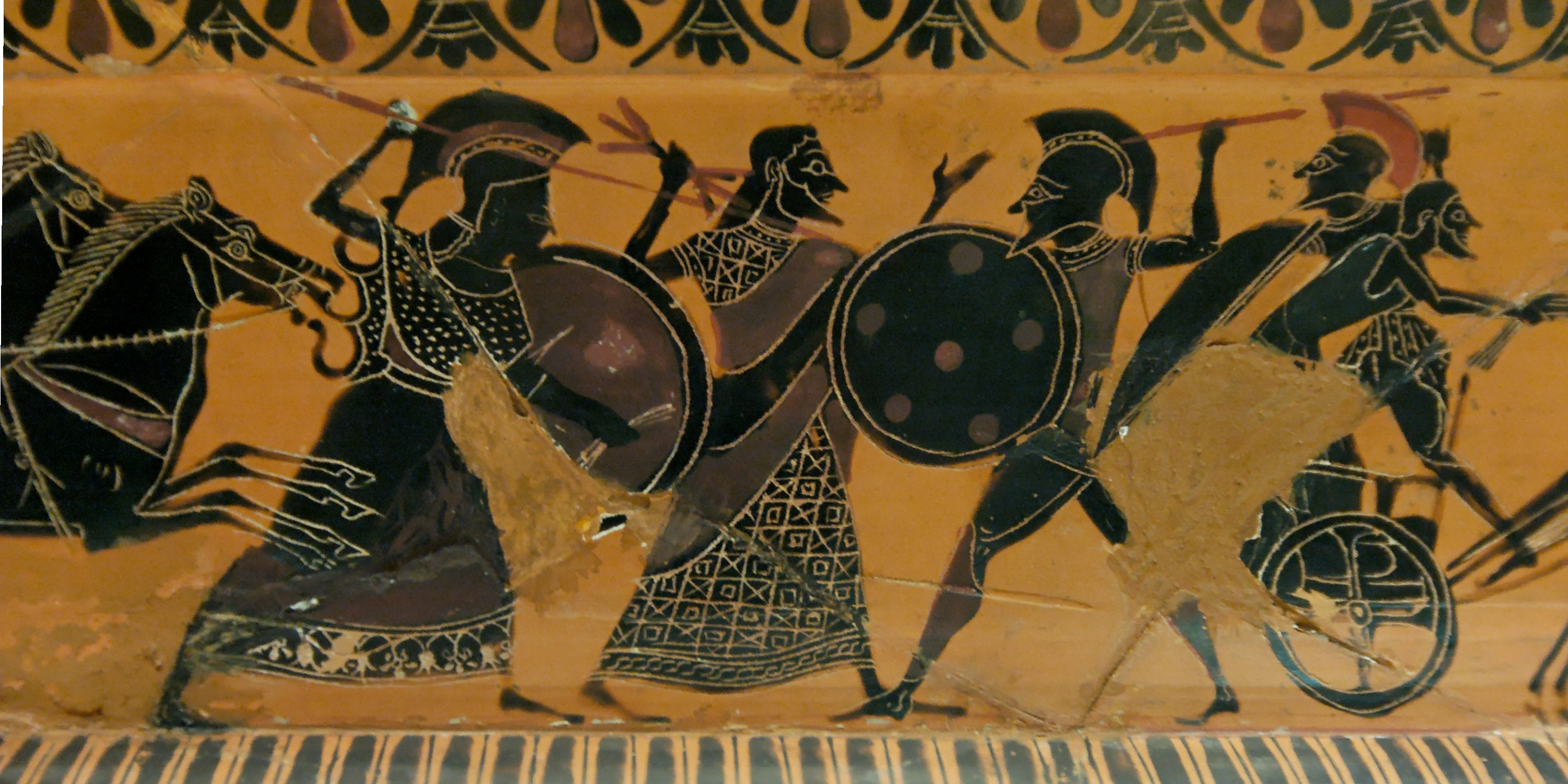
Zeus parts Athena and Ares, while Kyknos flees in a chariot (right) as Heracles arrives (left), on an Attic black-figured volute-krater, c. 540–510 BCE signed by Nikosthenes (British Museum).

Pseudo-Apollodorus wrote of Cycnus the Thessalian, the son of Pelopia, and Cycnus the Macedonian, the son of Pyrene, as two distinct encounters of Heracles, mentioning them separately. The Thessalian Cycnus, he relates, challenged Heracles to single combat and was killed by him; the same is recounted by Diodorus. The Macedonian Cycnus, according to the Bibliotheca, also challenged Heracles to single combat; Ares attempted to avenge his son's death, but Zeus hurls a thunderbolt between the combatants, causing them to part.

In the Shield of Heracles, Heracles and his nephew, Iolaus, are traveling through Thessaly on their way to Trachis when they encounter Cycnus and Ares, each pair riding a chariot; it is mentioned that Heracles was en route to the court of King Ceyx.

Apollo, whose Pagasaean sanctuary was beside the site where the characters met, is said to have stirred Heracles up against Cycnus.

Heracles accepts Cycnus's challenge and as he puts on his armor to prepare for battle, Athena appears before him, and tells Heracles that, should he kill Cycnus, he must not take his armor as spoils, but instead focus on Ares, who will surely seek to avenge Cycnus's death.

Heracles and Cycnus then clash in single combat; Cycnus hurls his spear at Heracles's shield, but fails to penetrate it, after which Heracles drives his spear through Cycnus's neck, killing him. Ares is enraged by his son's death and moves to kill Heracles when Athena appears before him, urging him to check his anger and cease fighting. Ares refuses to listen, however, and again charges at Heracles, hurling his spear at his shield; Athena, however, turns his spear aside.

Ares then draws his sword and leaps at Heracles, who, seeing an opening, thrusts his spear into Ares's thigh, causing the god to fall to the ground; Ares's twin sons, Phobos and Deimos, appear to rescue him and take him back to Mount Olympus.

Heracles then strips Cycnus of his armor, after which he and Iolaus continue on their journey to Trachis; Cycnus was buried by his father-in-law Сeyx and people of the neighboring cities, but Apollo, still angry over Cycnus's actions, has the river Anaurus flood the area and wash Cycnus's tomb away.

According to Euripides, Heracles shot Cycnus with his arrows, and this took place in Amphanae near the river Anaurus.

Eustathius of Thessalonica relates that Ares changed Cycnus into a swan rather than let him die by the hand of Heracles.

== General and cited references ==
- Diodorus Siculus, The Library of History translated by Charles Henry Oldfather. Twelve volumes. Loeb Classical Library. Cambridge, Massachusetts: Harvard University Press; London: William Heinemann, Ltd. 1989. Vol. 3. Books 4.59–8. Online version at Bill Thayer's Web Site
- Diodorus Siculus, Bibliotheca Historica. Vol 1-2. Immanel Bekker. Ludwig Dindorf. Friedrich Vogel. in aedibus B. G. Teubneri. Leipzig. 1888–1890. Greek text available at the Perseus Digital Library.
- Euripides, The Complete Greek Drama edited by Whitney J. Oates and Eugene O'Neill Jr. in two volumes. 1. Heracles, translated by E. P. Coleridge. New York. Random House. 1938. Online version at the Perseus Digital Library.
- Euripides, Euripidis Fabulae. vol. 2. Gilbert Murray. Oxford. Clarendon Press, Oxford. 1913. Greek text available at the Perseus Digital Library.
- Gaius Julius Hyginus, Fabulae from The Myths of Hyginus translated and edited by Mary Grant. University of Kansas Publications in Humanistic Studies. Online version at the Topos Text Project.
- Hesiod, Shield of Heracles from The Homeric Hymns and Homerica with an English Translation by Hugh G. Evelyn-White, Cambridge, MA., Harvard University Press; London, William Heinemann Ltd. 1914. Online version at the Perseus Digital Library. Greek text available from the same website.
- Pausanias, Description of Greece with an English Translation by W. H. S. Jones, Litt.D., and H. A. Ormerod, M.A., in 4 Volumes. Cambridge, MA, Harvard University Press; London, William Heinemann Ltd. 1918. Online version at the Perseus Digital Library
- Pausanias, Graeciae Descriptio. 3 vols. Leipzig, Teubner. 1903. Greek text available at the Perseus Digital Library.
- Pseudo-Apollodorus, The Library with an English Translation by Sir James George Frazer, F.B.A., F.R.S. in 2 Volumes, Cambridge, MA, Harvard University Press; London, William Heinemann Ltd. 1921. Online version at the Perseus Digital Library. Greek text available from the same website.
