= Pylus (mythology) =

In Greek mythology, Pylus (Ancient Greek: Πύλος means "in the gateway") was a member of the Aetolian royal family. Pylus was a son of Ares and princess Demonice, daughter of King Agenor of Pleuron. He was the brother of Evenus, Molus and Thestius. Pylus was said to give his name to the Aetolian city of Pylene located between the rivers Achelous and Evenos.
