= Pyrene (mythology) =

In Greek mythology, Pyrene (Ancient Greek: Πυρήνη, romanized: Purḗnē) may refer to:

- Pyrene, daughter of King Bebrycius and a lover (or victim, depending on the myth) of Heracles. She bore a serpent and became so terrified that she fled to the woods where she died. Heracles cried out her name in grief upon finding her remains, which name echoed across the mountain range of the Pyrenees, causing them to be named after her.
- Pyrene, also called Pelopia, mother of Cycnus with Ares.
