= Molus (son of Ares) =

In Greek mythology, Molus (/ˈmoʊləs/; Ancient Greek: Μῶλος or Μόλος, romanized: Mōlos or Mólos, lit. 'toil and moil', 'struggle', or 'fight') was a member of the Aetolian royal family.

== Family ==
Molus was the son of Ares and princess Demonice, daughter of King Agenor of Pleuron. He had three brothers namely: Evenus, Pylus and Thestius. Molus was the father of Moline who mothered the Molionides by Actor of Elis.

== Mythology ==
Molus only appeared in Apollodorus, where the scholar discussed the descendants of Aeolus, son of Hellen:

And Agenor, son of Pleuron, married Epicaste, daughter of Calydon, and begat Porthaon and Demonice, who had Evenus, Molus, Pylus, and Thestius by Ares.
