= Apotrophia =

Epithet of Aphrodite in Boeotia

Apotrophia or Apostrophia (Ancient Greek: Ἀποτροφία, romanized: Apotrophía (or Ἀποστροφία in modern texts); "the expeller" or "repeller") was an epithet of the Greek goddess Aphrodite, under which she was worshipped at Thebes, and which described her as the goddess who expelled from the hearts of men the desire after sinful pleasure and lust. Her worship under this name was believed to have been instituted by Harmonia, together with that of Aphrodite Urania and Pandemos, and the antiquity of her statues confirmed this belief.
