= Demonice of Aetolia =

Figure of Greek mythology

In Greek mythology, Demonice (/ˌdɛməˈnaɪsiː/; Ancient Greek: Δημονίκη, romanized: Dēmonī́kē) was a Aetolian princess as the daughter of King Agenor of Pleuron and Epicaste and thus sister of Porthaon and in some account, Thestius. She bore Ares four sons: Evenus, Molus, Pylus, and Thestius. Her son's names may be intended to be eponyms, with Evenus corresponding to the river Evinos in Aetolia; Pylus to the Aetolian city of Pylene between the rivers Achelous and Evenos; and Molus to the people named Molossians from Epirus. Demonice was also known as Demodice (Δημοδίκη) or Demodoce.

== Mythology ==
Demonice was recounted by Hesiod in his Catalogue of Women in the following lines:

Demodoce whom very many of men on earth, mighty princes, wooed, promising splendid gifts, because of her exceeding beauty.
