= Thrassa =

Character in Greek mythology

In Greek mythology, Thrassa (Ancient Greek: Θρᾷσσα, romanized: Thrâissa or Thrāissa, lit. 'Thracian woman'), was the daughter of Ares and Tereine, daughter of the river-god Strymon. Hipponous, son of Triballos (eponym or god of the Triballoi (Τριβαλλοί) tribe of Thrace), married her and they had a daughter called Polyphonte. This daughter scorned the activities of Aphrodite and went to the mountains as a companion and sharer of sports with Artemis. Thus, the goddess of love made her fall in love with a bear and drove her mad. Polyphonte eventually coupled with a bear and bore the ursine giants Agrius and Oreion.
