= Gelos (mythology) =

Personification of laughter in Greek mythology

In Greek mythology, Gelos (/ˈɡɛloʊs, -ɒs/; Ancient Greek: Γέλως) was the divine personification of laughter. According to Philostratus the Elder, he was believed to enter the retinue of Dionysus alongside Comus. Plutarch relates that Lycurgus of Sparta dedicated a small statue of Gelos to the god, and elsewhere mentions that in Sparta there was a sanctuary of Gelos, as well as those of Thanatos, Phobos "and other [personifications of] experiences of this kind".

Risus was the Latin rendition of the name Gelos. A festival in honor of Risus (i.e. Gelos) in Thessaly was described by Apuleius, but it is unknown whether it was an actual event or a writer's invention.
