= Temple of Aphrodite, Kythira =

Temple in Greece

Coordinates: 36°13′36″N 23°04′53″E

The Temple of Aphrodite Kytherea was a sanctuary in ancient Kythira dedicated to the goddess Aphrodite. It was famous for reportedly being the eldest temple of Aphrodite in Greece. It was dedicated to the goddess under her name and aspect as Aphrodite Ourania and contained a statue of an Armed Aphrodite. The temple is dated to the 6th century BCE. While considered a significant sanctuary, it was described as a small building.

According to Hesiod, Kythira was the first island that Aphrodite passed as she rose from the sea.

Herodotus described it:

This temple, I discover from making inquiry, is the oldest of all the temples of the goddess, for the temple in Cyprus was founded from it, as the Cyprians themselves say; and the temple on Cythera was founded by Phoenicians from this same land of Syria.

Pausanias also said of it:

In Kythera [off the coast of Lakedaimonia] is . . . the sanctuary of Aphrodite Ourania (the Heavenly) is most holy, and it is the most ancient of all the sanctuaries of Aphrodite among the Greeks. The goddess herself is represented by an armed image of wood.

...a sanctuary of the Heavenly Aphrodite; the first men to establish her cult were the Assyrians, after the Assyrians the Paphians of Cyprus and the Phoenicians who live at Ascalon in Palestine; the Phoenicians taught her worship to the people of Cythera.

== See also ==
- List of Ancient Greek temples
