= Enyo =

Greek goddess of war

In Greek mythology, Enyo (/ɪˈnaɪoʊ/; Ancient Greek: Ἐνυώ, romanized: Enuṓ) is a war-goddess, frequently associated with the war-god Ares. The Romans identified her with Bellona.

Enyo is also the name of one of the Graeae, one of three grey-haired sisters who share an eye and a tooth.

== Description ==
Enyo is called the "sister of War" (in Greek Polemos) by Quintus Smyrnaeus, in a role closely resembling that of Eris, the embodiment of strife and discord, with Homer, in particular, representing the two as the same. In some myths, she is identified as the mother of the war god Enyalius as well, and in these myths, Ares is indicated as the father, however, the masculine name Enyalius or Enyalios also may be used as a title for Ares.

As goddess of war, Enyo is responsible for orchestrating the destruction of cities, often accompanying Ares into battle. She is depicted as "supreme in war". She is so delighted in warfare that she even refused to take sides in the battle between Zeus and the monster Typhon:

Eris (Strife) was Typhon's escort in the mellee, Nike (Victory) led Zeus into battle… impartial Enyo held equal balance between the two sides, between Zeus and Typhon, while the thunderbolts with booming shots revel like dancers in the sky.

Enyo was involved in the war of the Seven against Thebes, and in Dionysus's war with the Indians as well. During the fall of Troy, Enyo inflicted terror and bloodshed in the war, along with Eris ("Strife"), Phobos ("Fear"), and Deimos ("Dread"), the latter two being sons of Ares. She, Eris, and the two sons of Ares are depicted on the shield of Achilles.

== Cult and iconography ==
At Thebes and Orchomenos, a festival entitled Homolôïa, which was celebrated in honour of Zeus, Demeter, Athena, and Enyo, was said to have received the surname of Homoloïus from Homoloïs, a priestess of Enyo. A statue of Enyo, made by the sons of Praxiteles, stood in the temple of Ares at Athens.

Her name might be preserved on the cornice of one of the friezes of the Gigantomachy altar, among those of fourteen others.
