= Molione (mythology) =

Greek mythological figure

In Greek mythology, Molione (Ancient Greek: Μολιόνη) or Moline (Μολίνη) was a member of the Aetolian royal family.

== Family ==
Moline was the daughter of Molus of Aetolia. She became the mother of the Molionides (Eurytus and Cteatus) either by King Actor of Elis or by Poseidon. Her sons were born with their bodies grown together.

== Mythology ==
When the Molionides were murdered in an ambush by the hero Heracles, Moline devoted herself in detecting the unknown slayer. When she discovered him, the Eleans demanded satisfaction for the crime from the Argives, especially King Eurystheus, for at the time Heracles had his home at Tiryns. When the Argives refused them satisfaction (Eurystheus disclaimed responsibility for the misdeeds of Heracles whom he had banished), the Eleans as an alternative pressed the Corinthians entirely to exclude the Argive people from the Isthmian games. When they failed in this also, Moline is said to have laid curses on her countrymen, should they refuse to boycott the Isthmian festival. The curses of Moline are respected right down to the present day, and no athlete of Elis is wont to compete in the Isthmian games.

== Interpretation ==
Robert Graves in his The Greek Myths speculated the origin of the character of Molione:

"Molione is perhaps a title of the Elean Moon-goddess, the patroness of the Games, meaning ‘Queen of the Moly’; the moly being a herb which elsewhere defied moon-magic She was also known as Agamede (‘very cunning’); and this is the name of Augeias’s sorceress daughter, who ‘knew all the drugs that grow on earth’ (Homer: Iliad xi. 739–41)."
