= Evenus (son of Ares) =

God in Greek mythology

In Greek mythology, Evenus (/ɪˈviːnəs/; Ancient Greek: Εύηνος Eúēnos) a river-god of Aetolia as the son of the Titans Oceanus and Tethys.

== Family ==
In some accounts, Evenus was represented as a mortal prince or king as the son of Ares and princess Demonice, daughter of King Agenor of Pleuron. He was the brother of Molus, Pylus and Thestius.

Another version of the myth stated that Evenus was born from Ares and the Pleiad Sterope. Lastly, Heracles was also called Evenus' father in later versions of the myth.

Evenus married his niece Alcippe, daughter of King Oenomaus of Pisa (another son of Ares and Sterope) by whom he became the father of Marpessa.

== Mythology ==
When Idas, son of Aphareus, came from Messenia to ask for the hand of Marpessa, Evenus refused his request because he wanted her daughter to remain a virgin. Idas went to his father Poseidon and begged for the use of a winged chariot. Poseidon consented him the use of the chariot, and Idas abducted Marpessa away from a band of dancers and fled from Pleuron in Aetolia. Evenus, after chasing the couple for a long time and realizing he could not catch up to them, killed his horses and then drowned himself in a nearby river Lycormas and became immortal. The river was named later after him.

According to some writers, Evenus, like Oenomaus, used to set his daughter's suitors to run a chariot race with him, promising to bestow her on the winner; but he cut off the heads of his vanquished competitors and nailed them to the walls of his house.
