= Proschium =

Coordinates: 38°26′38″N 21°26′06″E

Proschium or Proschion (Ancient Greek: Πρόσχιον) was a town of ancient Aetolia, between the Achelous and the Evenus. It is said to have been founded by the Aeolians when they were removed from the Homeric Pylene higher up into the country. Proschium also laid claim to high antiquity, since it possessed a shrine said to have been dedicated by Heracles to his cupbearer Cyathus, whom he had unintentionally slain. It is clear, from a narrative of Thucydides, that Proschium lay west of Calydon and Pleuron, and at no great distance from the Achelous.

Its site is tentatively located near the modern Proph. Ilias, Kato Retsina.
