= Phobos (mythology) =

God of fear and panic in Greek mythology

- Personification of fear
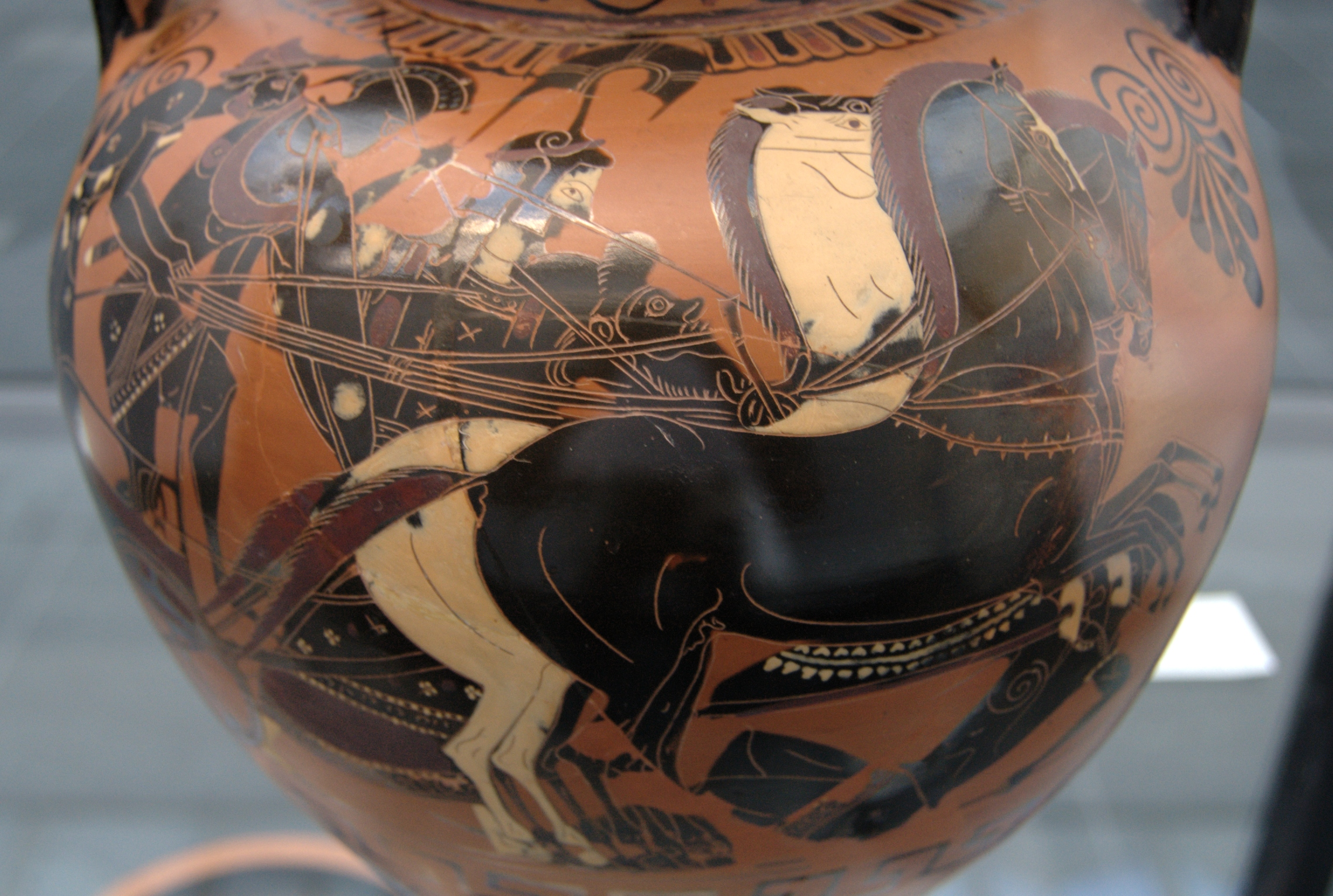
- Possibly Phobos and Ares in Ares's chariot (510-530 BCE).
- Abodes: Mount Olympus

Genealogy
- Parents: Ares and Aphrodite
- Siblings: Erotes, Deimos, Phlegyas, Harmonia, Enyalios, Thrax, Oenomaus, and Amazons

Phobos (Ancient Greek: Φόβος, lit. 'flight, fright', pronounced [pʰóbos], Latin: Phobus) is the god and personification of fear and panic in Greek mythology. Phobos was the son of Ares and Aphrodite, and the brother of Deimos. He does not have a major role in mythology outside of being his father's attendant.

In Classical Greek mythology, Phobos exists as both the god of and personification of the fear brought by war.

== Mythology ==
In Hesiod's Theogony, Phobos is the son of Ares and Aphrodite, and the sibling of Deimos and Harmonia. He mainly appears in an assistant role to his father and causes disorder in battle. In the Iliad, he accompanied his father into battle along with the goddess Eris (discord) and his brother Deimos (Dread). In Hesiod's Shield of Herakles, Phobos and Deimos accompany Ares into battle and remove him from the field once he is injured by Herakles. In Nonnus's Dionysiaca, Zeus arms Phobos with lightning and Deimos with thunder to frighten Typhon. Later in the work, Phobos and Deimos act as Ares's charioteers to battle the god Dionysus during his war against the Indians.

In the Seven Against Thebes by Aeschylus, the seven warriors slaughter a bull over a black shield and then "...touching the bull's gore with their hands they swore an oath by Ares, by Enyo, and by Rout [Phobos]". According to Stesichorus, Ares's son, Kyknos, "...beheaded strangers who came along in order to build a temple to Phobos (fear) from the skulls."

== Depictions ==
Hesiod depicts Phobos on the shield of Heracles as "…staring backwards with eyes that glowed with fire. His mouth was full of teeth in a white row, fearful and daunting…"

Phobos often is depicted as having a lion's or lion-like head. This may be seen in Description of Greece by Pausanias, "On the shield of Agamemnon is Phobos (Fear), who[se] head is a lion's…".

== Worship ==
Plutarch makes reference to a shrine to Phobos at Sparta, in addition to shrines dedicated to Death (Thanatos) and Laughter (Gelos), and he claimed that the Spartans honoured fear as a positive force that held the state together. Pausanias, writing during Imperial Rome, noted that the temple dedicated to Phobos was located outside of the city.

== The Iliad ==
There are many places within the Iliad, where Homer mentions the presence of Phobos and Deimos. Some references are:

Homer, Iliad 11. 36 ff:"[The shield of Agamemnon:] And he took up the man-enclosing elaborate stark shield, a thing of splendour. There were ten circles of bronze upon it, and set about it were twenty knobs of tin, pale-shining, and in the very centre another knob of dark cobalt. And circled in the midst of all was the blank-eyed face of the Gorgo (Gorgon) with her stare of horror, and Deimos (Dread) was inscribed upon it, and Phobos (Fear).

Homer, Iliad 15. 119 ff:"So he [Ares] spoke, and ordered Deimos (Dread) and Phobos (Fear) to harness his horses, and himself got into his shining armour."

== Historical reference ==
According to Plutarch, Alexander the Great offered sacrifices to Phobos on the eve of the Battle of Gaugamela (in all probability asking for Darius to be filled with fear). This was believed by Mary Renault to be part of Alexander's psychological warfare campaign against Darius III. Darius fled from the field of Gaugamela, making Alexander's praying to Phobos seem successful as a tactic.

Phobos was depicted on the chest of Cypselus on the shield of Agamemnon.

== Astronomy ==
In 1877, the American astronomer Asaph Hall discovered the two satellites of the planet Mars. Hall named the two moons Phobos and Deimos after the Greek mythological figures. Phobos is the larger of the two satellites.

== Psychology ==
The word "phobia" derives from phobos, (Φόβος), meaning irrational fear.
