= Aphrodite Areia =

Ancient Greek mythological epithet

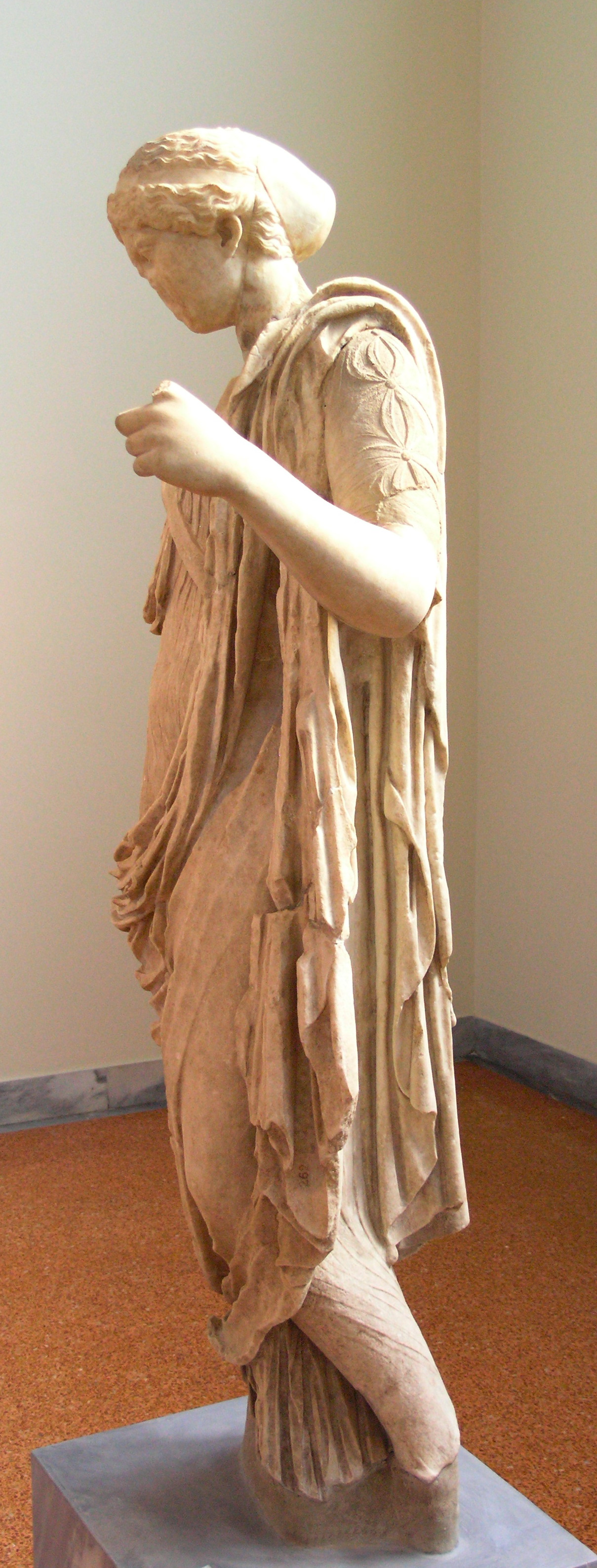
A Roman copy of a statue of Aphrodite Areia found in Epidaurus, with the original created by the Polykleitos school.

Aphrodite Areia (Ancient Greek: Ἀφροδίτη Ἀρεία) or "Aphrodite the Warlike" was a cult epithet of the Greek goddess Aphrodite, in which she was depicted in full armor like the war god Ares. This representation was found in Sparta and Taras (modern Taranto). There were other, similarly martial interpretations of the goddess, such as at her Sanctuary at Kythira, where she was worshiped under the epithet Aphrodite Urania, who was also represented as being armed. The epithet "Areia", meaning "warlike", was applied to other gods in addition to Aphrodite, such as Athena, Zeus, and possibly Hermes.

The association with warfare contradicts Aphrodite's more popularly known role as the goddess of desire, fertility, and beauty. In the Iliad, Aphrodite is portrayed as incompetent in battle, being wounded in the wrist by Diomedes under the guidance of Athena, and she is reminded of her role as a love goddess rather than a war goddess like Athena by Zeus. It is possible, however, that this representation was deliberate to assert the Ionian interpretation of Aphrodite, which did not portray the goddess with warlike aspects, as the "correct" version.

== Origins ==
It is believed that the warlike depiction of Aphrodite belongs to her very earliest acolytes and cults in Cyprus and Cythera, where there was a strong eastern influence during the Orientalizing Period. This depiction can trace Aphrodite's descent from older Middle Eastern goddesses such as the Sumerian Inanna, Mesopotamian Ishtar, and Phoenician Astarte. In Cyprus, Aphrodite was also referred to by the epithet "Aphrodite Encheios" (Aphrodite with a spear), and it has been suggested that the cult was brought from Cyprus to Sparta. She was also known by this name on the Areopagus and at Corinth.

== Cult in Greece ==
There were cults dedicated to the warlike aspect of Aphrodite in Kythira, Cyprus, Argos, Taras and most prominently in Sparta.^{[1]}

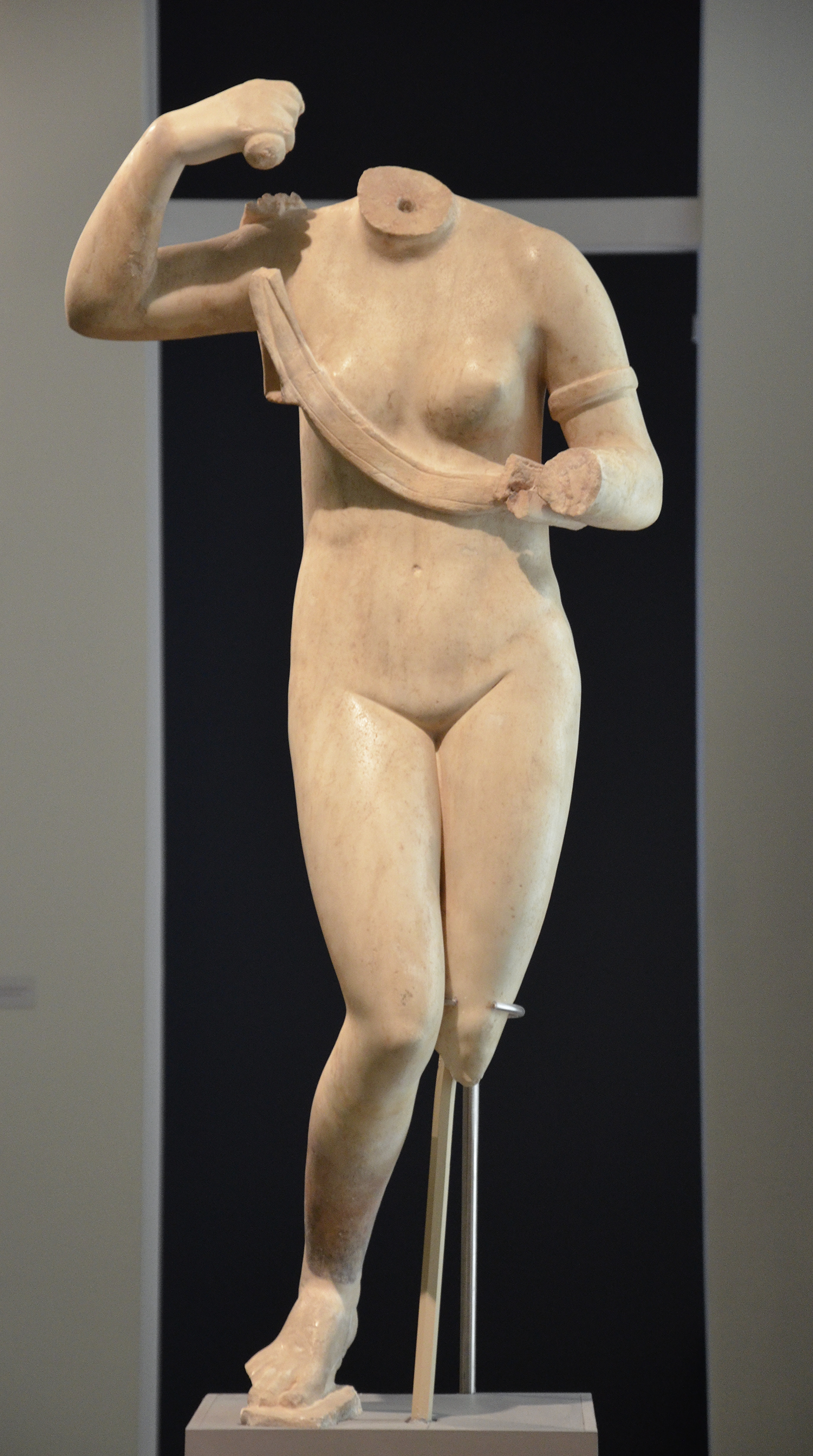
Aphrodite in Cyprus Museum.

Pausanias recorded that three cult statues at Kythira, Sparta, and Corinth depicted Aphrodite as holding weapons and archaeological evidence points to this portrayal also occurring in Argos. In Sparta, he described two temples dedicated to Aphrodite Areia. Pausanias' claim that "Aphrodite Areia" was simply a female version of Ares has some support in the contemporary epigraphy.

Various authors make reference to Sparta worshipping an armoured Aphrodite, such as Plutarch, Nonnos, and Quintilian. A related Spartan epithet, "Armed Aphrodite" (Ἀφροδίτη Ἐνόπλιος) was associated with an aetiological myth recorded by Lactantius, who stated that once the Spartan army was away from the city attacking Messene, part of the Messene army launched a counterattack against Sparta that was thwarted by the Spartan women who armed themselves and defended the city. The Spartan army, realizing their city was under siege, returned and assumed that the women were the enemy army until they stripped off their armour to reveal their identities. It is likely that this myth was used to explain the origin of an unknown Spartan festival that functioned similarly to the Argive festival of Hybristica, where women took over the roles of men.

In Argos, Aphrodite Areia appears to be related to Nikephoros ("victory bearer") and in a nearby city of Manteneia, there was a temple devoted to both Aphrodite and Ares.

== See also ==
- Aphrodite Urania
- Aphrodite Pandemos
- Greek words for love
- Colour wheel theory of love
