= Enyalius =

Ancient Greek war god

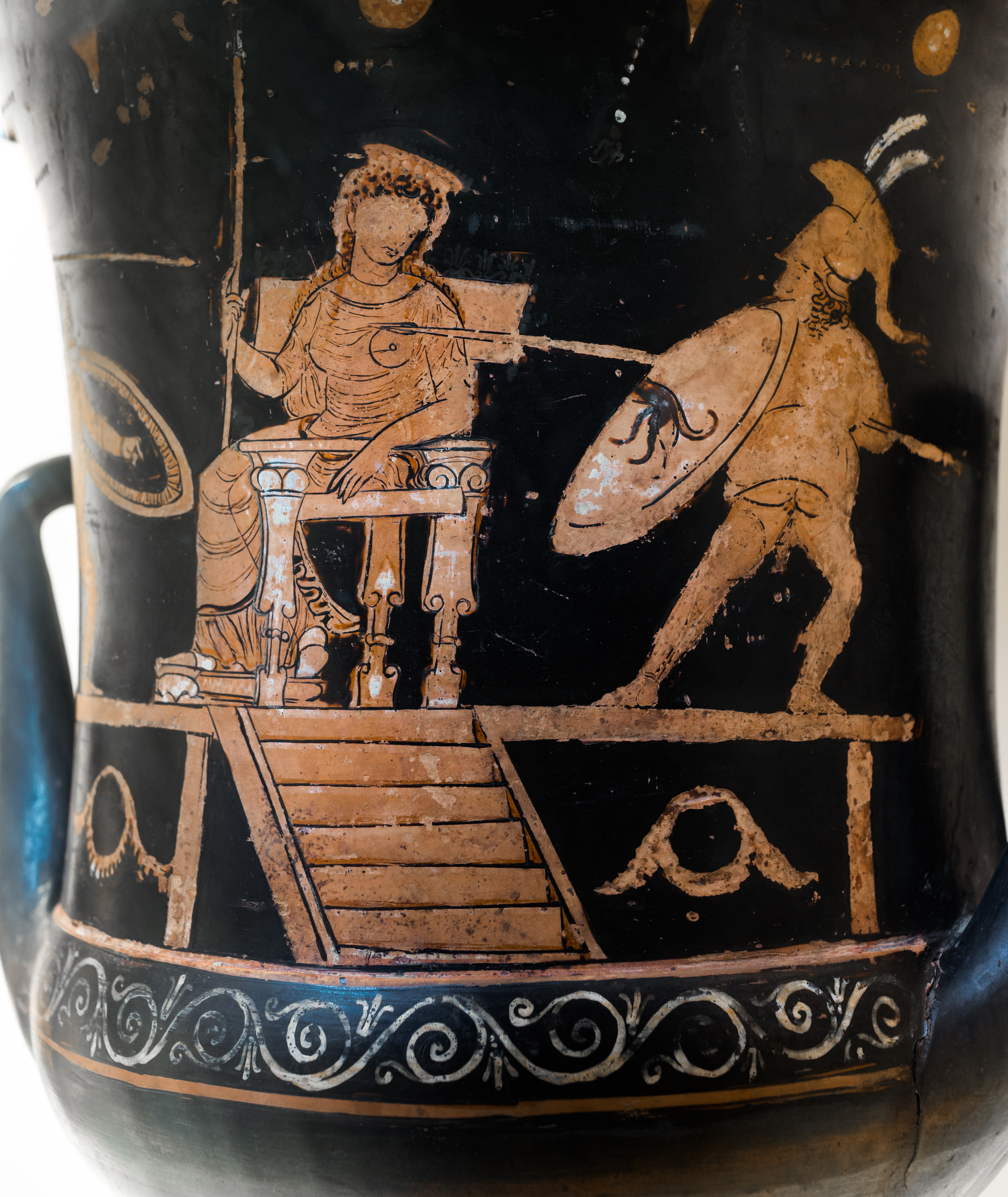
Hera and Enyalius (Ares) who fights against Daedalus (Hephaestus) on an Apulian red-figure calyx krater, ca. 350-340 BC, British Museum.

In ancient Greek mythology and religion, Enyalius (Ancient Greek: Ἐνυάλιος, romanized: Enuálios, lit. 'warlike') is a war deity, either as an aspect of Ares or a separate god of combat. The identification of the two gods is early, as they are already interchangeable in the epic Iliad (eighth century BC). Some later authors when presenting Enyalius as distinct from Ares, they make him his son or his foe. Enyalius appears to have received some worship, but it is hard to tell how distinct it was from Ares' own.

In Roman religion, he was identified with Quirinus, a martial god associated with the war-god Mars, the Roman equivalent of Ares.

== Etymology ==
Enyalius is first attested in the Mycenaean KN V 52 tablet, written in Linear B as 𐀁𐀝𐀷𐀪𐀍 (e-nu-wa-ri-jo), a word that is generally accepted to refer to him. If Enyalius is taken to be the same as Ares, then this tablet is also attestation of Ares' own worship during Bronze Age Greece, though he is also attested under his usual name as well as Ares-derived theonyms. It has been suggested that the name of Enyalius ultimately represents an Anatolian loanword, although alternative hypotheses treat it as an inherited Indo-European compound or a borrowing from an indigenous language of Crete.

== Enyalius and Ares ==
Enyalius was certainly an ancient figure, as he appears in Mycenaean records. In surviving literary texts, Enyalius is usually a byname for the Greek god of war Ares, without much identity of his own, though there are some hints of an independent presence. Different names could often refer to the same deity, as was the case with several other gods and their bynames. Although commonly used in the Iliad, it is nowhere to be found in the Odyssey. The early poet Alcman seems to have identified Ares with Enyalius at times, while at others kept them separate. In Aristophanes' comedy Peace (produced 421 BC), the two gods appear to be separate.

Authors who tried to construct a mythic identity for Enyalius made him a son of Ares and fellow war-deity Enyo, or alternatively of the Titans Cronus and Rhea (Ares' grandparents). Mythological narratives that attempted to differentiate between the two are usually late.

Eustathius of Thessalonica, quoting Arrian, recorded a myth in which Enyalius was a man dwelling in Thrace whom young Ares once visited as a guest. Enyalius refused to offer him xenia (hospitality), on account of only hosting those stronger than him in war. Ares responded that indeed he was, but Enyalius refused him again. In the end the two of them engaged in a long-drawn fight, where Enyalius was struck dead by Ares' long sword, and thus Ares got the epithet "Enyalius" in the same manner Athena had gotten her own epithet 'Pallas' after slaying an enemy.

== Worship ==
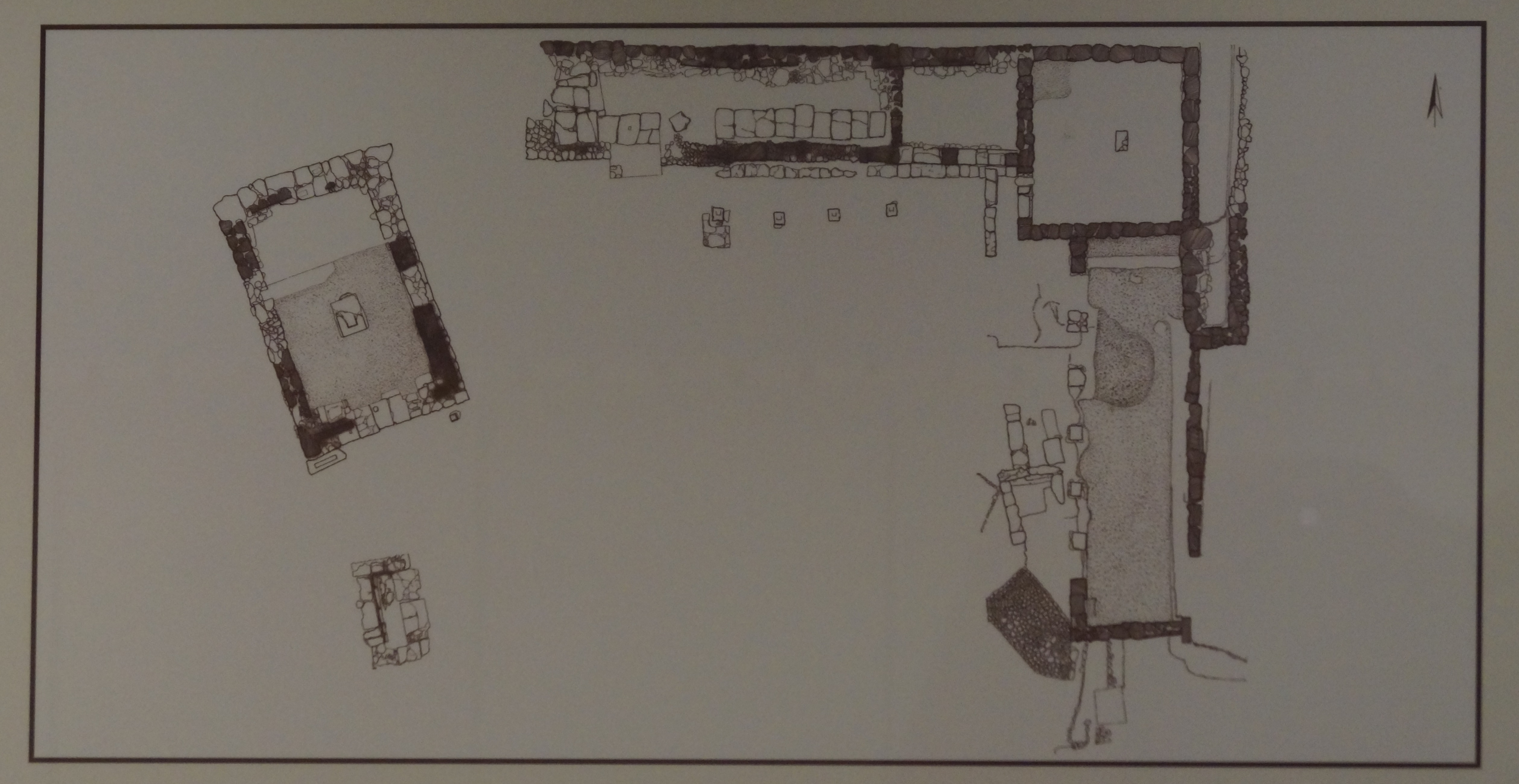
Plan of the sanctuary of Enyalius at Mycenae.

As a deity of close combat, he was called upon when the battle was about to begin, in as far as his distinction from Ares could stand. Along with Ares, he was invoked in a paean which the strategos began, joined by the soldiers. and also in the war cry that resounded when the frontlines aligned their spears for the initial charge. Otherwise there is not much evidence about his public worship, which was tied to that of Ares.

The Argive Telesilla erected a statue to Enyalius in honour of the women who took up arms in the defence of the city and successfully repelled the Spartan army after suffering many losses. Pausanias writes that Spartan youths sacrificed puppies to Ares under the epithet Enyalius, and dog sacrifices were also recorded in Lindos. Also at Sparta, near the temple of Hipposthenes, stood a fettered statue of Enyalius; fettered because the Spartans felt that this way he would never leave the city, in the same way the Athenians depicted Nike wingless so that she could not fly away.

Dionysius of Halicarnassus wrote that the Romans equated Enyalius with their own Quirinus, a martial god who received similar honours to Mars, Ares' Roman counterpart, and that those two gods were at times interchangeable and at others not.

== See also ==
- Polemos
- Alala
- Bellona

== Bibliography ==
- Aristophanes, Peace, in The Complete Greek Drama, vol. 2. Eugene O'Neill, Jr. New York. Random House. 1938. Available at Perseus Digital Library.
- Bulkert, Walter (1985). Greek Religion. Harvard University Press. ISBN 0-674-36281-0.
- Chadwick, John (1976). The Mycenaean World. Cambridge, UK: Cambridge University Press. ISBN 0-521-29037-6.
- Dionysius of Halicarnassus, Roman Antiquities, Volume I: Books 1-2. Translated by Earnest Cary. Loeb Classical Library 319. Cambridge, MA: Harvard University Press, 1937. Available at Loeb Classical Library.
- Edmonds, John Maxwell (1922). Lyra Graeca. W. Heinemann.
- Eustathius, Commentary on Homer's Iliad, d. ca. 1194; Stallbaum, Gottfried, 1793-1861. Internet Archive.
- Gantz, Timothy (1993). Early Greek Myth: A Guide to Literary and Artistic Sources. Vol. I. Johns Hopkins University Press. ISBN 978-0-8018-5360-9.
- Gordon, Richard L. (October 1, 2006). "Enyalius". In Cancik, Hubert; Schneider, Helmuth (eds.). Brill's New Pauly. Translated by Christine F. Salazar. Ilmmünster: Brill Reference Online. ISSN 1574-9347.
- Hard, Robin (2004). The Routledge Handbook of Greek Mythology: Based on H. J. Rose's "Handbook of Greek Mythology". Routledge. ISBN 9780415186360.
- Pausanias, Description of Greece with an English Translation by W.H.S. Jones, Litt.D., and H.A. Ormerod, M.A., in 4 Volumes. Cambridge, MA, Harvard University Press; London, William Heinemann Ltd. 1918. Online version at the Perseus Digital Library.
- Plutarch, Mulierum Virtutes in Moralia, with an English Translation by. Frank Cole Babbitt. Cambridge, MA. Harvard University Press. London. William Heinemann Ltd. 1931. 3. Available at Perseus Digital Library.
- Smith, William (1873). A Dictionary of Greek and Roman Biography and Mythology. London, UK: John Murray, printed by Spottiswoode and Co. Online version at the Perseus.tufts library.
- Yakubovich, Ilya (2021). "The Anatolian Connections of the Greek God Enyalius". In Bianconi, M. (ed.). Linguistic and Cultural Interactions between Greece and Anatolia. Leiden: BRILL. doi:10.1163/9789004461598_012. ISBN 9789004461598. S2CID 243740039.
