= Demonice =

Two figures in Greek mythology

In Greek mythology, Demonice (/ˌdɛməˈnaɪsiː/; Ancient Greek: Δημονίκη, romanized: Dēmonī́kē) is the name of two women.

- Demonice, daughter of Agenor of Pleuron.
- Demonice, a maiden of Ephesus. Brennus, king of the Gauls who was razing Asia Minor came to Ephesus and fell in love with Demonice. She promised to yield to him, and also to betray her country, if he would give her golden bracelets and the jewels of the Gaulish women. Brennus told his soldiers to throw into her lap the gold they were wearing, and she was buried alive.
