= Ambologera =

Ancient Greek mythological epithet

Ambologera (Ancient Greek: Ἀμβολογήρα) was a cultic epithet (term used to characterize) of the Greek goddess Aphrodite, from the Greek ἀναβάλλω and γῆρας, "delaying old age". She had a statue on the acropolis at Sparta under this name, although as there is only one surviving mention of this epithet, from Pausanias' Description of Greece, the precise nature of this cult is uncertain. Some scholars have speculated that Aphrodite Ambologera was proof of Aphrodite's identification with the mandrake plant, which was thought in ancient times to have aphrodisiac powers.
