= Pelopia =

In Greek mythology, Pelopia or Pelopea or Pelopeia (Ancient Greek: Πελόπεια) was a name attributed to four individuals:

- Pelopia, a Theban princess as one of the Niobids, children of King Amphion and Niobe, daughter of King Tantalus of Lydia. She was slain by Artemis.
- Pelopia, daughter of Pelias, King of Iolcus by either Anaxibia or Phylomache, daughter of Amphion. She appears briefly in the Argonautica, giving her brother Acastus a mantle of double fold before he sails off with the Argonauts. She and her sisters killed their father, having been tricked by Medea into believing this was needed to rejuvenate him.
- Pelopia, mother of Cycnus by Ares.
- Pelopia, daughter of Thyestes by whom she mothered Aegisthus.
