= Pylene =

Coordinates: 38°28′26″N 21°22′23″E

Pylene (Ancient Greek: Πυλήνη) was a town of ancient Aetolia, between the Acheolous and the Evenus, mentioned in Homer's Catalogue of Ships in the Iliad, is placed by Pliny the Elder on the Corinthian Gulf. It would therefore seem to have existed in later times. Strabo says that the Aeolians who took Pylene afterwards removed higher up into the country and founded Proschium.

Its site is tentatively located near the modern Magoula/Aitolikon.
