= Aphrodite Pandemos =

Divine epithet of Aphrodite

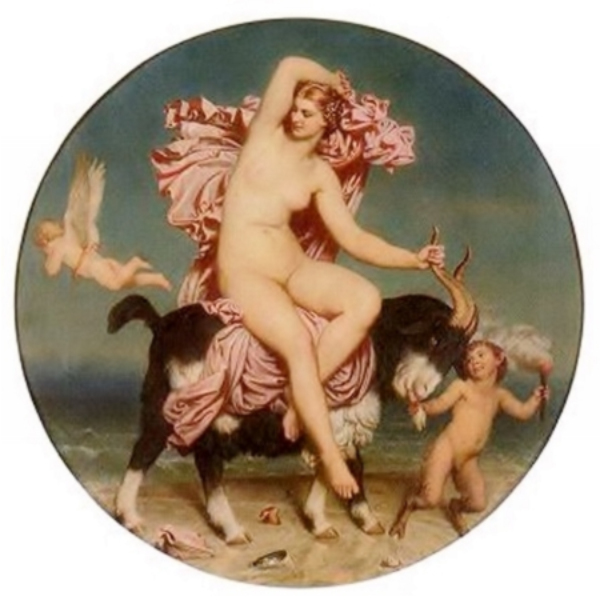
Venus Pandemos (Charles Gleyre, 1854)

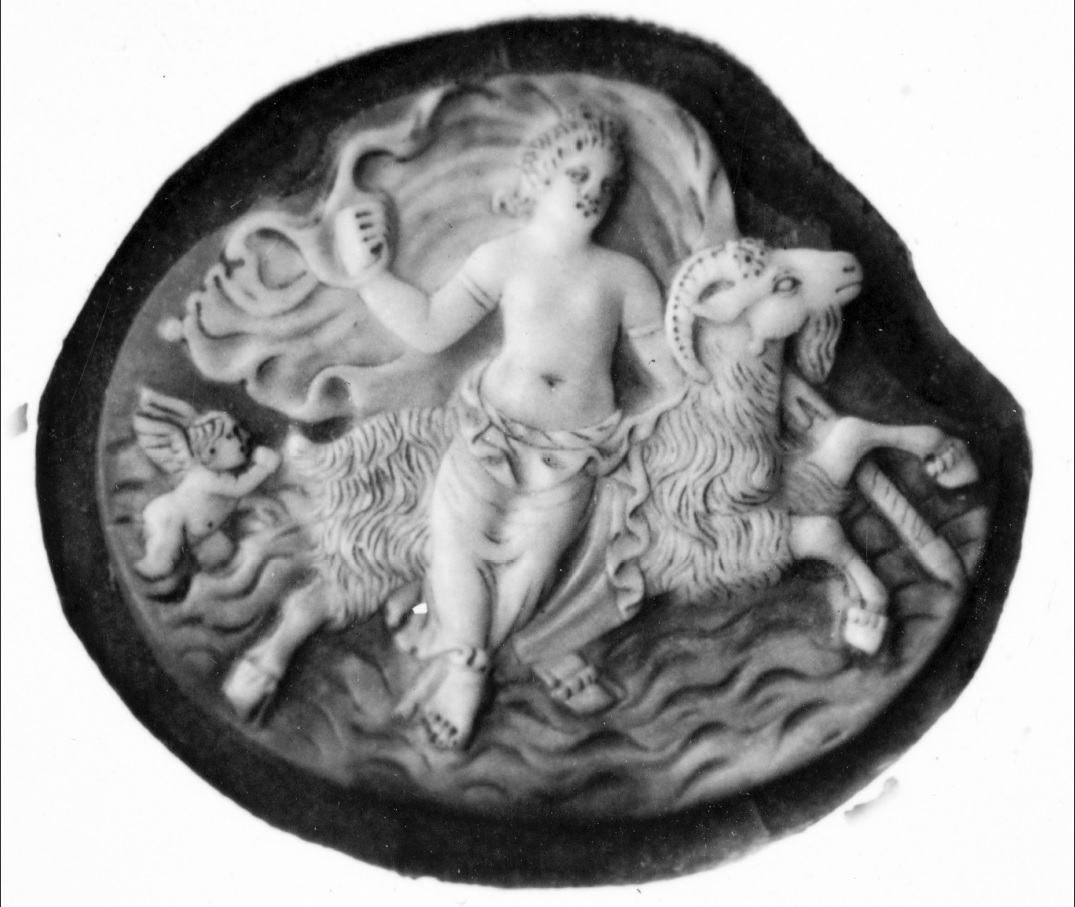
Roman cameo, 1st century BC - 2nd century, National Museum of Naples.

Aphrodite Pandemos (Ancient Greek: Πάνδημος, romanized: Pándēmos; "common to all the people") occurs as an epithet of the Greek goddess Aphrodite. This epithet can be interpreted in different ways. In Plato's Symposium, Pausanias of Athens describes Aphrodite Pandemos as the goddess of sensual pleasures, in opposition to Aphrodite Urania, or "the heavenly Aphrodite". At Elis, she was represented as riding on a ram by Scopas. Another interpretation is that of Aphrodite uniting all the inhabitants of a country into one social or political body. In this respect she was worshipped at Athens along with Peitho (persuasion), and her worship was said to have been instituted by Theseus at the time when he united the scattered townships into one great body of citizens. According to some authorities, it was Solon who erected the sanctuary of Aphrodite Pandemos, either because her image stood in the agora, or because the hetairai had to pay the costs of its erection. The worship of Aphrodite Pandemos also occurs at Megalopolis in Arcadia, and at Thebes. A festival in honour of her is mentioned by Athenaeus. The sacrifices offered to her consisted of white goats. Pandemos occurs also as a surname of Eros. According to Harpocration, who quotes Apollodorus, Aphrodite Pandemos has very old origins, "the title Pandemos was given to the goddess established in the neighborhood of the Old Agora because all the Demos (people) gathered there of old in their assemblies which they called agorai." To honour Aphrodite's and Peitho's role in the unification of Attica, the Aphrodisia festival was organized annually on the fourth of the month of Hekatombaion (the fourth day of each month was the sacred day of Aphrodite). The Synoikia that honoured Athena, the protectress of Theseus and main patron of Athens, also took place in the month of Hekatombaion.

Christine Downing comments that, "Pausanias's description of the love associated with Aphrodite Pandemos as dedicated only to sensual pleasure and therefore directed indifferently to women and men, and that associated with the Ouranian Aphrodite as "altogether male" and dedicated to the education of the soul of the beloved is actually an innovation—for Aphrodite Ourania was served in Corinth by prostitutes and Aphrodite Pandemos was the goddess as worshipped by the whole community."

The goddess riding on a goat was also known as Aphrodite Epitragia, "from a she-goat". According to Plutarch, she acquired this epithet from an episode in the life of Theseus when the hero sacrificed a goat to Aphrodite before departing for Crete in hopes that she would guide him on his voyage. As Theseus sacrificed the customary she-goat, the animal was suddenly transformed into a male goat.

== See also ==
- Aphrodite Areia
- Aphrodite Urania
- Greek words for love
- Colour wheel theory of love
