= Deimos (deity) =

Personification of fear in Greek mythology

- Personification of fear
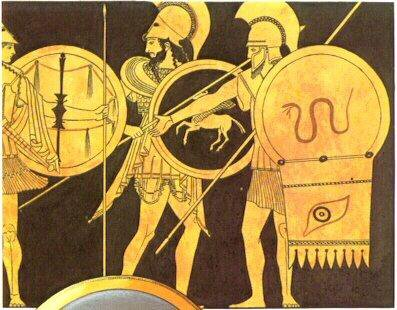
- A painting of Phobos and Deimos

Genealogy
- Parents: Ares and Aphrodite
- Siblings: Phobos, Harmonia

In Greek mythology, Deimos /ˈdaɪmɒs/ (Ancient Greek: Δεῖμος, lit. 'fear' , and δειμός (deimós, “terror, dread”) pronounced [dêːmos]) is the personification of dread and terror. He is the son of Ares and Aphrodite, and the brother of Phobos.

In Ancient Greek mythology, Deimos represented the terror and dread before the arrival of war.

== Genealogy ==
In Hesiod's Theogony, Deimos is the son of Ares and Cytherea (Aphrodite), and the sibling of Phobos and Harmonia. According to the Greek antiquarian Semus of Delos, Deimos is the father of the monster Scylla.

== Mythology ==
Deimos mainly appears in an assistant role to his father, who causes disorder in armies. In the Iliad, he accompanied his father, Ares, into battle with the Goddess of Discord, Eris, and his brother Phobos (fear). Deimos is also depicted on Agamemnon's shield alongside his brother Phobos. In the Shield of Heracles, Phobos and Deimos accompany Ares into battle and remove him from the field once Heracles injures him. The poet Antimachus, in a misrepresentation of Homer's account, portrays Deimos and Phobos as the horses of Ares. In Nonnus's Dionysiaca, Zeus arms Phobos with lightning and Deimos with thunder to frighten Typhon. Later in the work, Phobos and Deimos act as Ares's charioteers to battle Dionysus during his war against the Indians.

== Namesake ==
In 1877, the American astronomer Asaph Hall discovered the two satellites of the planet Mars. Hall named the two moons Phobos and Deimos. Deimos is the smaller of the two satellites.
