= Aphrodite Urania =

Epithet and cult identity of Aphrodite

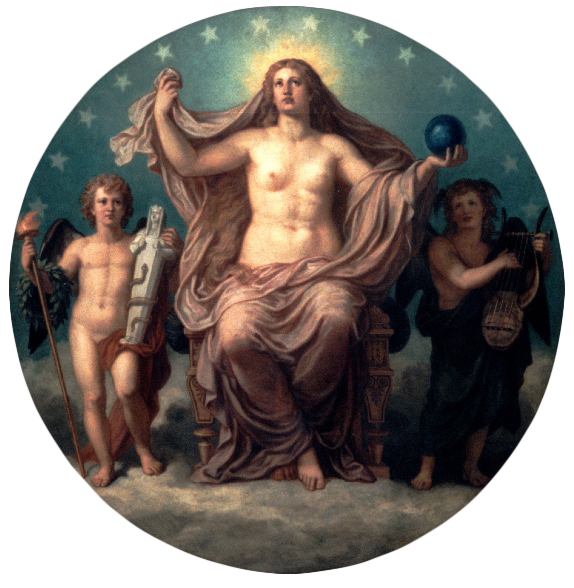
Venus Urania (Christian Griepenkerl, 1878)

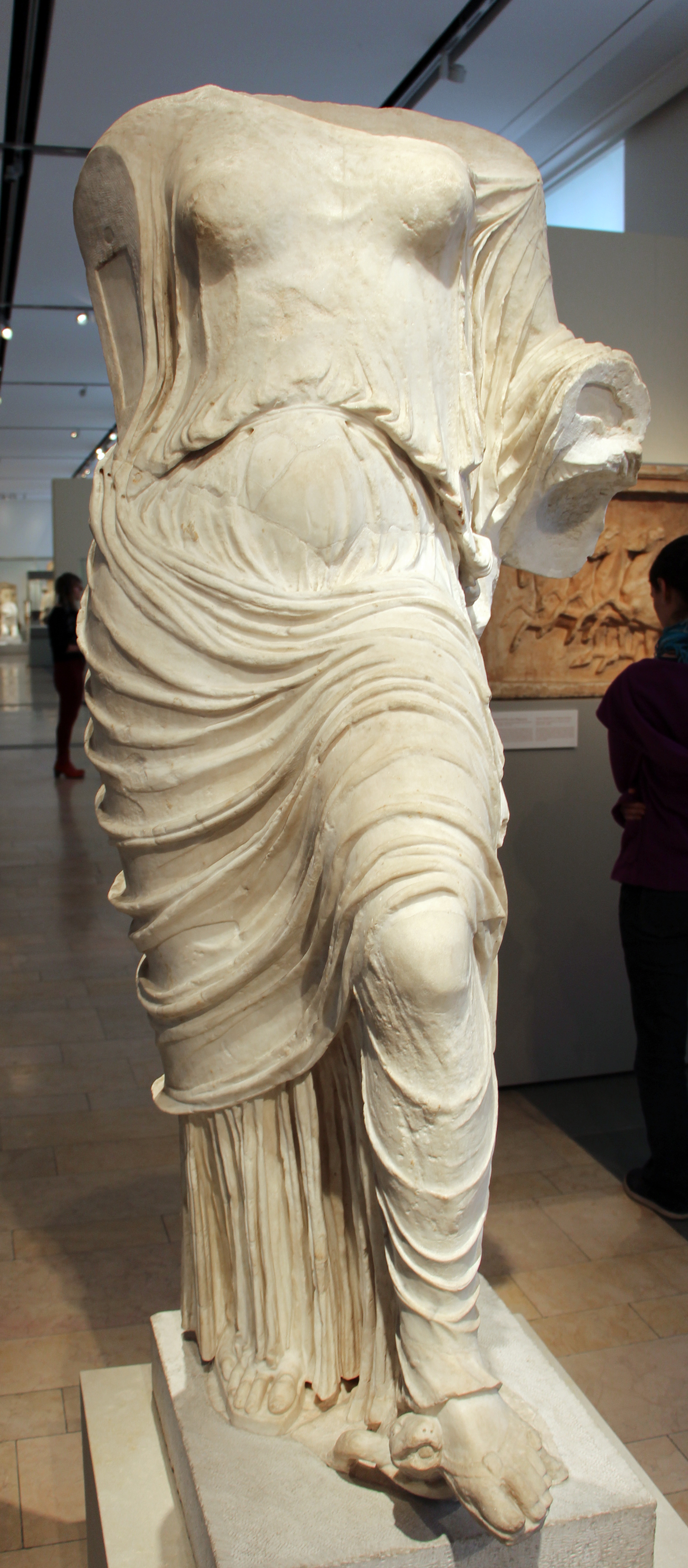
Statue of the so-called 'Aphrodite on a tortoise', 430–420 BCE, Athens (Note: "In the temple is the image of the goddess whom they call Ourania; it is made of ivory and gold and is the work of Pheidias; it stands with one foot upon a tortoise" — Pausanias [The tortoise was a symbol of domestic modesty and chastity.])

Aphrodite Urania (Ancient Greek: Ἀφροδίτη Οὐρανία, romanized: Aphrodítē Ouranía, Latinized as Venus Urania) was an epithet of the Greek goddess Aphrodite, signifying a "heavenly" or "spiritual" aspect descended from the sky-god Uranus to distinguish her from the more earthly epithet of Aphrodite Pandemos, "Aphrodite for all the people". The two were used (mostly in literature) to differentiate the more "celestial" love of body and soul from purely physical lust. Plato represented her as a daughter of the Greek god Uranus, conceived and born without a mother. Hesiod described this aspect as being born from the severed genitals of Uranus and emerging from the sea foam.

== Etymology and names ==
According to Herodotus, the Arabs called this aspect of the goddess "Alitta" or "Alilat" (Ἀλίττα or Ἀλιλάτ).

The most distinctively Western Asian title of the Greek Aphrodite is Urania, the Semitic "queen of the heavens". It has been explained by reference to the lunar character of the goddess, but more probably signifies "she whose seat is in heaven", whence she exercises her sway over the whole world—earth, sea, and air alike.

== Significance alongside other epithets ==
Aphrodite Pandemos was originally an extension of the idea of the goddess Aphrodite to family and city life to include the whole people, the political community. Hence the name was supposed to go back to the time of Theseus, the reputed author of the reorganization of Attica and its demes. Aphrodite Pandemos was held in equal regard with Urania; she was called σεμνή semnē (holy), and was served by priestesses upon whom strict chastity was enjoined. In time, however, the meaning of the term underwent a change, probably due to the philosophers and moralists, by whom a radical distinction was drawn between Aphrodite Urania and Pandemos.

=== The Symposium ===
According to Pausanias's dialogue in Plato's Symposium, there are two goddesses named Aphrodite, "the elder, having no mother, who is called Aphrodite Urania (heavenly or spiritual), she is the daughter of Uranus; the younger, who is called the Aphrodite Pandemos (terrenal or common), she is the daughter of Zeus and Dione." Pandemos was equated by Pausanias with sexual gratification and attraction towards the body of a lover, born of a man and woman and embodying attraction towards women and boys, while Urania was associated with a nobler attraction to the mind and soul, born without the involvement of a woman and embodying attraction towards young men.

The same distinction is found in Xenophon although the author is doubtful whether there are two goddesses, or whether Urania and Pandemos are two names for the same goddess, just as Zeus, although one and the same, has many titles; but in any case, he says, the ritual of Urania is "purer, more serious", than that of Pandemos. The same idea is expressed in the statement that after Solon's time courtesans were put under the protection of Aphrodite Pandemos. But there is no doubt that the cult of Aphrodite was on the whole as "pure" as that of any other divinities, and although a distinction may have existed in later times between the goddess of legal marriage and the goddess of free love, the titles Urania and Pandemos do not express that idea.

Homosexual artists and activists in the Early Modern and Victorian eras would further emphasize the distinction between attractions towards men versus women, leading to the adoption of "Uranian" as a term for male homosexuality. The term would be used by many homosexual figures such as Karl Heinrich Ulrichs or Oscar Wilde to describe what they saw as the nobility and legitimacy of "uranian love".

=== Anadyomene ===
Hesiod's description of Urania's birth from the sea foam was artistically depicted through a widespread motif of Venus Anadyomene ("Venus Rising from the Sea"), an epithet notably revived during the Renaissance with works such as Sandro Botticelli's The Birth of Venus.

== Worship and iconography ==
Her cult was first established in Cythera, probably in connection with the purple trade, and at Athens it is associated with the legendary Porphyrion, the purple king. At Thebes, Harmonia (who has been identified as Aphrodite herself) dedicated three statues: of Aphrodite Urania, Pandemos, and Apotrophia. (Note: Ἀφροδίτη Ἀποτροφία, Aphrodítē Apotrophía means "Aphrodite the Expeller", because in this role, she expels lust and evil desires from the hearts of men.)

Wine was not used in the libations offered to her.

Aphrodite Urania was represented in Greek art on a swan, a tortoise or a globe.

== See also ==
- Temple of Aphrodite Urania
- Aphrodite Areia
- Aphrodite Pandemos
- Greek words for love
- Colour wheel theory of love
