= Kwakwakaʼwakw mythology =

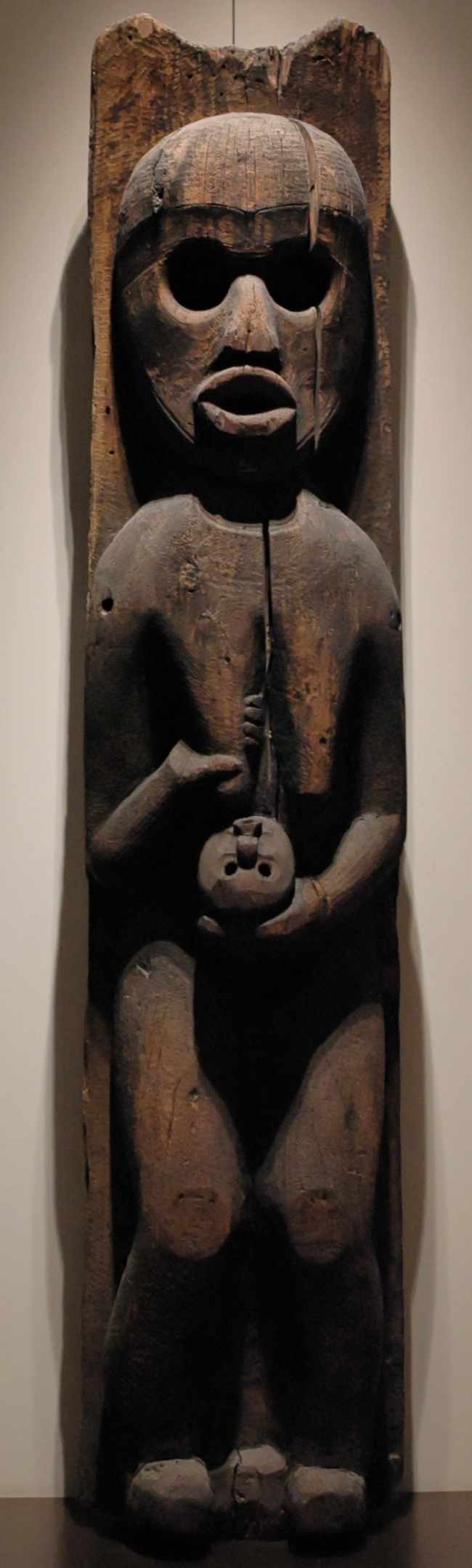
Kwakwakaʼwakw house pole representing a female Dzunukwa, 19th century

The Kwakwakaʼwakw are a group of Indigenous nations, numbering about 5,500, who live in the central coast of British Columbia on northern Vancouver Island and the mainland. Kwakwakaʼwakw translates into "Kwakʼwala-speaking tribes." However, the individual tribes are single autonomous nations and do not view themselves collectively as one group.

These people share many common cultural customs with neighboring nations. They share beliefs in many of the same spirits and deities, although they speak different languages. Some spirits are, however, totally unique to one or two cultures and are not universally known throughout the Northwest Coast. Each tribe has its own history, practices, and stories. Some origin stories belong to only one specific tribe, while another tribe has its own stories. But many practices, rituals, and ceremonies occur throughout Kwakwakaʼwakw culture, and in some cases, neighboring indigenous cultures also.

== Creation stories ==
The Kwakwakaʼwakw creation narrative states that the world was created by a raven flying over water, who, finding nowhere to land, decided to create islands by dropping small pebbles into the water. He then created trees and grass, and, after several failed attempts, he made the first man and woman out of wood and clay.

=== Flood ===
Like all Indigenous peoples of the Pacific Northwest Coast, most of the Kwakwakaʼwakw tribes have stories about their people surviving the flood. With some of these nations, their history talks of their ancestors transforming into their natural form and disappearing while the waters rose, then subsided. For others, they have stories of their people attaching their oceangoing canoes to tall, peaking mountains. For the stories about supernatural powers, these figures tend to be the founding clans of some Kwakwakaʼwakw nations.

== Ancestors, crest, and clans ==
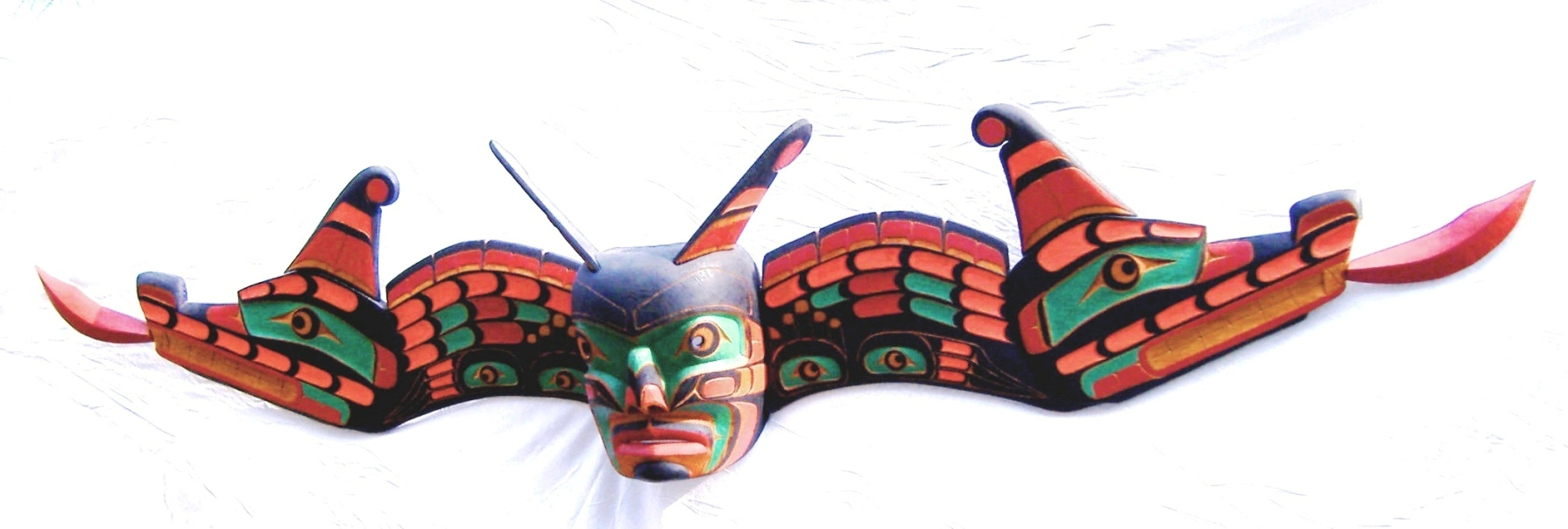
Kwakwakaʼwakw Cedar sisiutl mask

Tseiqami is a man who comes from the cedar tree and Thunderbird, lord of the winter dance season, a massive supernatural bird whose wing beats cause the thunder, and the flash of whose eyes causes lightning. Tseiqami hunts whales for its dinner out at sea, and sometimes helps heroic ancestors build houses by placing giant cedar beams for them. Thunderbird has a younger brother named Kolus.

Thunderbird's adversary is Qaniqilak, the spirit of the summer season, who is often identified as the sea god, Kumugwe. Kumugwe or Komokwa is the name of "Undersea Chief." Many Kwakwakaʼwakw families have been blessed by riches and supernatural treasures bestowed by this god of the tides and maker of coppers.

Sisiutl is a giant three-headed sea serpent whose glance can turn an adversary into stone. Cross beams of clan houses are sometimes carved with his appearance. Blessed ancestors have sometimes received sisiutl's help when he transforms himself into an invincible war canoe, and sometimes into a magic belt with which to gird oneself against all dangers.

Dzunukwa (Tsonokwa) is a type of cannibal giant (called sasquatch by other Northwest Coast tribes) and comes in both male and female forms. In most legends, the female form is the most commonly told; she eats children and cries "hu-hu!" to attract them, and she imitates the child's grandmother's voice. Children frequently outwit her, sometimes killing her and taking her treasures without being eaten.

Bakwas is king of the ghosts. He is a small green spirit whose face looks emaciated like a skeleton, but has a long, curving nose. He haunts the forests and tries to bring the living over to the world of the dead. In some myths, Bakwas is the husband of Dzunukwa.

Uʼmelth is the Raven, who brought the Kwakwakaʼwakw people the moon, fire, salmon, the sun and the tides.

Pugwis is a sort of aquatic creature with a fish-like face and large incisors.

== Ceremony ==
Kwakwakaʼwakw spirituality is transmitted at ceremonies, mostly during the winter season. These ceremonies are often referred to as potlatches. They are mostly designed for the transference, justification, and reaffirmation of family and spiritual status inherited from primeval ancestors who contacted the spirit world and were given privileges from beings of a supernatural nature. These beings prefer honor, power, and magic through the gift of Tlugwe, which are supernatural treasures, often taking the physical form of masks and regalia, but also comprising stories, songs, recitations, dances, and other intangible performances.

Kwakwakaʼwakw spirits, like those of other Northwest Coast peoples, can be divided into four separate spirit realms: sky spirits, sea spirits, earth spirits, and otherworldly spirits. All four realms interact with one another, and human beings attempt to contact all four worlds and often channel their spirits at sacred ceremonies wherein dancers go into trances while wearing masks and other regalia associated with the spirit world.

Of particular importance in Kwakwakaʼwakw culture is the secret society called Hamatsa. During the winter, there is a four-day complex dance that serves to initiate new members of Hamatsa. The Hamatsa dancer represents the spirit of Baxbaxwalanuksiwe ("Man-Eater at the North End of the World"); who can transform into various man-eating birds and has mouths all over his body. Hamatsa initiates are possessed by Baxwbakwalanukswe. On the first day of the Hamatsa ceremonies, the initiate is lured out of the woods and brought into the Big House to be tamed. When the initiate returns, he enacts his cannibalistic possession symbolically. Gwaxwgwakwalanuksiweʼ is the most prestigious role in the Supernatural Man-Eater Birds ceremony; he is a man-eating raven. Galuxwadzuwus ("Crooked-Beak of Heaven") and Huxhukw (supernatural Crane-Like Bird who cracks skulls of men to suck out their brains) are other participants.

== See also ==
- Kwakʼwala
- Sisiutl
- Winalagalis
- Dantsikw
