= Hong (rainbow-dragon) =

Two-headed dragon in Chinese mythology

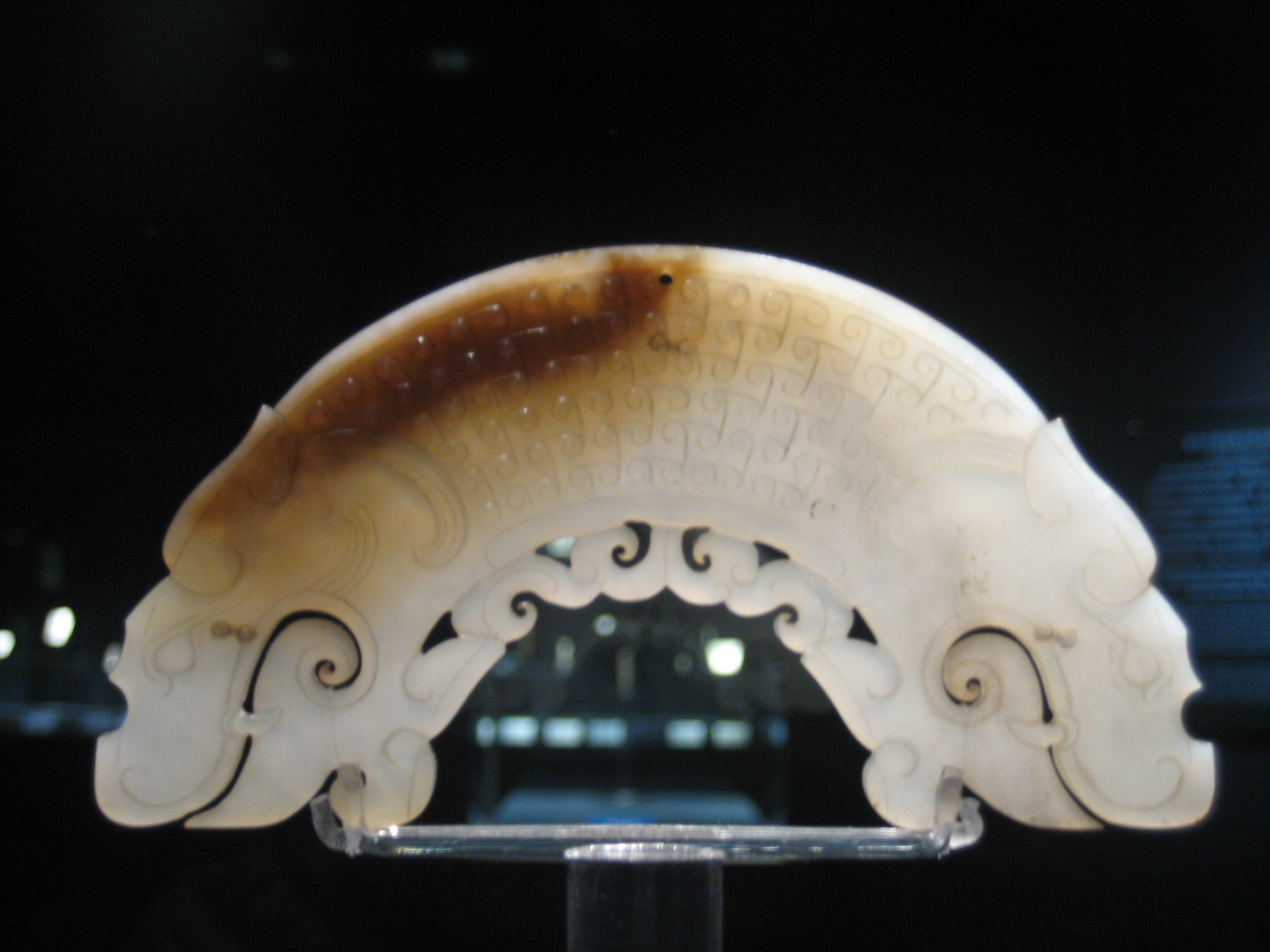
Warring States period jade pendant with two dragon heads

Hong or jiang (Chinese: 虹; pinyin: hóng or jiàng; Wade–Giles: hung or chiang; lit. 'rainbow') is a Chinese dragon with two heads on each end in Chinese mythology, comparable with Rainbow Serpent legends in various cultures and mythologies.

== Chinese "rainbow" names ==
Chinese has three words that mean "rainbow", regular hóng (虹), literary dìdōng (蝃蝀), and ní (蜺; "secondary rainbow").

Note that all these Chinese characters share a graphic element of hui (虫; "insect; worm; reptile; etc.") (cf. tripled chong (蟲), known in Chinese as Kangxi radical number 142 and loosely translated in English as the "insect radical". In traditional Chinese character classification, "radical-phonetic" or "phono-semantic" characters are statistically the most common category, and they combine a "radical" or determinative that suggests semantic field with a "phonetic" element that roughly indicates pronunciation. Words written with this 虫 radical typically name not only insects, but also reptiles, and other miscellaneous creatures, including some dragons such as shen (蜃; 'aquatic dragon') and jiao (蛟; 'flood dragon'). Linguistic anthropologists studying folk taxonomy discovered many languages have zoological categories similar to hui (虫), and Brown coined the portmanteau word wug (from worm + bug) meaning the class of "insects, worms, spiders, and smaller reptiles". Following Carr, "wug" is used as the English translation of the Chinese logographic radical 虫.

=== Hong ===
Oracle bone script for 虹; hong; 'rainbow'

Seal script for 虹; hong; 'rainbow'

The regular script Chinese character 虹 for hong or jiang "rainbow" combines the "wug radical" with a gong (工; "work") phonetic. Both Qin dynasty seal script and Zhou dynasty bronze script elaborated this same radical-phonetic combination. However, the oldest characters for "rainbow" in Shang dynasty oracle bone script were pictographs of an arched dragon or serpent with open-mouthed heads at both ends. Eberhard notes, "In early reliefs, the rainbow is shown as a snake or a dragon with two heads. In West China they give it the head of a donkey, and it rates as a lucky symbol."

The 121 CE Shuowen Jiezi dictionary, the first Chinese character dictionary, described the seal character for hong (虹; 'rainbow') as 狀似蟲; 'shaped like a wug'. Over 18 centuries later, Hopkins described the recently discovered oracle character for 虹.

What should we see in this simple but striking image? We should, I now feel sure, discern a Rainbow terminating in two animal heads. But of what animal? Certainly of the Dragon, must be the answer. For the design of the character is, in the main, naturalistic, in so far as it is clearly modeled on the semi-circular Bow in the sky, but symbolistic through the addition of two heads, for where the Rainbow ends, there the Dragon begins!

Hopkins elucidated.

It is the belief of the Chinese that the appearance of the Rainbow is at once the herald and the cause of the cessation of rain and the return of clear skies. … Now, if by his own volition, when mounting to the upper air, the Dragon could beget the rolling thunder and the drenching rain-storm, how should he not be able also, in descending, the cause the rain to cease, and the face of the blue sky to clear? And that is why I conjecture and suggest that the early Chinese must have seen in the Rainbow one avatar of the wonder-working Dragon as conceived by their animistic mentality. That would likewise explain why to the arching bow seen with their bodily eyes they added the Dragon heads beheld only by the eye of faith.

Jiang is an uncommon pronunciation of 虹, limited to colloquial or dialectal usage, and unlike hong not normally found in compounds. For instance, caihong (彩虹; "rainbow (with "color")") hongcai (虹彩; 'rainbow colors', 'iridescence', 'the iris', 'banners'), hongqiao (虹橋; "arch bridge (with "bridge")"), and hongxi (虹吸; "(with "absorb; suck up") "siphon")

=== Didong ===
Didong 蝃蝀 or 螮蝀 is a Classical Chinese word for "rainbow", now usually restricted to literary or historical usage. These three characters combine the "wug radical" with phonetics of zhuo (叕; 'connect') or dai (帶; 'girdle', 'sash') in di (蝃) or 螮 and dong (東; 'east') in dong (蝀).

=== Ni ===
Ni 蜺 or 霓 means "secondary rainbow" or "supernumerary rainbow", which results from double reflection of sunlight, with colors inverted from a primary rainbow (see Alexander's band). These characters combine a phonetic of er (兒; 'child') with either the "wug radical" 虫 or the "rain radical" 雨. Ni (蜺) can also mean hanchan (寒蟬) "winter cicada", which is a "silent, mute" metaphor.

While hongni (虹霓) means "primary and secondary rainbows; rainbows", nihong (霓虹) is a loanword from English neon in expressions like nihongdeng (霓虹燈; 'neon light'), compare the chemical loanword nai (氖; 'neon', 'Ne'). Fuhong (副虹) (with "second; subsidiary") means "secondary rainbow" in Chinese meteorological terminology.

== Early textual references ==
Chinese classic texts dating from the Spring and Autumn period (8th–5th centuries BCE) and Warring States period (5th–3rd centuries BCE) referred to hong, didong, and ni rainbows.

The Shijing has the oldest known textual usages of hong and didong, and both are bad omens. One poem uses 虹, which is interpreted as a loan character for hong (訌; "(with the "speech radical" 言) "disorder; conflict; quarrel"): "That kid with horns was truly a portent of disaster, my son!" Another poem begins with didong (蝃蝀): "There is a girdle in the east; No one dares point at it. A girl has run away, Far from father and mother, far from brothers young and old." Arthur Waley explains translating zhuo (蝃; 'spider') as a loan for di (螮; 'girdle').

The girdle is the rainbow. Its appearance announces that someone who ought not to is about to have a baby; for the arc of the rainbow typifies the swelling girdle of a pregnant woman. No one dares point at it, because pointing is disrespectful, and one must respect a warning sent by Heaven."

"Although many ancient cultures believed rainbows were good omens,"Carr explains, "the Chinese saw them as meteorological disasters. Unlike the auspicious [long] 龍 dragon symbolizing forthcoming rain, the two-headed [hong] 虹 was inauspicious because it appeared after a rain shower." The Huainanzi says both rainbows and comets were warnings from tian "heaven; god". Several classic texts (e.g., Liu Xiang's Shuoyuan and Xinxu) use the phrase baihong guan ri (白虹貫日; 'bright rainbow threads the sun'). For example, it is a portent of assassination in the Zhanguoce "a white halo pierced the sun." One notable exception is the Mengzi using yunni (雲霓; 'cloud and rainbow') to describe the legendary Tang of Shang: "the people looked to him, as we look in a time of great drought to the clouds and rainbows."

The oldest Chinese dictionary, the ca. 3rd century BCE Erya says didong (螮蝀) was called yu (雩; 'rain sacrifice'), defines it as hong (虹; 'rainbow'), and says ni (蜺; 'secondary rainbow') was called qie'er (挈貳; 'lift/carry two'). The commentary of Guo Pu notes rainbows were called yu in Jiangdong (present day Jiangsu and Zhejiang), and gives additional names of meiren (美人; 'beautiful woman') and xiyi (析翳; 'split cover/screen').

The Chuci has more rainbow occurrences (8 of 虹, 10 of 霓, and 5 of 蜺) than any other early text. It graphically interchanges ni (蜺) and ni (霓) except the latter is exclusively used in yunni (雲霓; 'clouds and rainbows') (both with the "cloud radical"). Many rainbows occur in Chuci descriptions of shamanic "flights" through the skies, frequently in contexts with other dragons, for instance: "To hang at my girdle the coiling Green Dragon, To wear at my belt the sinuous [虹] rainbow serpent ... A great [霓] rainbow flag like an awning above me, And pennants dyed in the hues of the sunset." This mythical Green or Azure Dragon ruling the eastern sky and the Vermilion Bird ruling the southern sky reoccur with baini (白霓) "Bright rainbows darting swiftly in the traces".

The Yueling (月令; "Monthly Ordinances") section of the Liji Legge claims hong (虹) rainbows only appear during half the year. In the last month of spring, "Moles are transformed into quails. Rainbows begin to appear." In the first month of winter, "Pheasants enter the great water and become [shen] large mollusks. Rainbows are hidden and do not appear." Along with the rainbow, the shen 蜃 is considered to be a dragon.

Yin and Yang cosmology dichotomized between primary hong (虹; 'Yang/male rainbow') and secondary ni (霓; 'Yin/female rainbow'). Granet analyzed ancient Chinese beliefs about rainbows, which were believed to emanate from interchanges between earthly Yin qi and heavenly Yang qi (see Shiming below). Rainbows thus symbolized a sexual union of Yin-Yang (Shijing 51 above) and a competition between male and female river gods or dragons. Eberhard explains the Chinese symbolism.

The rainbow is seen as a resplendent symbol of the union of yang and yin; it serves therefore as an emblem of a marriage. You should never point your finger at a rainbow. But the rainbow can have another meaning, in that it may appear when either husband or wife is more handsome and attractive than the other, and therefore enters upon an adulterous relationship. The rainbow is then an emblem of fornication or sexual abuse, and forebodes ill.

Like rainbows, dragons were explained in Yin-Yang theory. Rain-dragons supposedly had Yin powers since they controlled water. Edward H. Schafer says.

In China, dragon essence is woman essence. The connection is through the mysterious powers of fertilizing rain, and its extensions in running streams, lakes, and marshes. In common belief as in literature, the dark, wet side of nature showed itself alternately in women and in dragons. The great water deities of Chinese antiquity were therefore snake queens and dragon ladies: they were avatars of dragons precisely because they were equally spirits of the meres and mists and nimbus clouds.

== Etymologies ==
The ca. 200 CE Shiming dictionary (chapter 1, 釋天; Shitian; "Explaining Heaven"), which defines words through phono-semantic glosses, gives the oldest Chinese "etymologies" for rainbows.

- hong 虹 "rainbow" is gong 攻 [same phonetic with the "beat radical" 攴] "attack; assault", [rainbows result from] pure Yang qi attacking Yin qi. 虹攻也,純陽攻陰氣也。
- Also called didong 蝃蝀, which always appears in the east when the sun is in the west, a [rainbow] chuoyin (啜飲) [same phonetic with the "mouth radical" 口] "sucks" the qi from easterly water. It is called sheng 升 "rise; ascend" when seen in the west, [rainbows] appear when the morning sun begins to "rise". 又曰蝃蝀,其見每於日在西而見於東,啜飲東方之水氣也。見於西方曰升,朝日始升而出見也。
- Also called meiren 美人 "beautiful person", named after times when disharmony between Yin and Yang, marital disorder, rampant immorality, men and women considering one another "beautiful", constantly chasing after each other, and such overbearing behaviors are flourishing. 又曰美人，陰陽不和，婚姻錯亂，淫風流行，男美於女，女美於男，恒相奔隨之時，則此氣盛，故以其盛時名之也。

Using "etymology" in the usual Western sense of historical linguistics, Joseph Edkins first proposed Chinese hong (虹; 'rainbow') was "doubtless a variant" of gung (弓; 'bow') and compared it with "Siamese" lung "rainbow".

Carr compares Proto-Sino-Tibetan and Proto-Austro-Tai etymological proposals for hong and didong. Boodberg thought *g'ung < *glung 虹 "rainbow (dragon)" and *lyung-t'lia 龍魑 "dragon" descended from a Proto-Sino-Tibetan *s-brong "wug" root. first thought *lyung 龍 and *g'ung 虹 were early Chinese borrowings from Proto-Austro-Tai *ruŋ "dragon; rainbow"; but later saw *g'ung < *g'[l]uŋ or *k[l]ung 虹 "rainbow" and *tiadtung < *tiad-[skl]ung 蝃蝀 "rainbow" (with a *tung 東 "east" phonetic signifying "red part of the sky") as semantically related with *g'ung < *g[l]ung 紅 "red".

For hong (虹; "rainbow"), Schuessler reconstructs Old Chinese *gôŋ < *gloŋ and compares "very irregular" dialect forms such as Proto-Min ghioŋ^{B} and Gan Shanggao dialect lɑn^{B}-luŋ^{H}. He lists etymological proposals of hong 虹 from Proto-Miao–Yao *kluŋ^{A} or Chinese long (龍; "dragon") and hong (紅; "red").( For jiang 虹 "rainbow", Schuessler reconstructs *krôŋh and notes the survival in Gan Wuning dialect kɔŋ^{C1}. He concludes the "wide range of forms" including didong (蝃蝀) < *tê(t)s-tôŋ < *tê(t)s-tlôŋ suggests a non-Sino-Tibetan "source for this etymon", possibly include Kam–Tai and Zhuang words like tu^{2}-tuŋ^{2} or Proto-Tai *Druŋ (cf. Thai ruŋ^{C2} "rainbow".)

== Mythological parallels ==
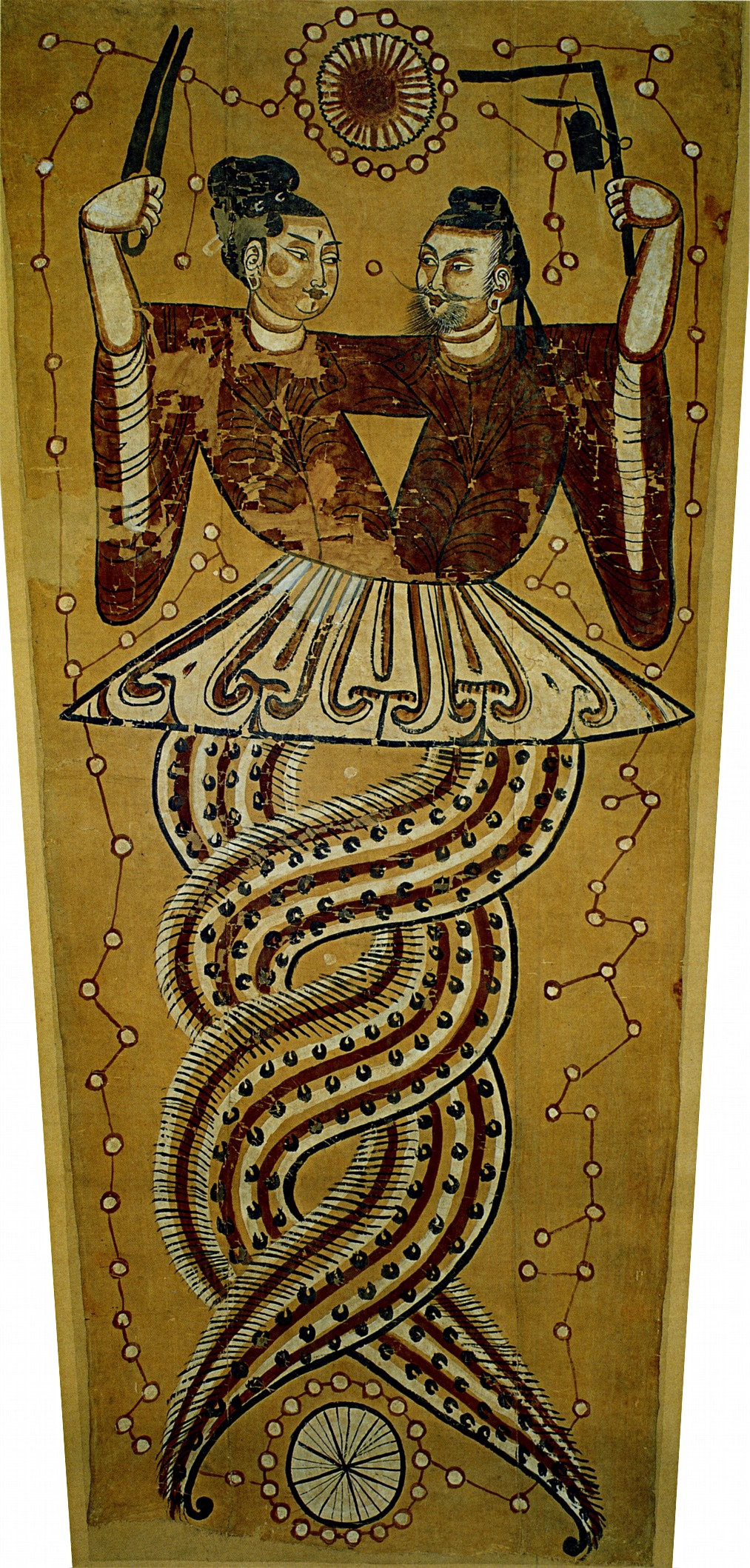
Tomb painting of Nüwa and Fuxi excavated in Xinjiang.

"hong < *g'ung 虹 'rainbow' has always represented a dragon to the Chinese," says Carr, "from Shang oracle pictographs of dicephalous sky-serpents to the modern 虹 graph with the 'wug' radical." The mythic Chinese hong "rainbow" dragon has a few parallels in the natural world (two-headed snake, Rainbow Snake Farancia erytrogramma, and Rainbow Boa Epicrates cenchria) and many in comparative mythology (see rainbows in mythology and snakes in mythology).

Loewenstein compares rainbow-serpent legends throughout Southeast Asia, the Pacific, Australia, Africa, and South America; and concludes:

Myths of a giant rainbow-serpent are common among primitive tribes inhabiting the tropics. Outside the tropical belt the rainbow-serpent concept is hardly to be found. This points to the fact that the myth must be intimately connected with the occurrence and geographic distribution of a particular family of snakes, the Boidae, which includes the largest specimens in existence, namely the Pythons and the Boas.

The well-known Rainbow Serpent is central to creation myths of the Indigenous Australians (translated as Chinese hongshe and Japanese nijihebi 虹蛇 "rainbow snake"). Some other examples include:

- Ayida Wedo is a rainbow serpent loa of rainbows and fertility in Haitian Vodou
- Nehebkau is a two-headed snake in Egyptian mythology
- Sisiutl is a three-headed sea serpent, with one anthropomorphic and two reptilian heads, in Kwakwaka'wakw mythology
- Oshunmare is a male and female rainbow serpent in Yoruba mythology

Lastly, another Chinese rainbow myth involves the creator Nüwa 女媧 repairing a crack in the sky caused by the water deity Gong Gong 共工 (cf. 虹). She supposedly created the first rainbow by melting stones of 5 or 7 different colors to patch the sky. Nüwa and her brother-consort Fuxi are represented as having the upper body of a human and the tail of a dragon or serpent. They are associated with yin and yang, like secondary and primary rainbows.

== See also ==
- Chinese mythology in popular culture
