= Nuxalk religion =

Religious beliefs traditionally held by the Nuxalk people

Nuxalk religion is the set of beliefs traditionally held by the Nuxalk people, a First Nation of the Pacific Northwest Coast. It shares common elements with those of neighboring peoples.

== Figures and concepts ==
- Alhkwʼntam, the creator god (Alkuntam in older sources)
- Masmasalanixw, the Four Supernatural Carpenters who carved the first human beings
- Snx, the sun god (Senx in older sources)
- Qamaits, the war goddess
- Qʼumakwa, the sea god (similar to Kumugwe)
- Talyu, Qʼumakwa's wife
- S7ayulh, the thunderbird
- Sisyulh, a two-headed sea serpent
- Tcncniyaaq, the cosmic tree (Milky Way)
- Qwaxw (Raven), the trickster
- The four catastrophes: the falling of the sky, the burning of the world, the flood and the famine

== See also ==
- Mythologies of the Indigenous peoples of the Americas

== Bibliography ==
- Nater, Hank (2022-01-16). "The Nuxalk Language : (lexicon, narratives, grammar)". ScienceOpen Preprints. doi:10.14293/S2199-1006.1.SOR-.PPC20XL.v1.
- "Nuxalk". American Museum of Natural History.
- "Culture & Language". Nuxalk Nation.
- "The Jesup Expedition to the North Pacific Coast". Science. 6 (145): 535–538. 1897. doi:10.1126/science.6.145.535. JSTOR 1622723.
- Gray, Louis Herbert (1916). The Mythology of All Races. Vol. X. Marshall Jones Company. ISBN 102517643X. OL 7090821M.
- Savill, Sheila (1978). Pears Encyclopaedia of Myths and Legends: Oceania and Australia, the Americas. Pelham. ISBN 0720710502. OL 10534491M.
- Campbell, Joseph (1988). Historical Atlas of World Mythology. Vol. II. Perennial Library. ISBN 0060963514. OL 17995134M.
- Dixon-Kennedy, Mike (1998). Native American Myth & Legend: An A-Z of People and Places. Brockhampton Press. ISBN 1860198392. OL 3746942M.
