= Four carpenters =

The four carpenters may refer to:

- The four horns and four craftsmen, of Jewish mythology
- The four carpenters, of Nuxalk mythology
