= Kwakwakaʼwakw music =

Music genre

The Kwakwakaʼwakw peoples have practiced sacred and secular music for thousands of years. The Kwakwakaʼwakw are a collective of twenty-five nations of the Wakashan language family who altogether form part of a larger identity comprising the Indigenous Peoples of the Pacific Northwest Coast, located in what is known today as British Columbia, Canada.

The Kwakwakaʼwakw peoples use instruments in conjunction with dance and song for the purposes of ceremony, ritual, and storytelling (see also Kwakwakaʼwakw mythology). Certain Kwakwakaʼwakw traditions include ghosts who are able to bring back the dead with their song. Love songs are also an important part of Kwakwakaʼwakw music.

A mixture of percussive instrumentation, especially log and stick, and box or hide drums, as well as rattles, whistles, and the clapper (musical instrument) create a beat while vocal expression establishes the rhythm. Instrument makers specifically design new musical instruments for each respective dance.

The Kwakʼwala word for "summer song" is baquyala, and the word for "winter song" is tsʼēʼkꞏala. The arrival of the next winter season is celebrated each year in a four-day festival of song and dance called tsetseqa, or Winter Ceremonial. Tsetseqa begins with singing the songs of those who died since the last winter season. The entire tsetseqa season is devoted to ceremony, including initiation of the young into various dancing societies.

Another very important festival involving song and dance is the potlatch (Chinook: "to give"), a Kwakwakaʼwakw tradition of sharing wealth and prestige in order to establish status and ensure witnesses remember the respective stories celebrated. Potlatches often occur during tsetseqa to announce a new initiate into one of the secret dancing societies.

== Kwakwaka'wakw dancing societies ==
There are four main groups of Kwakwaka'wakw dancing societies since ancient times: Hamatsa ("Cannibal"), Winalagilis ("Making War All Over the Earth"), Atlakim ("Taken Far Away Into the Woods"), and Dluwalakha or Klasila. There is a house for each dancing society, and only members may enter. The ceremony is intended to recreate the original encounter with the ancient spirit. Each society delegates a song master to invent and memorize songs for all members of the respective society. Unlike other social positions, the song master is not an inherited position, but is chosen for his talent in creating and remembering songs. The song master is even paid for his services, creating and memorizing from one to four songs for every novice initiate. Children of song masters are placed inside a drum, and the father sings and beats the drum in sequences of four to try and pass down his talent.

=== Hamatsa (hāʼmatsʼa) ===
Hamatsa ("cannibal") is the most important secret society, replacing the earlier feminine dance hamshamtses of ancient times. Hamatsas receive their food and gifts before any other potlatch attendee. Only the sons of chiefs are eligible to become a hamatsa. The Man Eater Spirit, Baxbakualanuxsiwae, makes a whistling sound causing the spirit to possess the novice. The novice disappears into the woods, and returns crying and biting members of the audience. The musicians change tempo to match the possessed spirit. Eventually the dancers calm the spirit. The ritual concludes when the new initiate sings his newly-acquired hamatsa song. The novice performs a trick on the final day after a potlatch is held in his honour.

The Kwakwakaʼwakw of Fort Rupert, the largest of the Kwakwakaʼwakw villages at the time of European contact, raided a Heiltsuk canoe in 1835 and stole Hamatsa whistles. The nation subsequently adopted hamatsa dance traditions.

Contemporary historians argue that hamatsa initiates were not real cannibals, rather they used fake or real flesh as props of which they did not actually consume.

=== Winalagilis ===
Winalagilis ("Making War All Over the Earth") dances tell the stories of violent and possessed warriors. Ghost dancers revive the dead warrior spirits and afterward sing a song together. Song leaders of ghost dancers memorize two songs only.

=== Atlakim ===
The song for the Atlakim ("Taken Far Away Into the Woods") dance introduces the dancers. Singers repeat the song for each new dancer they introduce.

=== Dluwalakha ===
The Kwakwakaʼwakw peoples restrict Dluwalakha ceremonies to the spring season. They hold a potlatch on the last day of the ceremony to repay the mask makers and everyone else who was affected by the novice dancer. Dancers sometimes use a Dluwalakha dance to announce their intentions of one day becoming a hamatsa. Cedar whistles introduce the supernatural motivation for the Dluwalakha dance. Masks accompany the song and dance, which collectively tell the story of the novice being overtaken by a supernatural power of the family dloogwi.

== Kwakwakaʼwakw ensemble ==
Kwakwakaʼwakw ensemble includes a variety of different musical instruments depending on the purpose of the dance being performed, with vocals being the only melodic instrument in the soundscape of their ensemble.

The rattle is the most important instrument in the ceremony of the Kwakwakaʼwakw rituals. In his book Crooked Beak of Heaven, Bill Holm describes the sound of the rattle as being a "direct contact with the supernatural."

The box drum is another instrument central to Kwakwakaʼwakw music. It is usually made from cedar, which has a spiritual significance for the Kwakwakaʼwakw peoples (see Kwakwakaʼwakw mythology). A large number of people collectively beat the drum and sing the song that they are drumming to.

=== Whistle ===
The Kwakwakaʼwakw peoples use a variety of whistles each containing its own unique pitch. Sometimes they combine several chambers together so the player is able to produce up to three combined pitches without switching instruments. Whistles announce the presence of supernatural spirits. Whistles also represent voices of the spirits in the stories being told.

=== Drum (mEnāʼtsē) ===
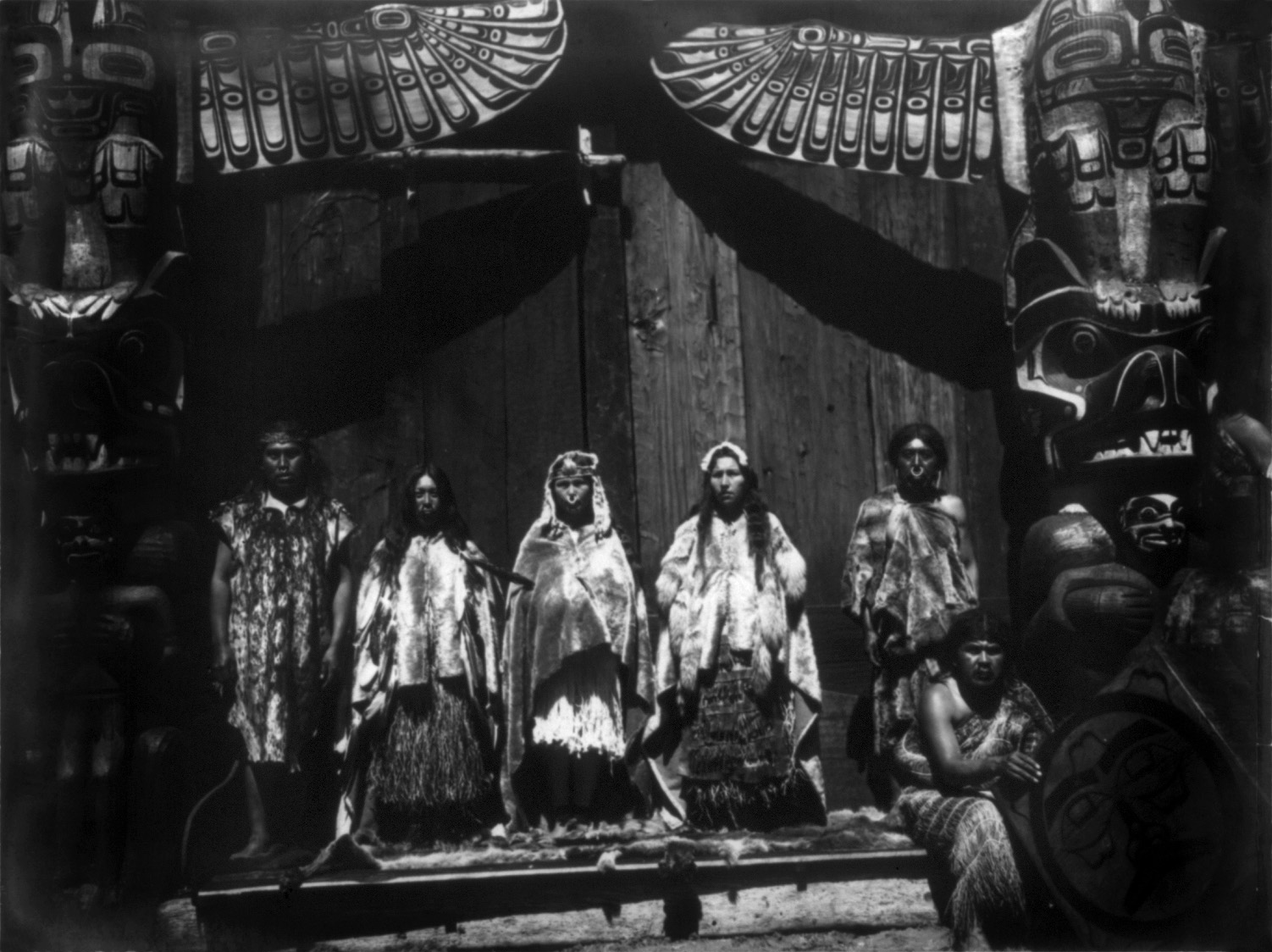
A Kwakwakaʼwakw bride poses for a photograph with her father, the father of the groom, dancers and musician. A man sitting on the far right carries a traditional box drum.

A singer's baton, or rhythm instrument, is the main form of percussion in Kwakwakaʼwakw music. The baton is typically one foot in length and made of a variety of wood depending on whether for temporary or long-term use. Simple firewood comprises the temporary batons, which every guest receives so they can drum along with, and be part of, the beat. Song leaders, or baton masters, use elaborately carved sticks they use more than once made from hardwood or cedar. The carving is typically a sea lion because they have a similar shape comparable to the singer's baton, however the significance of the design is unclear. The box drum is also a form of percussion used for thousands of years by the Kwakwakaʼwakw Peoples.

=== Rattle (iaʼtEn) ===
Wooden rattles are used in Kwakwakaʼwakw music for ceremonial purposes to establish contact with the supernatural world. The rattle is an ancient icon intended to keep the dancer calm and free of spiritual possession. Rattles also reportedly bring back the dead.

=== Clapper ===
Kwakwakaʼwakw music clappers are a combination of the rattle and singing baton, and are traditionally made of leather and wood. The clapper is a one-handed instrument that produces sharp and sudden sounds when the two pieces of wood clap together.
