= Rainbows in mythology =

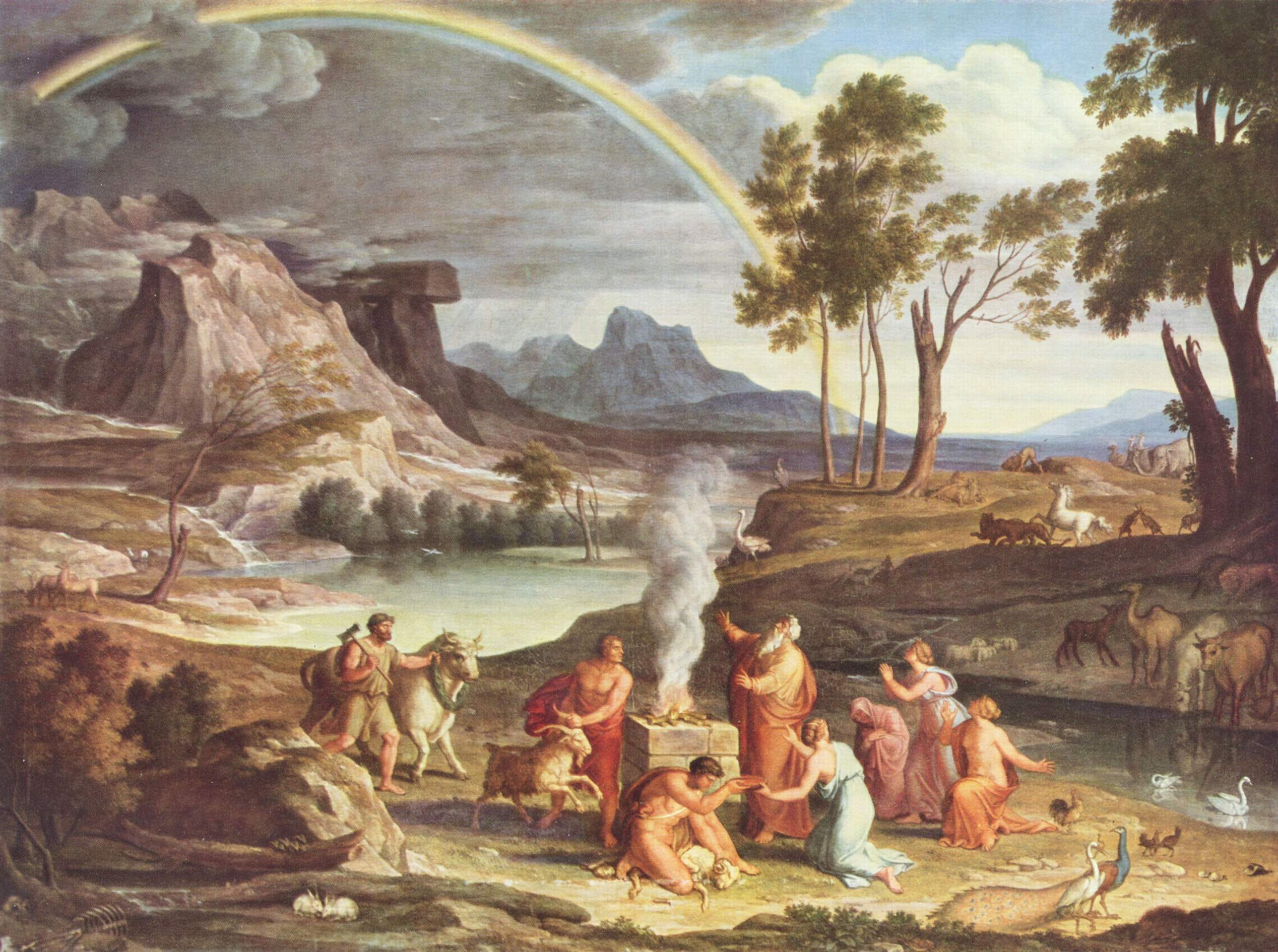
Noah's Thanksoffering (c.1803) by Joseph Anton Koch. Noah builds an altar to the Lord after being delivered from the Flood; God sends the rainbow as a sign of his covenant (Genesis 8–9).

The rainbow has been a favorite component of mythology throughout history among many cultures around the world. Abrahamic traditions see it as a covenant with God to preserve the world from a second flood. Whether as a bridge to the heavens, messenger, archer's bow, or serpent, the rainbow has served as a symbol for millennia. There are myriad beliefs in a complex diversity with several repeated themes.

== Rainbow deities ==
- In Mesopotamian and Elamite mythology, the goddess Manzat was a personification of the rainbow.
- In Greek mythology, the goddess Iris personifies the rainbow. In many stories, such as the Iliad, she carries messages from the gods to the human world, thus forming a link between heaven and earth. Iris's messages often concerned war and retribution. In some myths, the rainbow merely represents the path made by Iris as she flies.
- Many Aboriginal Australian mythologies include a Rainbow Serpent deity, the name and characteristics of which vary according to cultural traditions. It is often seen as a creator god, and also as a force of destruction. It is generally considered to control the rain, and conceals itself in waterholes during the dry season. Rock paintings of the Being are scattered across the continent, mostly found in western Arnhem Land.
- In Chinese mythology, Hong is a two-headed dragon that represents the rainbow.
- In Mesoamerican cultures, Ix Chel is a maternal jaguar goddess associated with rain. Chel means rainbow in the Yucatán Poqomchi' language. Ix Chel wears a serpent headdress and presides principally over birth and healing.
- Anuenue, the rainbow maiden, appears in Hawaiian legends as the messenger for her brothers, the gods Tane and Kanaloa.
- Several West African religions incorporate personified rainbow spirits. Examples include Oxumare in the Yoruban religion Ifá; Ayida Wedo in Haitian Vodou, as practiced in Benin; and the pythons Dagbe Dre and Dagbe Kpohoun in West African Vodun, as practiced by the Ewe people of Benin.
- In Māori mythology there are several personifications for the rainbow, depending on its form, who usually appear representing omens and are appealed to during times of war. The most widespread of these are Uenuku and Kahukura.
- For the Karen people of Burma, the rainbow is considered as a painted and dangerous demon that eats children.
- In Muisca religion, Cuchavira or Cuhuzabiba, who was called "shining air" is the rainbow deity, which in the Andes rain and sun were both very important for their agriculture.
- Amitolane is a rainbow spirit from the mythology of the Zuni, a Native American tribe.
- In Albanian folk beliefs the rainbow is regarded as the belt of the goddess Prende, and oral legend has it that anyone who jumps over the rainbow changes their sex.
- In pre-Hispanic Andean cosmology, the rainbow was related with both the sacred serpent or amaru and the thunder god Illapa.

== Rainbow bridges ==
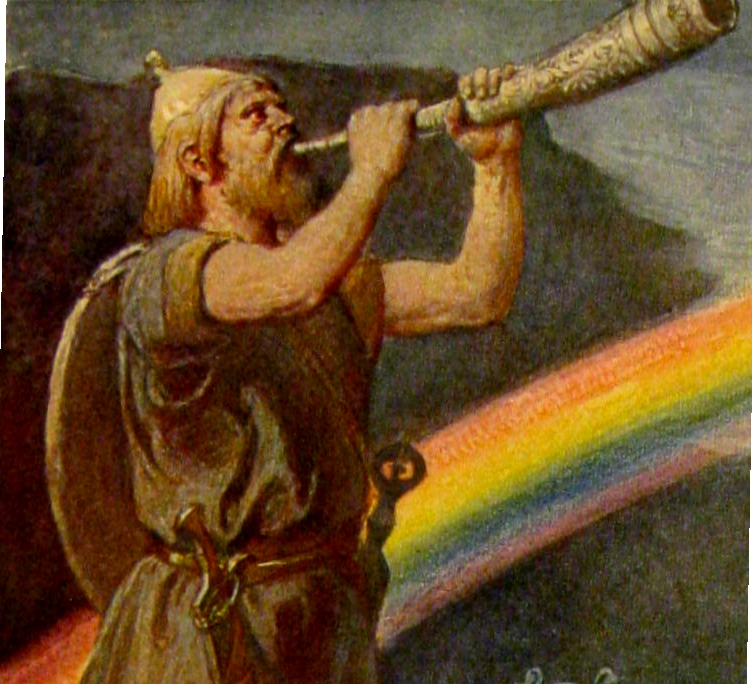
Heimdall before the Rainbow Bridge

- In Norse religion, a burning rainbow bridge called the Bifrost connects Midgard (earth) with Asgard, home of the gods. Bifrost can be used only by gods and those who are killed in battle. It is eventually shattered under the weight of war – the Ragnarok (German: Götterdämmerung). The notion that the rainbow bridge to heaven is attainable by only the good or virtuous, such as warriors and royalty, is a theme repeated often in world myths.
- In Japanese mythology, the Floating Bridge of Heaven may have been inspired by the rainbow. The creator deities Izanami and Izanagi stood upon this bridge as they brought the Japanese archipelago into existence.
- In Navajo tradition, the rainbow is the path of the holy spirits, and is frequently depicted in sacred sandpaintings.
- Māori mythology tells a tale of Hina, the moon, who caused a rainbow to span the heavens even down to the earth, for her mortal husband to return to earth to end his days, since death may not enter her celestial home.
- Shamans among Siberia's Buryats speak of ascending to the sky-spirit world by way of the rainbow.
- In Philippine mythology, there are various legends about the rainbow and its origins. The Bagobo credit Pamulak Manobo as the creator of the rainbow; in Tagalog folklore, "bahaghari", the local word for rainbow comes from the name of Bighari, Bathala's tardy daughter who created the rainbow out of colorful flowers to ask him to forgive her for missing important family meetings; the Tausug have the Biraddali, seven angelic sisters who use the rainbow as a bridge to earth, but cannot fly if someone steals their detachable wings. In a variant of the Biraddali and swan maiden myths, the rainbow is said to symbolize a family's love for each other. The story starts with a farmer's plans to sow getting delayed by unidentified parties tearing down his stone wall. The farmer spends the first and second days rebuilding his wall before returning home at sunset. The third time this happens, the farmer decides to hide and identify the vandal(s). That night, three identical sister star maidens fly down from the heavens. Taking off their wings, the sisters proceed to play on the farmer's wall, knocking it down. While the star maidens are having fun, the farmer secretly swipes the youngest one's wings, hiding them beneath his hut. After playing, the star maidens decide to go home before the sun melts their wings; only two of them fly back to the heavens as the youngest cannot find her own wings. The farmer returns to his field and brings the lone star maiden home. The two fall in love, marry, have a son, and live a contented life on the farm. But while the farmer is out working one day, his wife rediscovers her wings. Feeling that her husband had tricked her into staying on Earth, the star maiden dons her wings and flies back to the heavens, bringing their son with her. A sky deity takes pity on the farmer, sending down a rope for him to climb up and visit his family. Upon arriving in the heavens, the farmer discovers his wife is the youngest of identical octuplet sisters, but he is able to identify her due to the calluses she had sustained from doing chores. The farmer climbs up the rope every day to visit his family. One day, he gets trapped in a storm, hanging on to the rope for dear life; his wife tries to rescue him but she ends up hanging on too. To save their sister and brother-in-law, the other star maidens sacrifice their wings, combining them with sunlight and moonlight to create the first rainbow. Having forgiven her husband, the youngest star maiden returns to earth with him and their son, leaving her wings in the heavens for her sisters to remember her by. The legend ends by saying that whenever a rainbow appears, the farmer and his wife's family would climb it to visit each other.
- Modern myths from the UK and the US allude to a rainbow bridge of pets believed to reach up into Heaven where the souls of pets will be joyously reunited with their owners after they cross the rainbow bridge.

== Rainbows and archery ==
- The rainbow is depicted as an archer's bow in Hindu mythology. Indra, the god of thunder and war, uses the rainbow to shoot arrows of lightning.
- In pre-Islamic Arabian mythology, the rainbow is the bow of a weather god, Quzaḥ, whose name survives in the Arabic word for rainbow, قوس قزح qaws Quzaḥ, "the bow of Quzaḥ".
- The Sumerian farmer god Ninurta defended Sumer with a bow and arrow, and wore a crown described as a rainbow.

=== Rainbows as bow to be thrown ===
In Ghana, the mythology of the Akan people/Ashanti (Asante people conceives of the rainbow as the "Sky God's bow" (or perhaps rather "sky-god's arch"). The word for "rainbow" in the local Akan/Twi-Fante language is nyankontɔn, literally "Nyanke-Nyankopon's bow", i.e., "Sky God's bow", and likewise in the Ashanti language. However, in an actual Akan folktale example, the Sky God does not fire arrows with the bow, but casts the bow itself into a rainbow; he also wills or wishes the bow to throw itself around the sun to form a circular rainbow around the sun (i.e., halo, called kontonkurowie by the natives), thus protecting the son from the moon, both being the Sky God's children.

== Rainbow taboos ==
- The Sumu of Honduras and Nicaragua refer to the rainbow as walasa aniwe, "the devil is vexed". These people hide their children in their huts to keep them from looking or pointing at the rainbow. Similar taboos against pointing at rainbows can be found throughout the world, in over a hundred cultural traditions.
- In Amazonian cultures, rainbows have long been associated with malign spirits that cause harm, such as miscarriages and (especially) skin problems. In the Amuesha language of central Peru, certain diseases are called ayona'achartan, meaning "the rainbow hurt my skin". A tradition of closing one's mouth at the sight of a rainbow in order to avoid disease appears to pre-date the Incan empire.
- In the mythology of ancient Slavs, a man touched by the rainbow is drawn to heaven, and becomes a "Płanetnik" – half-demonic creature – which is under the power of the thunder and lightning god Perun.
- In Latvian legends it was believed that the rainbow drank from river or lake like a living creature and thus released rain from its body. It was forbidden to approach the water source if there was a rainbow, or they would risk being accidentally swallowed by the rainbow, and later fall down during rainfall as nothing but bones.

== Other legends ==
- In the Hebrew Book of Genesis, after the flood had almost wiped out the entire human race, Yahweh told Noah that he will set the rainbow as a token of his promise that he would never send another flood large enough to destroy all life. It is said that no rainbows appeared during the lifetime of 2nd-century rabbi Simeon bar Yochai, as his own righteousness was sufficient to guarantee God's mercy.
- In Ireland, a common legend asserts that a pot of gold is to be found at the end of a rainbow, guarded by a leprechaun.
- In a Chinese folktale, Hsienpo and Yingt'ai are star-crossed lovers who must wait until the rainbow appears to be alone together. Hsienpo is the red in the rainbow, and Yingt'ai is the blue.
- The Fang of Gabon are initiated into the religion by a "transcendent experience when they arrive at the rainbow's center, for there they can see both the entire circle of the rainbow and of the earth, signaling the success of their vision". The Fang also prohibit their children from looking at the rainbow.
- For Buddhists, the rainbow is "the highest state achievable before attaining Nirvana, where individual desire and consciousness are extinguished." Accordingly, there is mention of a rainbow body.
- According to syncretic Malay shamanism and folklore, the rainbow is said to have been formed from the sword of the earth serpent Sakatimuna who was defeated by the archangel Gabriel.
- Rainbows are widely seen in Native American stories and prophecies. The Cherokee believe the rainbow forms the hem of the Sun's coat.
- In Chinese mythology, the rainbow is described as the patch from melted colored stones to fix a crack in the sky by goddess Nüwa.
