= Qʼumakwa =

Sea god in Nuxalk religion

Qʼumakwa is the sea god in Nuxalk religion.

He and his wife, Talyu, are said to live in a house made of copper at the mouth of an undersea river. Nuxalk people prize salmon and berries as gifts from him.

== See also ==
- Kumugwe, the Kwakwakaʼwakw sea god
