= List of music areas in the United States =

This is a list of music areas in the United States. To some degree, every state can be said to constitute a music area, as well as many large metropolitan areas, rural regions and even individual neighborhoods or boroughs within a city.

Music area	Characteristics
Akron; Akron, Ohio	
Alabama; Alabama	Part of the U.S. South; Muscle Shoals recording studio in Muscle Shoals, Alabama is the center of a notable Southern soul scene
Alaska; Alaska	Indigenous peoples: Inuit, Kwakiutl and Aleut music
Amarillo; Amarillo, Texas	
American Samoa; American Samoa	Traditional Polynesian music communicates history and culture through song and dance.; Special events are commemorated by musical competitions called fiafia.
Ann Arbor; Ann Arbor, Michigan	
Annapolis; Annapolis, Maryland	
Appalachia; Appalachia: West Virginia, Virginia, Maryland, Tennessee, Kentucky, North Carolina, South Carolina, Georgia (Pennsylvania, New York, Ohio, Vermont, New Hampshire and Maine can also be considered Appalachian, but musical texts generally use "Appalachian" to mean the Southern range)	Old-time music
Arizona; Arizona	Hardcore punk has been a notable part of a number of Arizona local scenes, especially including Phoenix, Arizona.; The Tohono O'Odham of Southern Arizona have created a form of music called chicken scratch.
Athens, Georgia; Athens, Georgia	
Atlanta; Atlanta, Georgia	
Austin; Austin, Texas	Alternative rock; Western swing; Country music
Baltimore; Baltimore, Maryland	
Baton Rouge; Baton Rouge, Louisiana	
Berkeley; Berkeley, California	
Boston; Boston, Massachusetts	
Buffalo; Buffalo, New York	
Cajun; Southern Louisiana	
California; California	Spanish missions in California were important musical institutions throughout much of what is now California during the colonial era, leaving a lasting cultural impact.; West Coast blues; Bakersfield sound in Bakersfield, California; Glam metal in Los Angeles; Thrash metal in San Francisco; Psychedelic rock in San Francisco; Hardcore punk in San Francisco; Cool jazz; West Coast rap; Gangsta rap, especially G-funk; Hardcore punk in Southern California; Paisley Underground; Skacore; Deathrock; Surf music; Cowpunk
Chapel Hill; Chapel Hill, North Carolina	
Charlotte; Charlotte, North Carolina	
Chicago; Chicago, Illinois	
Cleveland; Cleveland, Ohio	
Colorado; Colorado	
Colorado Springs; Colorado Springs, Colorado	
Columbia; Columbia, South Carolina	
Connecticut; Connecticut	
Dallas; Dallas, Texas	
Dayton; Dayton, Ohio	
Delaware; Delaware	
Denver; Denver, Colorado	
Des Moines; Des Moines, Iowa	
Detroit; Detroit, Michigan	
El Paso; El Paso, Texas	
Fargo; Fargo, North Dakota	
Florida; Florida	
Fort Lauderdale; Fort Lauderdale, Florida	
Fort Worth; Fort Worth, Texas	
Fresno; Fresno, California	
Georgia; Georgia	
Hawaii; Hawaii	
Honolulu; Honolulu, Hawaii	
Houston; Houston, Texas	
Idaho; Idaho	Cowboy music
Illinois; Illinois	
Indiana; Indiana	
Indianapolis; Indianapolis, Indiana	
Iowa; Iowa	
Juneau; Juneau, Alaska	
Kansas; Kansas	
Kansas City; Kansas City, Missouri	
Kentucky; Kentucky	
Knoxville; Knoxville, Tennessee	
Las Vegas; Las Vegas, Nevada	Las Vegas is home to many tourist attractions and popular stage shows that cater to the city's many visitors, with glitzy performances in a variety of styles. Lounge music is especially associated with some of these performances in Las Vegas.
Little Rock; Little Rock, Arkansas	
Long Beach; Long Beach, California	
Los Angeles; Los Angeles, California	
Louisiana; Louisiana	
Louisville; Louisville, Kentucky	
Lubbock; Lubbock, Texas	Lubbock Sound of country music
Maine; Maine	
Maryland; Maryland	
Massachusetts; Massachusetts	
Michigan; Michigan	
Mid-Atlantic; Mid-Atlantic States: New York, New Jersey, Pennsylvania, Delaware, Maryland, West Virginia, Virginia, Washington D.C.	
Minnesota; Minnesota	
Mississippi; Mississippi	
Missouri; Missouri	
Montana; Montana	Cowboy music
Nebraska; Nebraska	
Nevada; Nevada	Nevada's largest city is Las Vegas, home to popular stage shows, lounge singers and others who cater to visiting tourists.
New England; New England: Maine, Vermont, New Hampshire, Rhode Island, Massachusetts, Connecticut	
New Hampshire; New Hampshire	
New Jersey; New Jersey	
New Mexico; New Mexico	
New York; New York	
North Carolina; North Carolina	
North Dakota; North Dakota	
Ohio; Ohio	
' Oklahoma	Cowboy music; Western swing in Tulsa
Olympia; Olympia, Washington	Riot Grrl; Indie rock; Twee pop
Oregon; Oregon	Portland, Oregon is home to a regionally important indie rock scene.
Pennsylvania; Pennsylvania	
Music of Phoenix; Phoenix, Arizona	Phoenix has been home to a vibrant hardcore punk scene.
Portland; Portland, Oregon	Indie rock
Rhode Island; Rhode Island	
Salt Lake City; Salt Lake City, Utah	Salt Lake City is home to a thriving Mormon pop industry.
Seattle; Seattle	Grunge; Garage rock
U.S. South; U.S. South: Georgia, Mississippi, Tennessee, Florida, North Carolina, South Carolina, Virginia, Louisiana, Texas, Arkansas, Oklahoma, Missouri, West Virginia, Maryland, Washington D.C.	
South Carolina; South Carolina	
South Dakota; South Dakota	
Tejano; South Texas	Corrido, conjunto and other styles of Mexican-derived music
Tennessee; Tennessee	
Texas; Texas	Western swing in Austin; Tejano music of Southern Texas; Alternative rock in Austin; Cowboy music
Utah; Utah	The international headquarters for The Church of Jesus Christ of Latter-day Saints (LDS Church) is in Salt Lake City, so Utah is a center for LDS music, including Mormon pop, Mormon folk music, and both the religious and secular music performed by the Tabernacle Choir at Temple Square.
Vermont; Vermont	
Virginia; Virginia	
Washington; Washington	Olympia and Seattle are two most important centers for popular music; both are home to important alternative and indie rock scenes.
Washington, D.C. Washington, D.C.	
West; U.S. West	
West Virginia; West Virginia	
Wisconsin; Wisconsin	
Wyoming; Wyoming	Cowboy music
