= Qamaits =

War goddess in Nuxalk religion

Qamaits is the war goddess in Nuxalk religion, titled Our Woman and Afraid-of-Nothing.

She is said to have fought the mountains at the beginning of time, reducing their size and rendering the earth inhabitable. Her house is at the eastern end of the upper heaven; behind it, there is a saltwater pool where she bathes and where the sisyulh (a two-headed sea serpent) lives. The goddess is not addressed in prayer, and her rare visits to earth cause sickness and death.

== Bibliography ==
- "The Jesup Expedition to the North Pacific Coast". Science. 6 (145): 535–538. 1897. doi:10.1126/science.6.145.535. JSTOR 1622723.
- Gray, Louis Herbert (1916). The Mythology of All Races. Vol. X. Marshall Jones Company. ISBN 102517643X. OL 7090821M.
- Savill, Sheila (1978). Pears Encyclopaedia of Myths and Legends: Oceania and Australia, the Americas. Pelham. ISBN 0720710502. OL 10534491M.
- Campbell, Joseph (1988). Historical Atlas of World Mythology. Vol. II. Perennial Library. ISBN 0060963514. OL 17995134M.
- Dixon-Kennedy, Mike (1998). Native American Myth & Legend: An A-Z of People and Places. Brockhampton Press. ISBN 1860198392. OL 3746942M.
