= Cultural area =

Geographical area associated with a specific cultural orientation

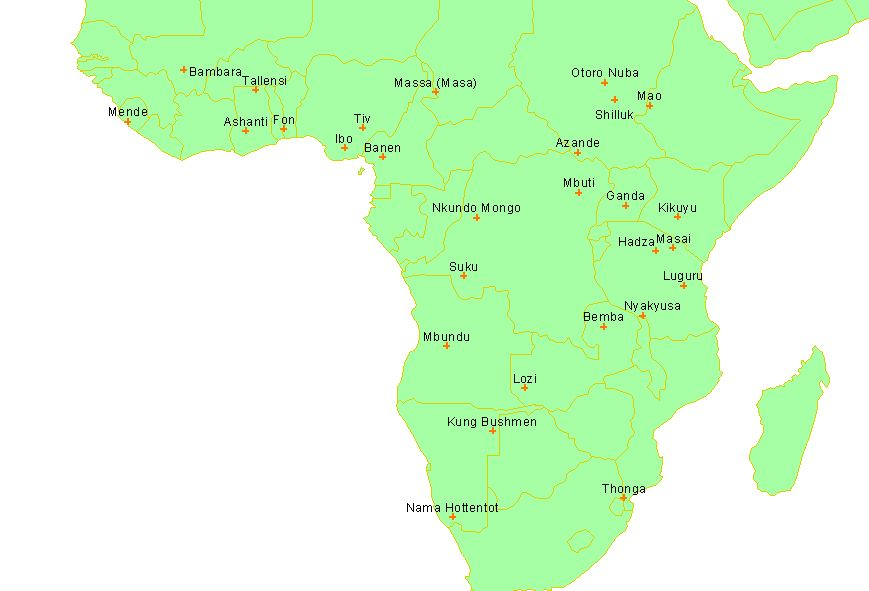
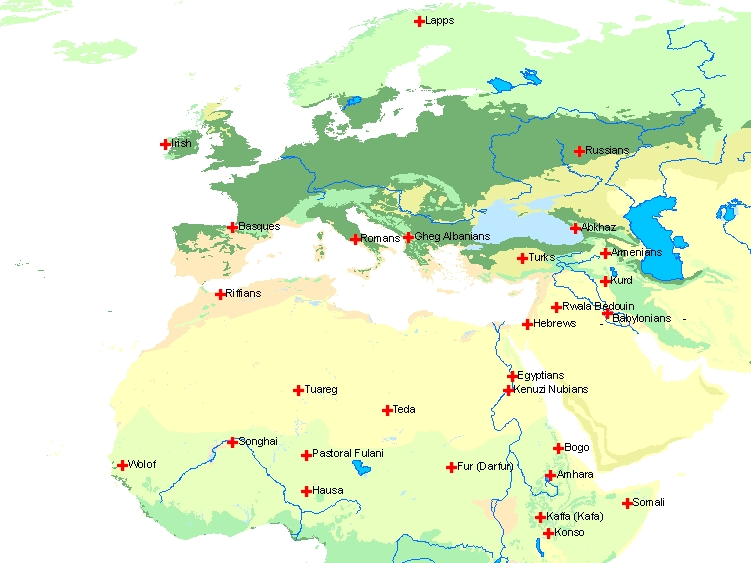
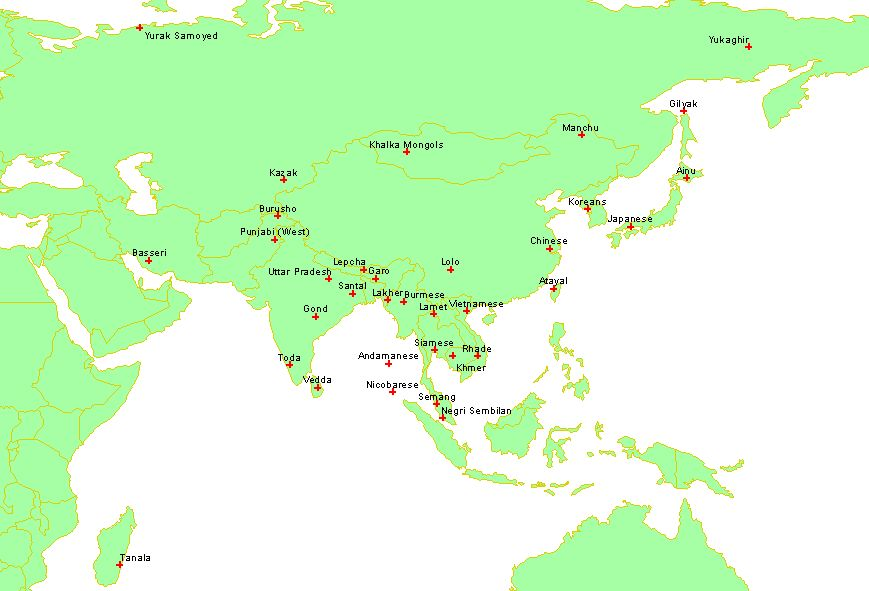
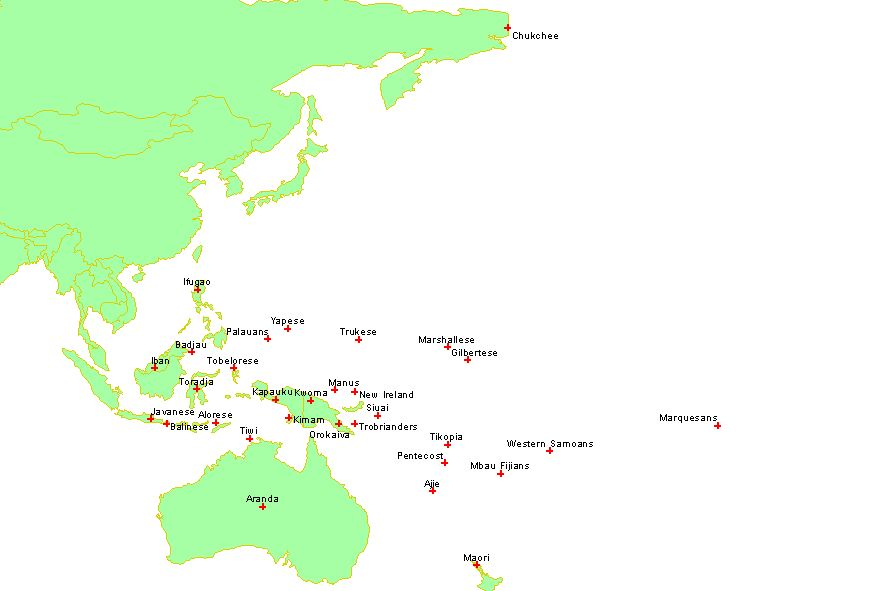
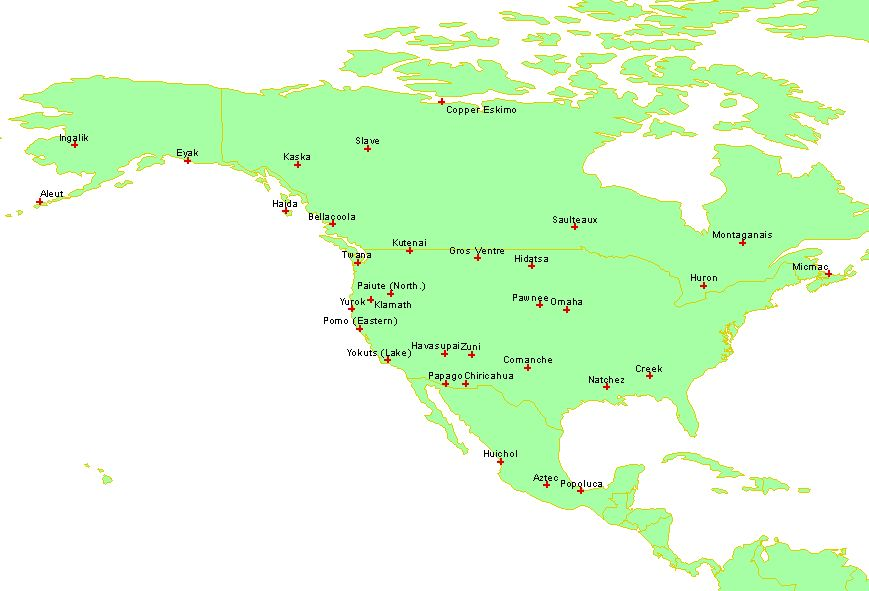
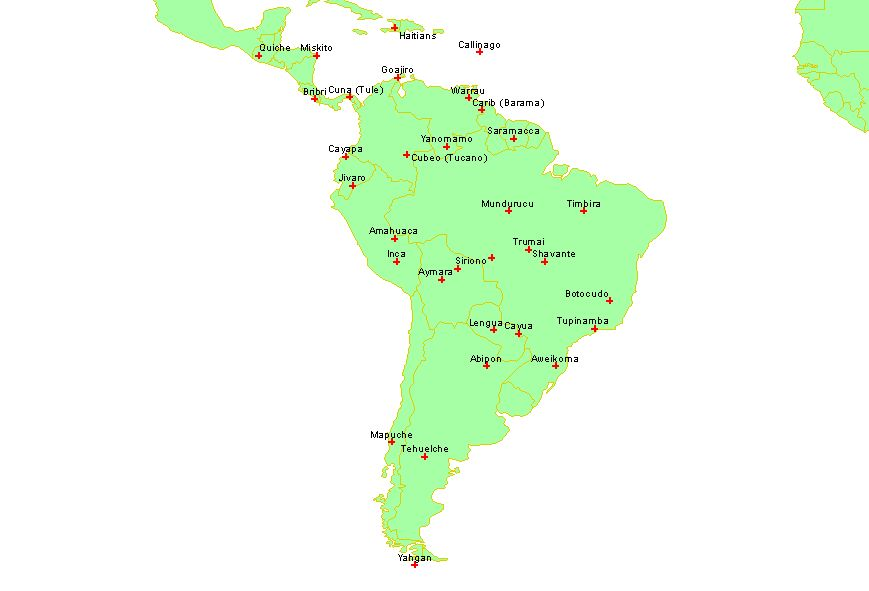
From top, clockwise: Africa, Circum-Mediterranean, East Eurasia, South America, North America and Insular-Pacific cultural areas in the Standard cross-cultural sample

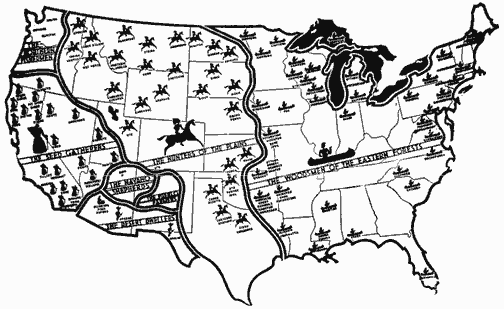
Clark Wissler's map of Native American cultural areas within the territory of the United States (1948)

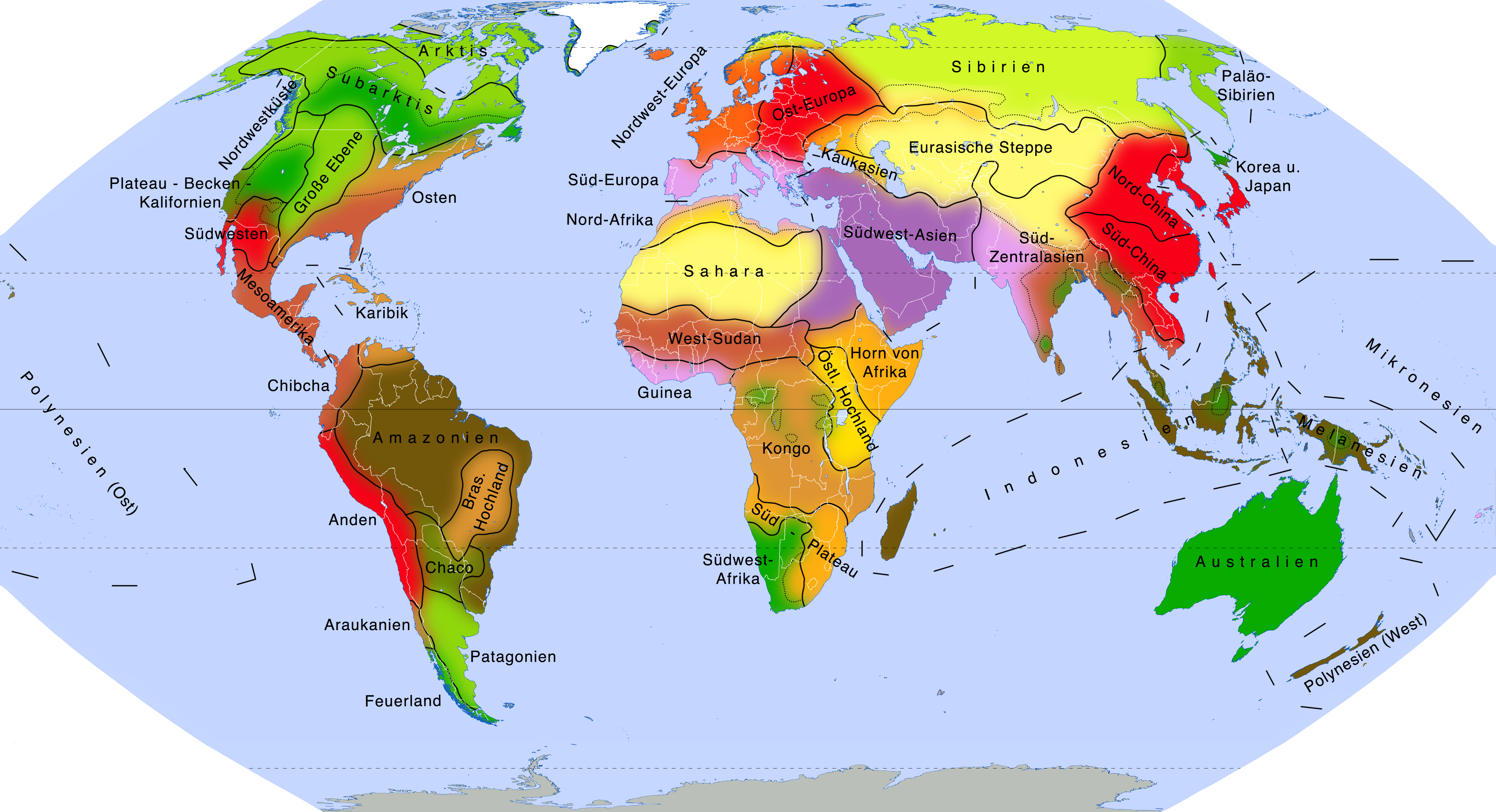
Cultural areas of the world as defined by Whitten and Hunter (1976) and by Haller (2010)

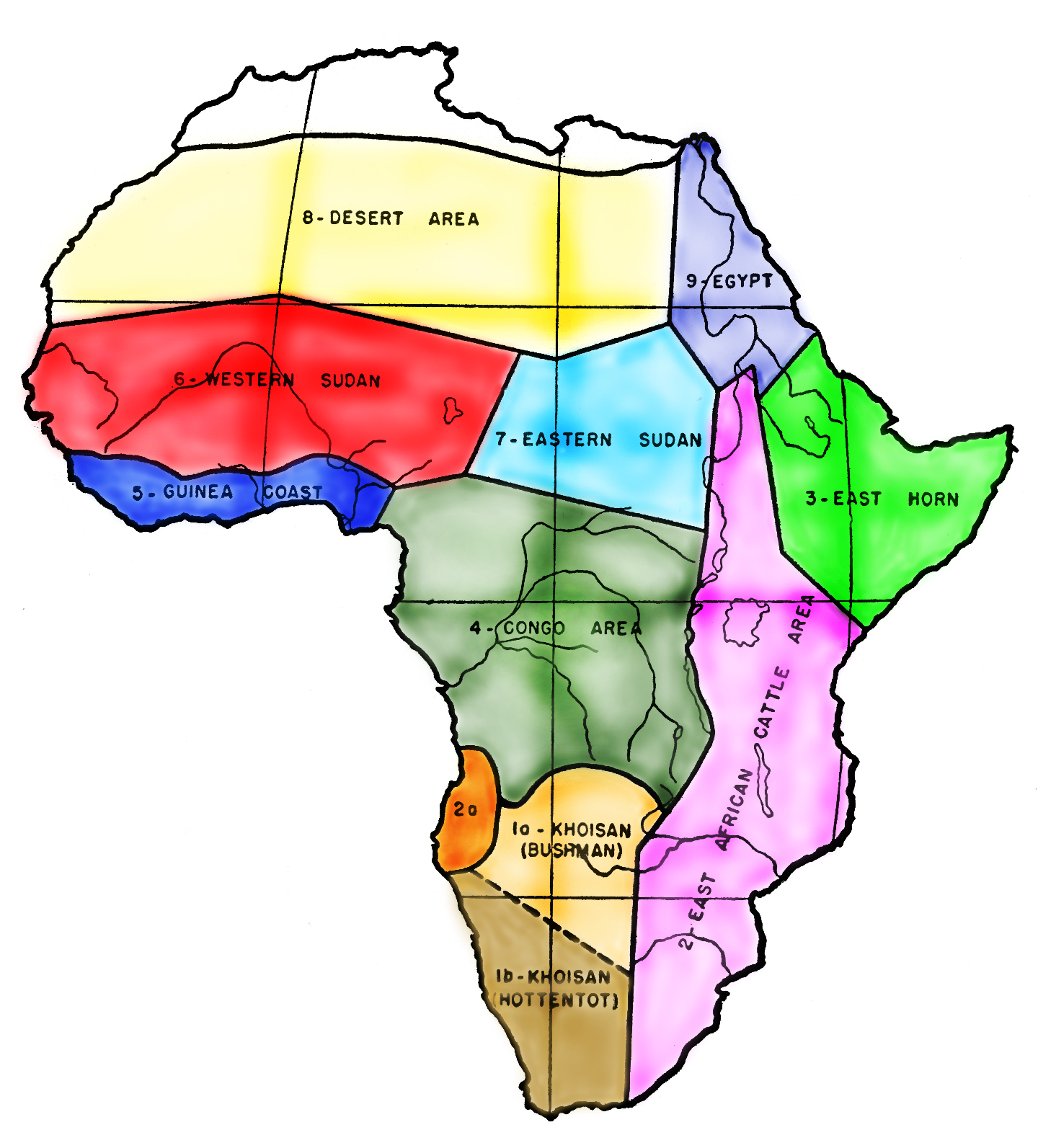
Cultural areas of Africa as defined by Melville J. Herskovits (1945)

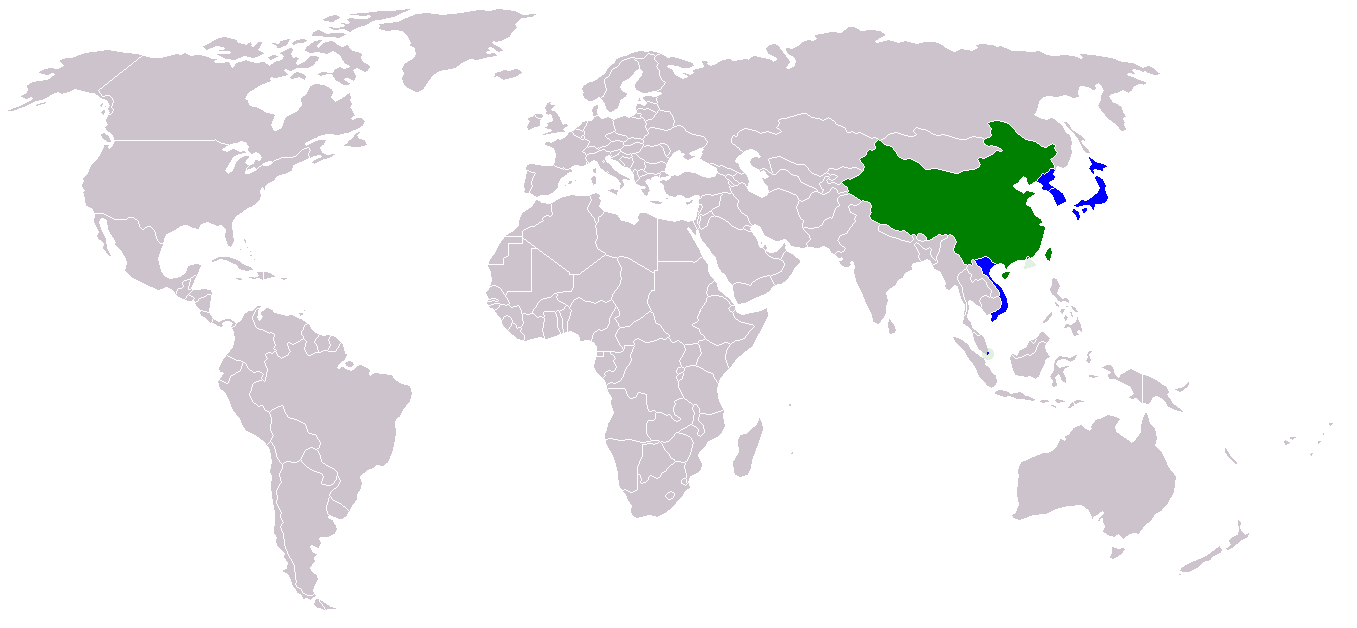
The Sinosphere, consisting of areas with historical influence from Chinese culture

The Celtic nations, homelands of the Celtic languages, can be classed as a cultural region

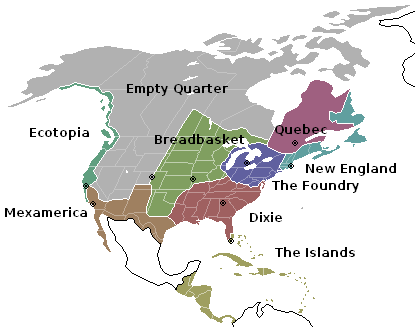
The Nine Nations of North America as defined by Joel Garreau (1981)

In anthropology, geography and history, a cultural area, cultural region, cultural sphere, or culture area refers to a geography with one relatively homogeneous human activity or complex of activities (culture). Such activities are often associated with an ethnolinguistic group and with the territory it inhabits. Specific cultures often do not limit their geographic coverage to the borders of a nation state, or to smaller subdivisions of a state.

== History of concept ==
A culture area is a concept in cultural anthropology in which a geographic region and time sequence (age area) is characterized by shared elements of environment and culture.

A precursor to the concept of culture areas originated with museum curators and ethnologists during the late 1800s as means of arranging exhibits, combined with the work of taxonomy. The American anthropologists Clark Wissler and Alfred Kroeber further developed this version of the concept on the premise that cultural areas represent longstanding cultural divisions. This iteration of the concept is sometimes criticized as arbitrary, but the organization of human communities into cultural areas remains a common practice throughout the social sciences.

Cultural geography also utilizes the concept of culture areas. Cultural geography originated within the Berkeley School, and is primarily associated with Carl O. Sauer and his colleagues. Sauer viewed culture as "an agent within a natural area that was a medium to be cultivated to produce the cultural landscape." Sauer's concept was later criticized as deterministic, and geographer Yi-Fu Tuan and others proposed versions that enabled scholars to account for phenomenological experience as well. This revision became known as humanistic geography. The period within which humanistic geography is now known as the "cultural turn."

The definition of culture areas is enjoying a resurgence of practical and theoretical interest as social scientists conduct more research on processes of cultural globalization.

== Types ==
Allen Noble gave a summary of the concept development of cultural regions using terms such as:

- "Cultural hearth" by Carl Sauer
- "Cultural core" by Donald W. Meinig for Mormon culture published in 1970, and
- "Source area" by Fred Kniffen (1965) and later Henry Glassie (1968) for house and barn types.
  - Outside a core area, Glassie used Meinig's use of the terms "domain" (a dominant area) and "sphere" (area influenced but not dominant).

Cultural "spheres of influence" may also overlap or form concentric structures of macrocultures encompassing smaller local cultures. Different boundaries may also be drawn depending on the particular aspect of interest, such as religion and folklore vs dress, or architecture vs language.

Another version of cultural area typology divides cultural areas into three forms:

1. Formal cultural regions, which are "characterized by cultural homogeneity in a given contiguous geographical area."
2. Functional cultural regions, which share political, social, and/or cultural functions.
3. Perceptual, or vernacular, cultural regions, which are based in spatial perception. One example is Braj region of India, which is seen as a spatial whole due to common religious and cultural associations with the specific area.

== Cultural boundary ==
A cultural boundary (also cultural border) in ethnology is a geographical boundary between two identifiable ethnic or ethnolinguistic cultures. A language border is necessarily also a cultural border, as language is a significant part of a society's culture, but it can also divide subgroups of the same ethnolinguistic group along more subtle criteria, such as the Brünig-Napf-Reuss line in German-speaking Switzerland, the Weißwurstäquator in Germany, or the Grote rivieren boundary between Dutch and Flemish culture.

The following major cultural boundaries are found in the history of Europe:

- in Western Europe: between Latin Europe, where the legacy of the Roman Empire remained dominant, and Germanic Europe, where it was significantly syncretized with Germanic culture
- in the Balkans: the Jireček Line, dividing the area of dominant Latin (Western Roman Empire) from that of dominant Greek (Eastern Roman Empire) influence.

Macro-cultures on a continental scale are also referred to as "worlds", "spheres", or "civilizations", such as the Islamic world.

== Specialized terms ==
=== Cultural bloc ===
The term cultural bloc is used by anthropologists to describe culturally and linguistically similar groups (or nations) of Aboriginal peoples of Australia. It may have been coined first by Ronald Berndt in 1959 to describe the Western Desert cultural bloc, a group of peoples in central Australia whose languages comprise around 40 dialects. Other groups described as a cultural bloc include the Noongar people of south-western Australia; the Bundjalung people of northern New South Wales and southern Queensland; the Kuninjku/Bininj Kunwok bloc and the Yolngu cultural bloc in Arnhem Land, Northern Territory.

== Examples of cultural areas ==
=== Broad dichotomies ===
- East–West dichotomy: the Western civilization and Western world contrasting with the Orient and Eastern world.
- Global North and Global South: the North–South divide is broadly considered a socio-economic and political divide.

=== Geographic areas ===
- Africa
  - East Africa
  - North Africa
    - Maghreb (western and central North Africa)
  - Southern Africa
  - West Africa
- Americas [see also Americas (terminology)]
  - Caribbean
  - Central America
  - Mesoamerica
  - North America
  - Northern America
  - South America
- Australasia
- Pacific islands:
  - Melanesia
  - Micronesia
  - Polynesia
- Europe
  - Central Europe
  - Eastern Europe
    - Baltic states
  - Northern Europe
    - Nordic countries and Scandinavia
  - Southern Europe
    - Iberian Peninsula
  - Western Europe
    - Low Countries
  - Balkans
- Caucasus
- East Asia / Sinosphere
  - China Proper
  - Korean Peninsula
  - Japanese archipelago
  - Manchuria
  - Ryukyu islands
- Indian subcontinent
- Southeast Asia
  - Mainland Southeast Asia and Indochina
  - Maritime Southeast Asia
- Central Asia
- West Asia
  - Anatolia
  - Arabian Peninsula
  - Iranian plateau
  - Levant

=== Language families ===
- Aboriginal Australian languages (with many sub-groups)
- Indigenous languages of the Americas
  - Indigenous peoples of the Pacific Northwest Coast
  - Native Americans in the United States
  - Indigenous peoples of South America
- Catalan-speaking countries
- Celts and Celtic Europe
- English-speaking world (Anglophone)
- German language in Europe
- Latin Europe
- Francophonie
  - Françafrique
  - French America
- Hispanidad
  - Hispanic America
- Lusophone (Portuguese speakers)
- Slavic Europe
  - Russian world
- Baltic Finns, Balts and Baltic Countries
- Arab world
  - Arabic-speaking world
- Hindi Belt (Hindi-Urdu Region)
- Mainland Southeast Asia linguistic area
- Sinophone (Chinese-speaking world)

=== Cultures ===
- Anglosphere
- Arab world
- Cévennes
- Sinosphere (Chinese cultural sphere)
- Greater China
- Greater India and Indosphere
- Greater Iran (Greater Persia)
- Greater Middle East
- Latin America
- Lusophone
- Nordic countries (speaking North Germanic languages)
- Russian world

=== Religious beliefs ===
- Buddhism by country
- Christendom (Christian world), in medieval times referred to as res publica Christiana
  - Christianity by country
- Hinduism by country
- Muslim world
  - Islam by country

=== Music ===
A music area is a cultural area defined according to musical activity. It may or may not conflict with the cultural areas assigned to a given region. The world may be divided into three large music areas, each containing a "cultivated" or classical musics "that are obviously its most complex musical forms", with, nearby, folk styles which interact with the cultivated, and, on the perimeter, primitive styles. (Note: However, Nettl adds that "the world-wide development of music must have been a unified process in which all peoples participated" and that one finds similar tunes and traits in puzzlingly isolated or separated locations throughout the world.)

- Europe and Sub-Saharan Africa
  - based on shared isometric materials, diatonic scales, and polyphony based on parallel thirds, fourths, and fifths.
  - would usually use the natural major scale and minor scale, and Dorian, Lydian and Mixolydian modes.
- North Africa, Southwest Asia, Central Asia, South Asia, Indonesia and parts of Southern Europe.
  - based on shared small intervals in scales, melodies, and polyphony.
  - would usually use the harmonic minor scale and the Phrygian scale.
- American Indian, East Asia, Horn of Africa, Northern Siberian, and Finno-Ugric music
  - based on shared large steps in pentatonic and tetratonic scales.

== See also ==
- Continent
- Classification of indigenous peoples of the Americas
- Cultural landscape
- Cultural geography
- Cultural tourism
- Culture
- Deep map
- Inglehart–Welzel cultural map of the world
- List of Aboriginal Australian group names
- List of music areas in the United States
- Regionalism (politics)
- Social space
- Sprachbund, a group of languages that share some characteristics
- World language
