= Płanetnik =

Demonic creature in Slavic folklore

A płanetnik (also called chmurnik, obłocznik) is a character from Slavic beliefs, a demonic or partly demonic creature which is an embodiment of atmospheric phenomena.

== Background ==
It was believed that płanetniks directed clouds, sent storms and hail. Thus, the name płanetnik is derived from płaneta, meaning a cloud, especially a storm cloud. The alternative names chmurnik and obłocznik are also derived from words which refer to clouds. According to an opposing theory the name is delivered from Latin planeta and is relatively new, in opposition to the Slavic terms chmurnik and obłocznik. In the South Slavic countries, because of the similarity of their functions, płanetniks, which there are called zduhaći, are identified with żmijs.

== Common themes ==
Souls of those who have died suddenly or by suicide become płanetniks, mainly hangmen and floaters. They were imagined as tall, old people in wide hats, or as small creatures. Płanetniks were also identified with snake oil salesmen, the shepherds of the Carpathian Mountains and Podhale, who were local healers. Thus, a płanetnik was a Slavic shaman which could defend against vampires and malevolent spirits. It was believed that the souls of those who had committed suicide, płanetniks, returned to the mortal realm as zduhaczs. It was also believed that their bodies were cursed to be a żmij until the fate of the płanetnik would end, which as a suicide had an aspiration to return from the realm of the dead and to again oppose the vampires.

Planetniks could be benevolent or malevolent. Their favor could be gained by throwing flour in the wind or casting it to the fire. Benevolent płanetniks descended to earth and warned people about storms or protected them against droughts.

Płanetniks were also selected men with the gift of controlling weather. Just before a storm, they were taken to the sky, sometimes by rainbows, where they would fight dragons symbolized by storm and hail clouds, or they would go into the fields and cast away the storm with magic spells.

The name płanetnik also described those who practiced divination of weather or who controlled it.

== Representation ==
The płanetnik often appears in the literature of Young Poland, for instance in Powieść o Płanetniku (Novel about the płanetniks) by Antoni Lange or Płanetnicy (Płanetniks) by Władysław Orkan, as well as in the stories of Bolesław Leśmian such as Strój (from the novel Łąka). The protagonist of the novel Syn boginki by Adolf Dygasiński also becomes a płanetnik.
