= Alhkwʼntam =

Creator god in Nuxalk religion

Alhkwʼntam is a spirit in Nuxalk religion, titled 'Maker of All Things'. At the beginning of time, he created the Four Supernatural Carpenters (Masmasalanixw), and directed them to carve the first human beings from the cosmic tree (Tcncniyaaq).
