= Kumugwe =

Kumugwe (also Komokwa or Goomokwey) (pronounced "koo-moo-gwee") is a figure in the mythology of Pacific Northwest peoples. Known as "Copper-Maker", he is the god of the undersea world revered by the Kwakwakaʼwakw indigenous nation. He has a house under the sea filled with riches and his name means "wealthy one". He is sometimes identified as one and the same as Qaniqilak, the spirit of the summer fishing season, and is then regarded as the adversary of Tseiqami otherwise known as Thunderbird, the guiding spirit of the Winter Hamatsa Dance season.

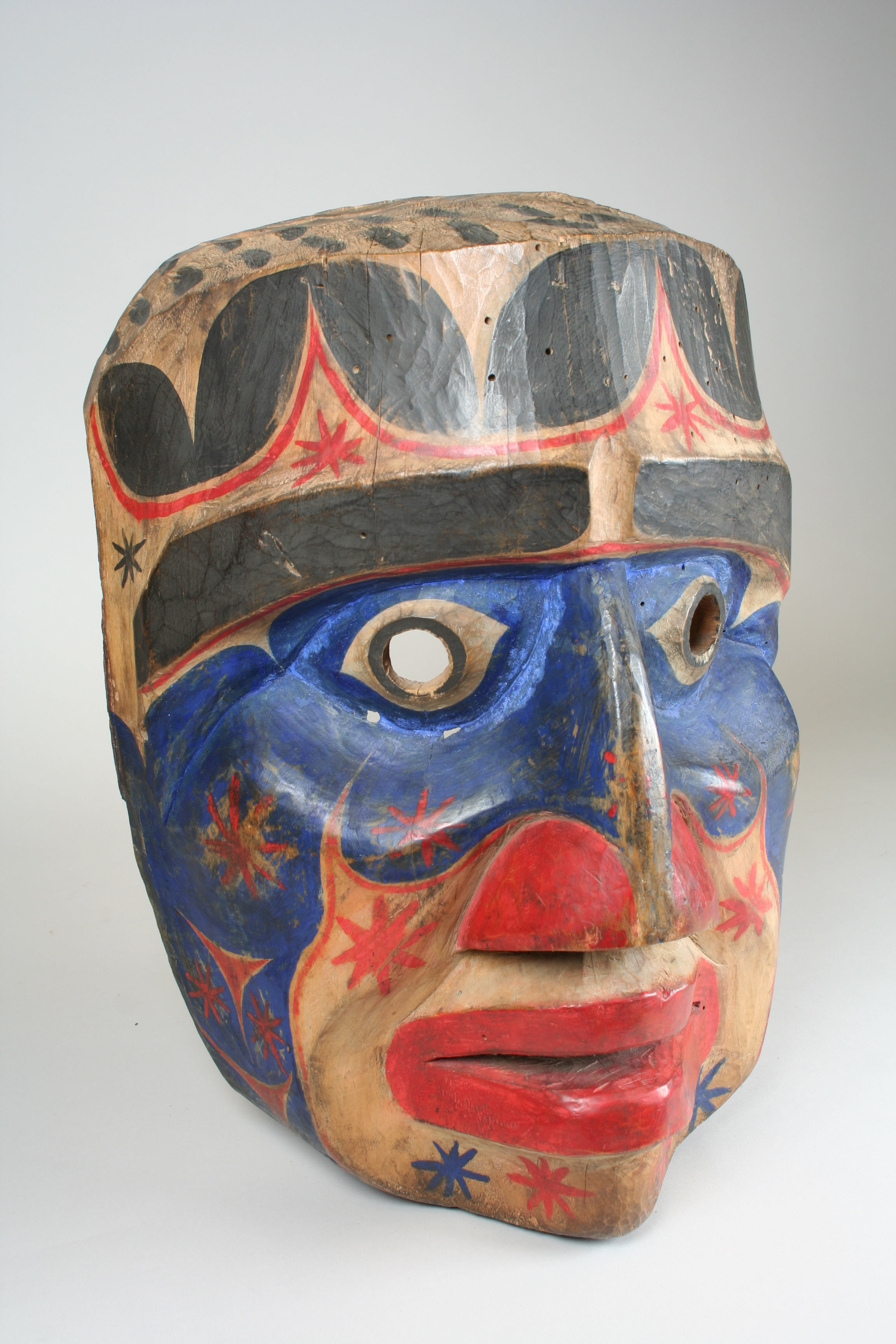
Mask representing Komokwa

Kumugwe is master of the seals. The posts and beams of his house are living sea lions. Sometimes he appears on the surface of the sea, but his head is so big that it looks like an island. He is responsible for the rising and ebbing of the tides as well as the riches these tides deposit on beaches and those claimed by the vagaries of sea weather, both material and human lives. One story recounts how he eats human eyes as if they were crab apples. Kumugwe has the power to see into the future, heal the sick and injured, and bestow powers on those whom he favors.

Many heroes went on quests to reach his undersea abode; those who made it were rewarded with riches and spirit magic. His world is guarded by the octopus. Sometimes Kumugwe himself is conceived of in octopus form. Kumugwe would teach the hero who entered his abode the ways of the sea and give him gifts of blankets, coppers, songs, masks, and regalia. These items of mystical regalia are called Tlugwe (or Tlokwe) in Kwak'wala.

One of Kumugwe's epithets is "Copper Maker." He has a wife named Tlakwakilayokwa, which means "Born to Be Copper Maker's Woman." She is also sometimes named Kominaga.

Masks of Kumugwe often show him with sea creature attributes, such as rounded fish eyes, rows of gills at the corners of his mouth, fins encircling his head, the suction cups of an octopus, and fish and aquatic birds which frame or sit upon his head. His most important totemic animals are loons, seals, sea lions, octopuses, orcas, and sculpins.
