= Dantsikw =

Dance props of the Kwakwaka'wakwa people

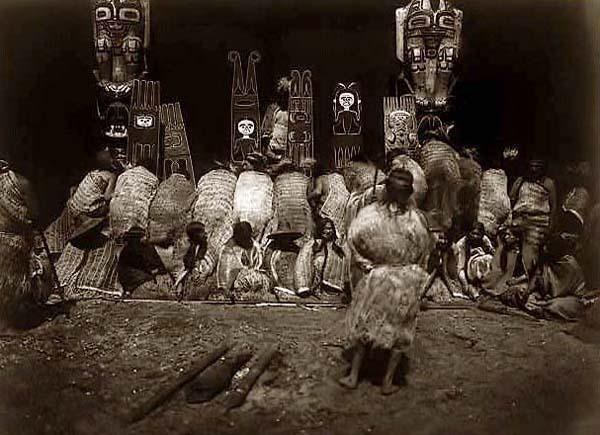
Kwakwaka'wakw power boards in Edward Curtis' "In the Land of the Head Hunters".

Dantsikw (power boards) are dance props of the First Nations Kwakwaka'wakwa people of British Columbia, in Canada. These boards were employed during the Winter Ceremonials (Tseka). In the Tuxwid ("One Who Traveled") warrior ceremony, the initiates would demonstrate supernatural powers granted by Winalagilis by summoning Dantsikw power boards from underground, and making them disappear again. This act commemorates Winalagalis' supernatural canoe that could travel underground.

Shamans might also use dantsikw to construct a representation of the Land-Otter canoe as a vehicle to travel to the spirit world.
