= Winalagalis =

Kwakwaka'wakw war god

The Kwakwaka'wakw warrior spirit, Winalagalis.

Winalagalis is a war god of the Kwakwaka'wakw native people of British Columbia. He travels the world, making war. Winalagilis comes from North (underworld) to winter with the Kwakwaka'wakw (formerly known, incorrectly, as the Kwakiutl). Winalagalis is the bringer and ruler of Tseka (Winter Ceremonial), and imbues red cedar bark with supernatural power.

Winalagalis is associated with a magical war canoe (alternately described as made of copper, a sisiutl, invisible, able to travel underground, & permanently fused with Winalagalis). He is also described as thin, tall, black, with bat-like eyes.

Winalagalis' ceremonies include the Tuxwid and Hawinalal warrior invincibility dances, and the ma'maka (disease thrower) dance. In the Hawinalal, dancers don sisiutl girdles, are pierced through back & thigh skin with skewers, and suspended from the rafters of the plank house to demonstrate invincibility & immunity from pain.

He is announced by whistles & bull-roarers (the voice of Winalagalis).

== See also ==
- Sisiutl
- Dantsikw
- Winalagalis Treaty Group
