= Tlugwe =

Columbian language

Długwe' (also spelled λugʷē), or tlogwe, in the Kwak'wala language of the Kwakwaka'wakw people in British Columbia, means 'supernatural treasure'. Długwe' are one of the most important features of Kwakwaka'wakw religious practices.

They include songs, clan stories, dances, masks, and regalia used in ceremonies to connect the world of the living with the world of the spirits. Długwe' must be guarded carefully. The material objects are stored in boxes and hidden away in Kwakwaka'wakw clan houses, and only taken out on solemn occasions when they will be animated and used to bring the spirit world into the presence of mortals in ceremonial fashion.

The intangible długwe' are taught only the legitimate heirs who bear the appropriate clan insignia and hereditary or spiritual title to sing, recite, or dance them. Długwe' belong to persons who have been granted secret initiatory names representing a limited number of ancestors from the mythical, primeval days. They must be inherited by blood ties, given in payment by their previous owners to honor a marriage or other historical occasion of importance to the clan, moitie or tribe, or won in battle from a subjugated clan or tribe.

== Bibliography ==
- Goldman, Irving (1975). The Mouth of Heaven: An introduction to Kwakiutl religious thought. John Wiley & Sons. ISBN 0-471-31140-5.
