= Sisiutl =

Legendary creature in indigenous cultures of the Pacific Northwest

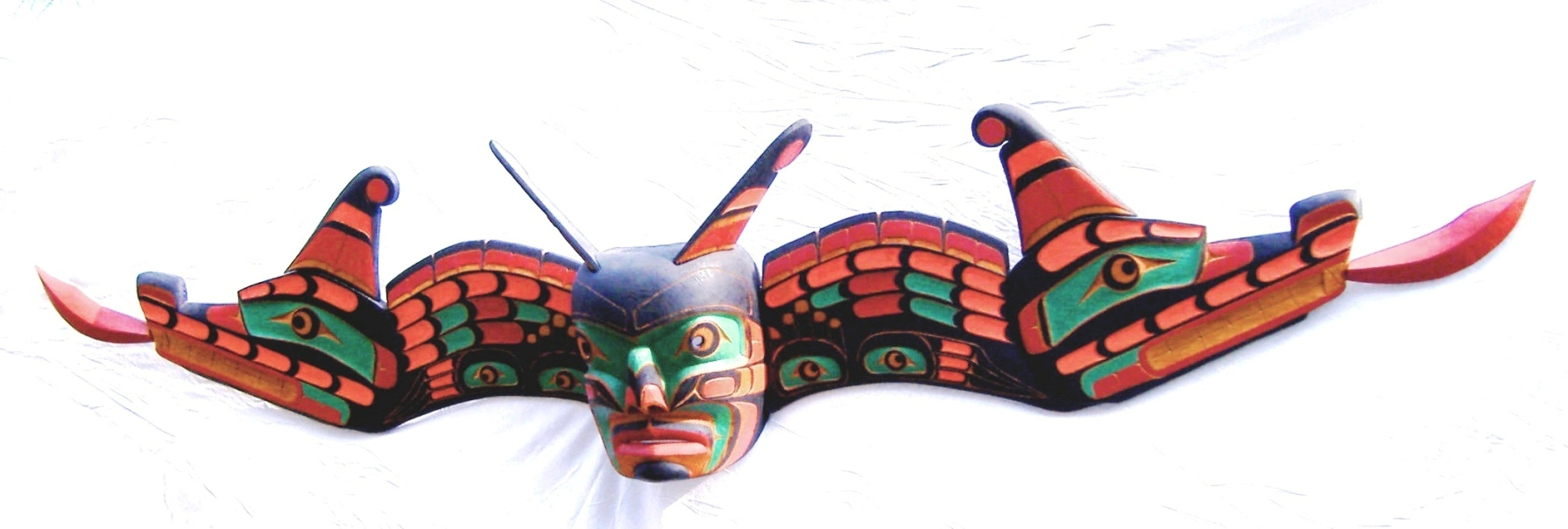
A Kwakwaka'wakw Sisiutl dance mask made of cedar by Oscar Matilpi.

The sisiutl is a legendary creature found in many cultures of the Indigenous peoples of the Pacific Northwest Coast, notably the Kwakwakaʼwakw. Typically, it is depicted as a double-headed sea serpent. Sometimes, the symbol features an additional central face of a supernatural being. The sisiutl features prominently in Pacific Northwest art, dances and songs. The sisiutl is closely associated with shamans because both are seen as mediators between the natural and supernatural worlds.

== Design ==
The sisiutl is typically depicted as a double-headed serpent, although it is sometimes shown with just one head. Kwakwaka'wakw depictions often show a central, humanoid face between the double heads. All three heads are usually horned, and the serpent heads typically have protruding tongues and spiral or upturned noses, with crescents along the body. Among Pacific Northwest cultures, horns or plumes indicate a supernatural being. The spiral nose (or "inflated nostrils") motif is used on Hamatsa masks depicting Baxbaxwalanuksiwe, where it indicates hunger (dilated nostrils to sniff out food). The protruding tongue is associated with lightning, supernatural power, and the transfer of power from an animal source to a novice. Crescents may represent stylised scales or the segments of a caterpillar.

Other depictions, by the Kwakwaka'wakw or other Pacific Northwest peoples, omit or modify some of these features. The Tlingit "grubworm" or "woodworm" (caterpillar) is a "peculiarly northern" variation that lacks the central head, and has an insatiable appetite.

Where a central humanoid head is depicted, it most often is taken to represent Baxbaxwalanuksiwe, although it has also been associated with Qomoqua. In the northern grubworm variant, the central head is believed to be the princess who suckled the grubworm.

The sisiutl also sometimes takes the form of a canoe, as in a myth where it returns a woman from Qomoqua's spiritual realm to her home village, or a squirrel.

== Indigenous practices ==
Shamans of various indigenous tribes believed that killing the sisiutl would transfer its healing magic to them. Warriors similarly believed that its blood would make them invincible in battle, and they would often accessorize their cultural garb with images of the sisiutl for this magical protection. Similar designs were painted onto canoes or carved into wooden entrances to ward off evil spirits. For some tribes, the beach mineral mica was believed to be the scales of the sisiutl, and as such would be incorporated into these aforementioned traditions accordingly.

== See also ==
- Winalagalis
- Dantsikw
