= List of Greek deities =

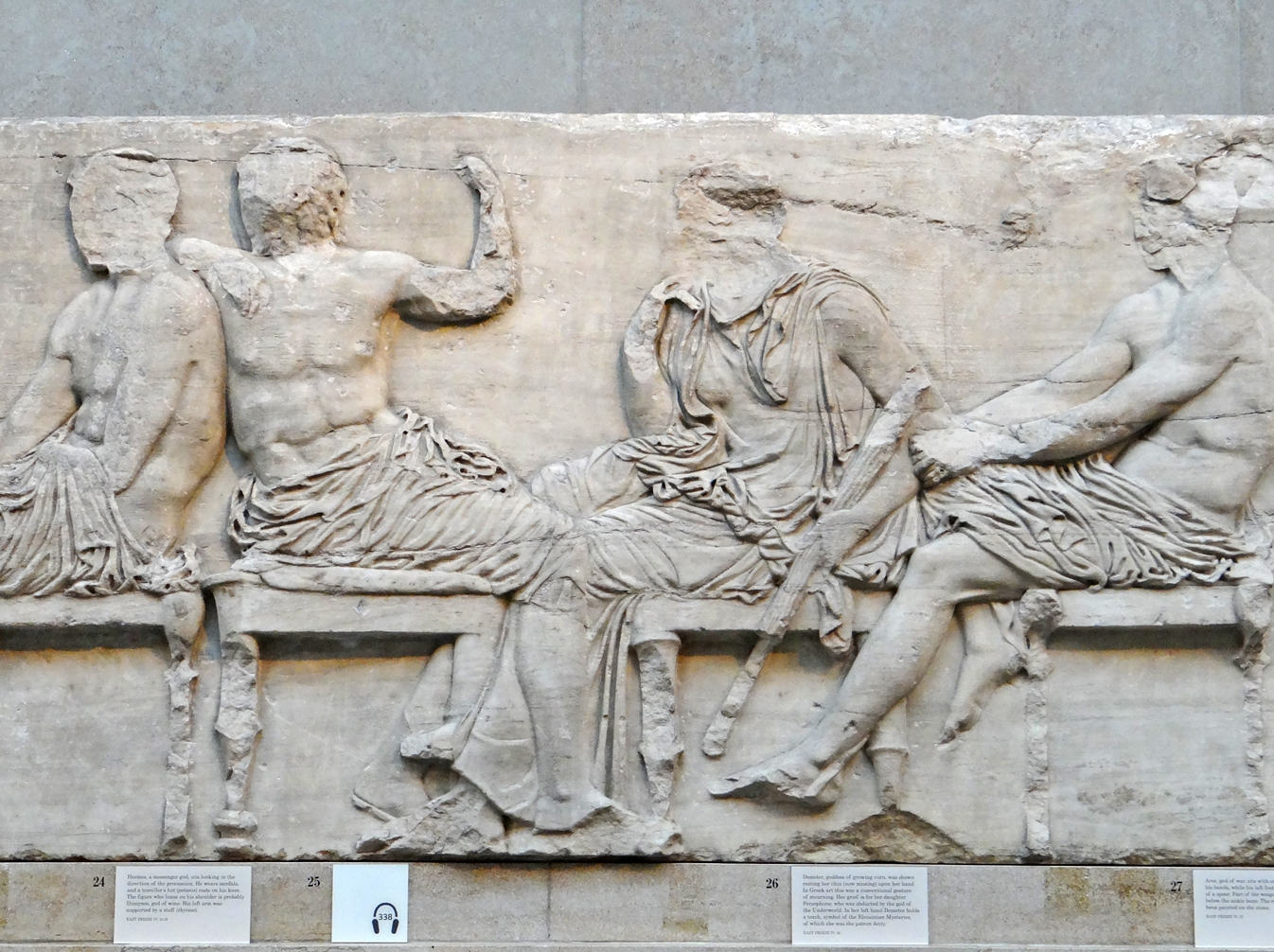
From left to right are seated Hermes, Dionysus (probably), Demeter, and Ares. Block IV from the east frieze of the Parthenon, c. 438–432 BC.

In ancient Greece, deities were regarded as anthropomorphic, immortal, and powerful. They were conceived of as persons rather than abstract concepts, and were described as similar to humans in appearance, albeit larger and more beautiful. The emotions and actions of deities were largely the same as those of humans; they frequently engaged in sexual activity, and were jealous and amoral. Deities were considered far more knowledgeable than humans, and it was believed that they conversed in a language of their own. Their immortality, the defining marker of their godhood, meant that they ceased aging after growing to a certain point. In place of blood, their veins flowed with ichor, a substance which was a product of their diet, and conferred upon them their immortality. Divine power allowed the gods to intervene in mortal affairs in various ways: they could cause natural events such as rain, wind, the growing of crops, or epidemics, and were able to dictate the outcomes of complex human events, such as battles or political situations.

As ancient Greek religion was polytheistic, a multiplicity of gods were venerated by the same groups and individuals. The identity of a deity was demarcated primarily by their name, which could be accompanied by an epithet (a title or surname). Religious epithets could refer to specific functions of a god, to connections with other deities, or to a divinity's local forms. The Greeks honoured the gods by means of worship, as they believed deities were capable of bringing to their lives positive outcomes outside their own control. Greek cult, or religious practice, consisted of activities such as sacrifices, prayers, libations, festivals, and the building of temples. By the 8th century BC, most deities were honoured in sanctuaries (temenē), sacred areas which could include altars and temples, and were typically dedicated to a single deity. Aspects of a god's cult such as the kinds of sacrifices made to them and the placement of their sanctuaries contributed to the distinct conception worshippers had of them.

In addition to a god's name and cult, their character was determined by their mythology (the collection of stories told about them) and their iconography (how they were depicted in ancient Greek art). A deity's mythology told of their deeds, which played a role in establishing their functions, and genealogically linked them to gods with similar functions. The most important works of mythology were the Homeric epics, including the Iliad (c. 750–700 BC), an account of a period of the Trojan War, and Hesiod's Theogony (c. 700 BC), which presented a genealogy of the pantheon. (Note: Price, pp. 12–13. For these datings, see Latacz, C. Time, para. 1 and Hard, p. 21.) Myths known throughout Greece had different regional versions, which sometimes presented a distinct view of a god according to local concerns. Some myths attempted to explain the origins of certain cult practices, and some may have arisen from rituals. Artistic representations allow us to understand how deities were depicted over time, and works such as vase paintings sometimes substantially predate literary sources. Art contributed to how the Greeks conceived of the gods, and depictions would often assign deities certain symbols, such as the thunderbolt of Zeus or the trident of Poseidon.

The principal figures of the pantheon were the twelve Olympians, thought to live on Mount Olympus and to be connected as part of a family. Zeus was considered the chief god of the pantheon, though Athena and Apollo were honoured in a greater number of sanctuaries in major cities, and Dionysus is the deity who has received the most attention in modern scholarship. Beyond the central divinities of the pantheon, the Greek gods were numerous. Some parts of the natural world, such as the earth, sea, or Sun, were held as divine throughout Greece, while other natural deities, such as the various nymphs and river gods, were primarily of local significance. Personifications of abstract concepts appeared frequently in Greek art and poetry, though many were also venerated in cult, some as early as the 6th century BC. Groups or societies of deities could be purely mythological in importance, such as the Titans, or they could be the subject of substantial worship, such as the Muses or Charites.

== Major deities in Greek religion ==
The following section is based upon Walter Burkert's Greek Religion (1985), particularly his chapter "III: The Gods". (Note: Burkert 1985, pp. 119–189. The deities listed here are the same as those discussed by Burkert, with the following exceptions: the nymphs have been omitted (and instead listed under § Groups of divinities and nature spirits, where their inclusion is prefaced by a discussion of their mortality), and Isis, Men, and Serapis have been added under § Foreign deities worshipped in Greece. The subsection § Chthonic deities is loosely based upon Burkert's section "IV 3. Olympian and Chthonic", and the figures in § Other major deities are from "III 3.1. Lesser Gods", "III 3.2. Societies of Gods", and "IV 4. Figures who cross the Chthonic–Olympian Boundary". Hestia, who Burkert includes in "III 3.1. Lesser Gods", has instead been listed under § Twelve Olympians.)

=== Twelve Olympians ===
The main deities of the Greek pantheon were the twelve Olympians. They were believed to reside on Mount Olympus, from which they derived their name, and were connected as part of a familial group which had Zeus at its head. This family included two generations: the first consisted of children of Cronus and Rhea – Zeus, Poseidon, Hera, Demeter, and Hestia – and the second consisted of children of Zeus – Athena, Apollo, Artemis, Ares, Hephaestus, Aphrodite, Hermes, and Dionysus (though Aphrodite and Hephaestus were sometimes said to not be children of Zeus). In myth, the Olympians were preceded by another group of gods, the Titans (among them Cronus and Rhea), who were supplanted by Zeus and the Olympian gods in a war known as the Titanomachy, after which Zeus became ruler of the gods.

In cult, the notion of the twelve gods (or Dodekatheon) is first attested in the latter half of the 6th century BC, when the Altar of the Twelve Gods was constructed in Athens. Around the same time, the Homeric Hymn to Hermes referred to the division of a sacrifice into twelve pieces, and in 484 BC the poet Pindar mentioned the honouring of twelve gods at Olympia. By the classical period (c. 5th–4th centuries BC), this idea of twelve gods had become established. Although the Olympians were consistently considered twelve in number, the individual gods which comprised this group of twelve could differ by region; in particular, Hestia and Dionysus were sometimes excluded. Although Hades is the brother of the first-generation Olympians, he was not included among the twelve Olympians owing to his residency in the underworld. In addition to the canonical twelve Olympians, there were numerous other gods generally believed to live on Olympus.

List of the thirteen deities commonly included among the Twelve Olympians, with an image and description of each
Name	Image	Description
Aphrodite	Statue of Aphrodite with short hair and light drapery	The goddess of sexual love and beauty. In the Iliad she is the child of Zeus and Dione, while in Hesiod's Theogony she is born from the castrated genitals of Uranus. She was worshipped throughout the Hellenic world, and her most renowned cults were located on the island of Cyprus. Many scholars believe she was Near-Eastern in origin, and others argue she was derived from a Cypriot goddess who contained indigenous elements. In the Odyssey she is the wife of Hephaestus, though she fornicates with Ares, and the two are caught in sexual embrace by an invisible net crafted by her husband. Elsewhere in myth, she has affairs with mortals such as Adonis and Anchises, and provides help to mortal lovers while punishing those who spurn love. In art, she is portrayed from the 7th century BC as a robed figure, with various nude and semi-nude depictions being produced in the Hellenistic period (c. 323–30 BC). Her symbols include various birds, especially doves. Her Roman counterpart is Venus.
Apollo	Apollo, holding a kithara, beside a black bird	The son of Zeus and Leto, and the twin brother of Artemis. His various functions and associations include healing, music, archery and prophecy, and he has often been characterised as the "most Greek" of the gods. Apollo's cult existed across the Greek world, and was already dispersed by the beginning of the 7th century BC; it seems to have arrived during the Early Iron Age (c. 1200–700 BC). In the 5th century BC, his worship was introduced to Rome, where he was revered primarily as a god of healing. In mythology, he slays the dragon Python, who guards an oracle of Themis at Delphi, before taking over the shrine for himself. He has numerous love affairs with nymphs and women such as Daphne and Cyrene, and with men such as Hyacinth, though he was often unsuccessful in his amorous pursuits. In art, he is depicted as a youth, usually without a beard, and is commonly portrayed as a lyre player or archer. From the 5th century BC, he was often equated with the Sun.
Ares	Statue of Ares, young, seated, and with short hair	The god of war. He is the son of Zeus and Hera, and the lover of Aphrodite, by whom, in the Theogony, he is the father of Deimos, Phobos and Harmonia. His cult was fairly limited, with his temples located mostly on Crete and in the Peloponnese, and he often appeared alongside Aphrodite in cult. In the Iliad, he is depicted in a largely negative manner, as a brash and wild warrior; he supports the Trojan side of the war, and is frequently presented in opposition to Athena. In ancient art, he is depicted early on as a warrior, bearded and generally holding a spear and shield, though in the classical period (c. 5th–4th centuries BC) he can be found as a beardless and more youthful figure. His Roman counterpart is Mars.
Artemis	Statue of Artemis reaching into her quiver	The daughter of Zeus and Leto, and the twin sister of Apollo. She presided over transitions (such as coming of age), and was associated with hunting and the wild. Her cult was the most far-reaching of any goddess, and she governed female and male initiation rites. She was among the oldest of the Greek gods, and was closely linked with Anatolia. In Homeric epic, she is described as a talented hunter who traverses the Arcadian mountains, accompanied by a retinue of nymphs. She remains a young maiden and virgin indefinitely, and men who attempt to violate her chastity generally face severe consequences. She swiftly punishes mortals who display arrogance towards her or fail to honour her properly, and she is said to unexpectedly and suddenly kill mortal women. In art, she is often depicted as a hunter carrying a bow and arrow and wearing a dress, though from the 7th century BC there exist depictions of her as Potnia Theron ('Mistress of Animals'). Her Roman counterpart is Diana.
Athena	Athena, holding a spear and shield, slays a Giant	A daughter of Zeus, who is born from his head after he swallows her mother, Metis. She originated from a Minoan or Mycenaean goddess, and it is likely her name derives from that of Athens. Throughout Greece she was the foremost polis (city-state) deity, and in poleis (pl. of 'polis') her temple was typically located on the citadel; the nexus of her worship was the Athenian Acropolis, upon which she had a temple by the 8th or 7th century BC. She is both a virgin goddess and a warrior, and is the patroness of all forms of craftsmanship. In mythology, she competes with Poseidon for the patronage of Athens, besting him by offering its inhabitants the olive tree. She provides aid to male heroes, helping figures such as Heracles, Perseus, and Bellerophon in their quests. In her earliest known artistic depictions, she wears a helmet and carries a spear and lance, and from around 600 BC can be found holding a shield adorned with a gorgoneion (a Gorgon's head). Her Roman counterpart is Minerva.
Demeter	Bust of Demeter, wearing a polos	The goddess of agriculture. She is the daughter of Cronus and Rhea, and the mother of Persephone by Zeus. She and her daughter were intimately connected in cult, and the two were honoured in the Thesmophoria festival, which included only women. Demeter presided over the growing of grain, and was responsible for the lives of married women. Her most important myth is that of her daughter's abduction, in which Persephone is stolen by Hades and taken into the underworld. Hearing her daughter's screams as she is taken, Demeter traverses the earth to look for her; local versions of the story tell of her interactions with mortals during the search. This myth, which first survives in the Homeric Hymn to Demeter (7th–6th century BC), was central to the Eleusinian Mysteries, the most ancient Greek mystery religion. In art, Demeter is typically depicted as a clothed figure, and her iconographic features include the polos (a cylindrical headdress), sheaf, and torch. Her Roman counterpart is Ceres.
Dionysus	Dionysus, riding a cheetah and holding a thyrsus	The son of Zeus and the mortal woman Semele. He is the "most versatile and elusive" Greek deity (according to Albert Henrichs), and is the god who has received the greatest attention in modern scholarship. He is the god of wine, intoxication, and ecstasy, and is associated with theatre, eroticism, masks, and madness. His name is attested in Mycenaean Greece (c. 1750–1050 BC), and on Keos there is evidence of him being worshipped continuously from the 15th century BC. His cult was more far-reaching than that of any other Greek god. His festivals, which existed across the Greek world, often featured drunkenness and revelry; they included the Anthesteria, the Agrionia, the Rural Dionysia, and the City Dionysia. In myth, his pregnant mother dies upon seeing Zeus in the form in which he appears to Hera, with Zeus stitching the infant into his thigh, from which he is later born. He is accompanied by a retinue of satyrs, maenads, and silenoi, and is said to travel with his followers to locations such as Egypt and India. His artistic depictions are more numerous than those of any other god. Prior to 430 BC, he is portrayed as a bearded and clothed adult, often adorned with an animal skin, while later representations depict him as a beardless, effeminate youth.
Hephaestus	Hephaestus, handing armour to Thetis	The god of fire and metalworking. He is the son of Hera, either on her own or by Zeus. He is non-Greek in origin, and his cult was probably imported from Anatolia. He was worshipped on the island of Lemnos, and more famously at Athens, where he was linked with Athena. In Homeric epic he is the smith of the gods, who produces creations such as the shield of Achilles; he has crippled feet, and is an outcast among the Olympians. He is said to be hurled from Olympus as an infant, either by Zeus (landing on Lemnos) or by Hera (landing in the sea). His wife is either the unfaithful Aphrodite or Aglaea, one of the Charites. In art, he is depicted as wearing a pilos (a felt hat) from the 5th century BC, and can be found holding an axe or hammer. His Roman counterpart is Vulcan.
Hera	Statue of Hera, holding a staff	The wife of Zeus, and the daughter of Cronus and Rhea. She is strongly associated with marriage, and is the queen of the gods. She probably descended from a goddess who was worshipped in Mycenaean Greece (c. 1750–1050 BC). She had some of the oldest sanctuaries, which often contained immense temples, and her two most important locations of worship were the Heraion of Argos and the island of Samos. She was venerated in her role as the wife of Zeus, and as a city goddess. By her husband she is the mother of Ares, Hebe, and Eileithyia, and in myth she is a jealous wife who torments Zeus's mistresses and other children. In artistic depictions featuring groups, she can sometimes be distinguished as a figure in bride's attire, accompanying Zeus, and in scenes of hieros gamos ('sacred marriage') she is portrayed as a matronly figure. Features of her depictions include clothing drawn around her head (similarly to a veil), the patera (a shallow bowl), the sceptre, and the pomegranate. Her Roman counterpart is Juno.
Hermes	Statue of Hermes, nude and with drapery over his arm	The son of Zeus and the nymph Maia. He is the messenger and herald of the gods, the god of boundaries and their crossing, and a trickster deity. He probably derives from a god of Mycenaean Greece (c. 1750–1050 BC), and the most ancient location of his cult was the region of Arcadia, where his worship was especially prevalent. His cult was spread throughout the Peloponnese, and was very old in Athens. He was closely linked with herms (stone statues which marked various kinds of boundaries), and was the patron of shepherds, especially young men whose job was to protect crops from cattle. In myth, he steals the cattle of Apollo as a new-born, eventually receiving the herd from the god by gifting him the lyre, which he creates from a tortoise's shell. In art, his symbols include the caduceus and winged sandals; he usually has a beard prior to the 4th century BC, with beardless depictions later becoming more common. His Roman counterpart is Mercury.
Hestia	Upper portion of a statue of Hestia	The goddess of the hearth. She is the daughter of Cronus and Rhea. Her role in mythology is minimal, and she is never fully anthropomorphic. In cultic activity, she is always the deity who receives the first offering or prayer, and she was venerated in each city's communal hearth, or prytaneion. She is a virgin goddess who forever retains her chastity, and rejects the advances of male deities such as Apollo and Poseidon. Her Roman counterpart is Vesta.
Poseidon	Poseidon, robed and holding his trident	The god of the sea, earthquakes, and horses. He is the son of Cronus and Rhea, and the brother of Zeus and Hades. He was an important deity in Mycenaean Greece (c. 1750–1050 BC), but through the archaic period (c. 800–480 BC) his position receded. He had sanctuaries in many coastal locations, though he was also worshipped in inland areas, where he was associated with bodies of water such as pools and streams. His epithets include Hippios (relating to horses), 'Earth-Shaker', and 'Embracer of Earth'. In the Iliad, he and his brothers split the cosmos between themselves, with Poseidon receiving the sea. His wife is Amphitrite, with whom he lives beneath the sea, though he has affairs with numerous women, producing sometimes dangerous or monstrous children. From the 7th century BC, Corinthian votive tablets depict him with his trident and a diadem. In art, it can be difficult to tell him apart from Zeus, and only from the Hellenistic period (c. 323–30 BC) is he found accompanied by marine life, in a chariot pulled by hippocampi. His Roman counterpart is Neptune.
Zeus	Bust of Zeus, with full beard and hair	The chief god of the Greek pantheon. He is the king of the gods, and the most powerful deity. He is the son of the Titans Cronus and Rhea, and the husband of Hera. He is the only Greek god who is unquestionably Indo-European in origin, and he is attested in Mycenaean Greece (c. 1750–1050 BC). His cult existed from the Bronze Age, and was spread across the Greek world, with major temples in Olympia, Athens, and Acragas. His functions and domains are more varied than those of any other Greek god, and over 1000 of his epithets survive. According to Hesiod's Theogony, he attains his power by overthrowing his father and the other Titans in a ten-year war known as the Titanomachy. Through his many amorous encounters with mortal women, he is the father of heroes and progenitors of well-known family lines. Among his symbols are the thunderbolt, the sceptre, and the eagle. In art, from the 6th century BC onwards he is often shown sitting on a throne, or as an upright figure wielding a lightning bolt. His lusting after women is also frequently found on vase paintings of the 5th century BC. His Roman counterpart is Jupiter, also referred to as Jove.

=== Chthonic deities ===
The word "chthonic" is applied to deities who were believed to inhabit the underworld or to be otherwise subterranean in nature, and who were associated with fertility or the dead. Hades and Persephone, the rulers of the underworld, were the principal chthonic deities. They were not the only gods held as chthonic, though such figures were typically only referenced through allusion and with apprehension.

List of the main chthonic deities, with an image and description of each
Name	Image	Description
Hades	Bust of Hades, bearded	The ruler of the underworld and of the dead. He is the child of Cronus and Rhea, and the consort of Persephone. In the Iliad, Hades and his brothers, Poseidon and Zeus, split the world between themselves, with Hades receiving the underworld. He is mentioned under names such as Plouton and "chthonian Zeus", and his titles include Klymenos ('Renowned') and Eubouleus ('Good Counsellor'). In myth, he kidnaps Persephone with Zeus's assent, and takes her into the underworld. While there, she consumes some of his food, forcing her to henceforth spend part of each year in the underworld. He had virtually no role in cult, and was instead worshipped in the form of Plouton (whose cult existed across the Greek world). In artistic depictions, he often holds a sceptre or key, and his appearance is similar to that of Zeus. His name can also denote the underworld itself.
Persephone	Head of Persephone, grey and broken at top	The daughter of Zeus and Demeter. She is the wife of Hades, and queen of the underworld. In her central myth, first narrated in the Homeric Hymn to Demeter (7th–6th century BC), she is seized by Hades while frolicking in a meadow, and carried into the underworld. Zeus asks for her return, but she consumes pomegranate seeds during her stay, and so is forced to spend a part of each year from then on in the underworld. She was frequently found alongside her mother in cult, and the two were honoured in the Thesmophoria festival, as well as the Eleusinian Mysteries. In some places, she was worshipped in conjunction with her husband. In myth, she can also be found in the role of queen of the underworld, a domain over which she has substantial control; she is described as helping certain mortals, such as Heracles and Sisyphus, when they are in the underworld.
Plouton	Upper portion of statue of Plouton	A name for the ruler of the underworld, who is also known as Hades. Plouton is attested from around the beginning of the 5th century BC, before which he is a distinct deity from Hades. The name Plouton is a euphemistic title, which alludes to the riches that exist beneath the earth. He appears in cult linked with Persephone and Demeter, and prior to the Hellenistic period (c. 323–30 BC) his worship is attested almost exclusively in Attica, particularly in relation to the Eleusinian Mysteries. In art, he is depicted with a beard (which is sometimes white), carrying a cornucopia or sceptre.

=== Nature deities ===
While many of the major Greek gods were associated with aspects of nature, various lesser deities are classed as nature gods because they personify particular parts of the natural world. Some such deities stood for parts of nature that played a role in the lives of all people – such as the earth, sea, Sun, Moon, and winds – and so were held as divine throughout Greece (though these gods did not experience the same development in myth and cult as figures such as the Olympians). Other nature deities – the river gods and nymphs, (Note: On the nymphs, see their entry under § Groups of divinities and nature spirits.) who represented features of the landscape such as rivers, springs, or mountains – were each worshipped only in a specific town or area. They were numerous, and their cults were found throughout the Greek world.

List of deities that personify parts of the natural world, with an image and description of each
Name	Image	Description
Achelous	Monochrome illustration of a serpentine Achelous fighting Heracles	One of the river gods, sons of Oceanus and Tethys. He was the god of the Achelous River, the largest river in Greece. The oracle of Zeus at Dodona helped to spread his worship, which began to recede in the 4th century BC. He was often venerated alongside the nymphs. In myth, he fights the hero Heracles for the hand of Deianeira, assuming multiple forms in the battle, including that of a bull; he is beaten when Heracles snaps one of his horns from his head.
Anemoi	Mosaic of a winged Zephyrus	The personifications of the winds. They are typically four in number – Zephyrus (West Wind), Boreas (North Wind), Notus (South Wind), and Eurus (East Wind) – though Hesiod, who describes them as children of Eos and Astraeus, omits Eurus. There survives a reference to a "Priestess of the Winds" from the Mycenaean period (c. 1750–1050 BC), and, of the four winds, Boreas and Zephyrus were worshipped in antiquity. In myth, Boreas is said to kidnap the Athenian princess Orithyia.
Gaia	Upper body of Gaia, with long hair, on a frieze	The personification and goddess of the earth. In Hesiod's Theogony, she is one of the earliest beings in existence, and the progenitor of an extensive genealogy, producing figures such as Uranus and Pontus on her own, and the Titans, Cyclopes, and Hecatoncheires by Uranus. She is capable of prophecy, and is said to precede Apollo as the owner of the oracle of Delphi. In cult, she was more commonly referred to as Ge, and was often venerated alongside Zeus. Her worship existed primarily outside of the polis (city-state), though she was venerated in Athens under the epithet Kourotrophos ('Nurturer of Youths'). (Note: Sourvinou-Inwood 2003a, p. 618. For this translation, see Larson 2007a, p. 47.)
Helios	Helios, flying a four-horse chariot	The Sun and its god. He is the son of the Titans Hyperion and Theia. He is said to travel through the sky each day in a horse-pulled chariot, making his way from east to west. Each night he drifts back to the east in a bowl, through Oceanus (the river thought to wrap around the earth). Although the Sun was universally viewed as divine in Greece, in the classical period (c. 5th–4th centuries BC) it received limited worship. The most important location of Helios's cult was the island of Rhodes, where he was the subject of the Colossus of Rhodes. He was commonly called upon in oaths, as he was believed to witness everything across the earth. He was assimilated with Apollo by the 5th century BC, though their equation was not established until later on.
River gods	Mosaic of a reclining elderly river god	The 3000 male offspring of Oceanus and Tethys, and brothers of the Oceanids. River gods were often locally worshipped in Greek cities, and seen as a representation of a city's identity. Their worship was developed by the time of Homer (c. 750–700 BC); a river god was given a sanctuary in his city, and was honoured with sacrifices of youths' hair. The only river god worshipped throughout Greece was Achelous. Their iconography includes the melding of the human form with bull-like features. Other river gods include Eridanos, Alpheus, and Scamander.

=== Other major deities ===
List of other major deities in Greek religion, with an image and description of each
Name	Image	Description
Asclepius	Bust of Asclepius, with a beard and hat	The god of healing and medicine. In mythology, he is described as a mortal hero, a son of Apollo and Coronis in the usual tradition. While pregnant, Coronis weds the mortal Ischys, leading Apollo to kill her and rescue the infant in the process. Asclepius grows up to become a skilled healer, capable even of bringing the deceased back to life, an activity which leads Zeus to strike him down with lightning. During the archaic era (c. 800–480 BC), his worship was probably centred in Tricca and Messenia, spreading further abroad towards the end of the period. His cult at Epidauros emerged around 500 BC, and in the late 5th century BC he had two sanctuaries in Athens. He was worshipped alongside family members, such as Hygieia, Machaon, and Podalirius. Artistic depictions of Asclepius often portray him sitting on a throne, or as an upright figure holding a staff laden with a snake.
Cabeiri	Vase painting of Cabeiros, reclining, near a snake	A group of divinities venerated in mysteries. Evidence of their worship comes primarily from the island of Lemnos and from Thebes, and they are also attested through the northern Aegean, in Thrace, and at Anthedon. They originated outside of Greece, though there is evidence of their worship in Thebes as early as the 7th century BC. The gods of the mysteries on Samothrace are called Cabeiri by some sources, though only Megaloi Theoi ('Great Gods') and Theoi ('Gods') are mentioned in epigraphic evidence from the island. The Cabeiri are commonly associated with other groups of divinities – such as the Kouretes, Corybantes, and Idaean Dactyls – and their number varies by source. Some authors call them the offspring of Hephaestus.
Charites	White relief of three robed Charites	Goddesses who embody beauty, charm, and grace. In the Theogony there are three Charites – Aglaea, Euphrosyne, and Thalia – who are offspring of Zeus and Eurynome. They are associated with Aphrodite, and are said to be her attendants. The most famous location of their worship was Orchomenus, where they were venerated in the form of three stones. They were also worshipped in Athens and on the island of Paros. In the Iliad, the Charis Pasithea is the wife of Hypnos, while in the Theogony, Aglaea is married to Hephaestus.
Dioscuri	Castor, standing behind a horse, wearing a helmet	A pair of divine twins named Castor and Pollux. The Iliad calls Helen of Troy their sister and Tyndareus their father, though in later sources Polydeuces is the son of Zeus. They are generally considered Indo-European in origin. They were venerated across Greece, with Sparta regarded in antiquity as their primary location of worship. In myth, they are often involved in disputes with other pairs of figures, such as Lynceus and Idas, whose wives they steal, causing a battle (though in an earlier version the dispute arises over cattle). They are also said to retrieve a kidnapped Helen from Attica. In art, their symbols include horses, piloi, and stars.
Eileithyia	Detail of vase, showing Zeus, Athena, and Eileithyia	A goddess associated with birth. In the Theogony, she is the daughter of Zeus and Hera. She is attested in the Bronze Age, and was worshipped at a cave in Amnisos on Crete as early as the Middle Minoan period (c. 2100–1700 BC). She was venerated mostly by women, and in the archaic period (c. 800–480 BC) her worship was found most prominently on Crete, in the Peloponnese, and in the Cyclades. She was also worshipped in numerous locations as an aspect of Artemis.
Enyalius		A war god. He is associated in particular with close-quarters fighting, though the degree to which he is a separate deity from Ares has been debated since antiquity. He is mentioned as early as the Mycenaean period (c. 1750–1050 BC), and his worship is most clearly attested in the Peloponnese. There was a cult dedicated to him in Sparta, where there sat a statue of him bound in chains. In literature, he is little more than an epithet or byname for Ares.
Hecate	Hecate on a frieze, robed and holding a shield	A goddess associated with ghosts and magic. In the Theogony, she is the daughter of Perses and Asteria. She emerged in Caria in Anatolia, and her worship seems to have been taken up by the Greeks during the archaic period (c. 800–480 BC). She is attested in Athens in the 6th century BC, and statues of her stood guard throughout the city by the classical period (c. 5th–4th centuries BC). Hesiod celebrates her in a section of his Theogony, treating her as a mighty goddess who helps various members of society. She was believed to be accompanied by the ghosts of maidens and women who died childless, and was linked with dogs and their sacrifice. Beginning in the 5th century BC, she was assimilated with Artemis. In art, she is depicted with either one or three faces (and sometimes three bodies), and is frequently found wearing a polos (a cylindrical headdress) and carrying torches.
Heracles	Heracles, holding a club and bow	The mightiest of the Greek heroes. He is the son of Zeus and Alcmene, and was considered both a hero and a god. He was worshipped throughout the Greek world (though to a limited extent in Crete), and his cults resembled those of the gods. His cult on the island of Thasos was among his oldest, and he was worshipped in numerous locations in Attica. In Thebes, his cult existed as early as the time of Homer (c. 750–700 BC). In myth, he is said to complete twelve labours on the command of Eurystheus; the canonical set of labours is established by around the end of the archaic era (c. 800–480 BC). His myths often involve him fighting monstrous beasts or humanoid creatures. In art, scenes from his labours survive from the 8th century BC onwards, and his attributes include his cape (made from the Nemean lion's fur), a club, and a bow.
Leto	Leto, standing and robed	The mother of Apollo and Artemis by Zeus. She is the daughter of the Titans Coeus and Phoebe. When pregnant with her twins, she travels to find somewhere she can give birth, but is rebuffed in each location (in some accounts because of the efforts of a jealous Hera), before arriving on Delos, where she eventually delivers both children (though in an early version Artemis is born instead on Ortygia). In cult, she was frequently linked with her children, though in Anatolia she had more importance as an individual, and from the 6th century BC she was worshipped at the Letoon in Lycia.
Leucothea	Head of Leucothea, with expansive hair	A sea goddess. In myth, she is originally a mortal women named Ino, who flees from her frenzied husband with her young son, Melicertes, in her arms. She jumps into the sea, taking her son with her, and the two are deified, becoming Leucothea and Palaemon, respectively. Leucothea was venerated across the Mediterranean world, and was linked with initiation rites, a connection which is probably responsible for her identification with Ino.
Muses	Relief of three robed Muses	Goddesses responsible for inspiring poets and others engaged in creative and intellectual pursuits. In the Theogony, they are the nine daughters of Zeus and the Titan Mnemosyne. Their earliest site of worship was on Mount Olympus, and there was a sanctuary to them at the foot of Mount Helicon. There are different sets of Muses mentioned in relation to different locations, and particular areas of creative activity are said to be governed by individual Muses. As a group, they are commonly associated with Apollo.
Pan	Statue of Pan copulating with a goat	The god of shepherds and goatherds. He originated from the region of Arcadia, and was conceived of as partly human and partly goat. During the 5th century BC, his worship spread from Arcadia to Athens, before being dispersed across the Greek world. He was venerated in caves, sometimes in conjunction with Hermes and the nymphs. There are numerous conflicting versions of his parentage, and in myth he roams the mountains and plays the syrinx. He is a lecherous figure who lusts after both nymphs and young men, though he typically has little success in his amorous pursuits. In art, he is commonly portrayed as ithyphallic.
Prometheus	An eagle pecks at the midriff of a tied Prometheus	The son of the Titan Iapetus. He is credited with the creation of mankind, producing the first human from a lump of clay. He is said to bring fire to humanity, after covertly stealing it from Olympus. This action earns him the punishment of Zeus, who has him attached to a rock face in the Caucasus Mountains, where each day an eagle tears apart his liver, which regenerates over the following night. He is later set free from his punishment by Heracles. The image of his punishment is found in art as early as the 7th century BC, and he is typically portrayed as a bearded figure with an unclothed body and arms bound, while the eagle hovers overhead.
Thetis	Detail of Thetis's face, with short hair	The mother of Achilles. She is one of the Nereids, the daughters of Nereus and Doris. She is courted by Poseidon and Zeus until they hear of a prophecy that any son she bears will overthrow his father, prompting Zeus to wed Thetis to the hero Peleus. Prior to their marriage, Peleus pursues her, with her transforming into different shapes as she flees. After the birth of Achilles, she burns her son in an attempt to make him immortal, an action which leads to the end of her marriage. Her cult existed in Thessaly and Sparta, and she was a popular subject in vase paintings, particularly in the 6th and 5th centuries BC.

=== Foreign deities worshipped in Greece ===
Greek poleis (city-states, sing.: polis) were able to adopt new gods fairly easily, a process which involved starting a cult in their honour. Some deities were introduced from abroad (such as Cybele), experiencing some amount of alteration in the process, and others were original creations (such as Serapis) that pulled from existing divinities of different origins. The choice to adopt a new deity was largely pragmatic, and seems to have been decided through the regular political systems of the polis. Which gods were considered "foreign" (a designation that could include gods from elsewhere in Greece) was also determined by the authority of the polis.

The Greeks thought that different cultures all revered the same set of deities, who were simply known under varying names. Because of this, when the Greeks encountered gods of other cultures, they identified them with their own deities (in a process known as interpretatio).

List of some of the foreign deities worshipped in Greece, with an image and description of each
Name	Image	Description
Adonis	Vase painting including Aphrodite and Adonis	A figure of Levantine origin. He is born of an incestuous union between a Phoenician king and his daughter, Myrrha. Though this genealogy places him as a mortal, in cult he was considered a god. He was worshipped on Lesbos by the beginning of the 6th century BC, and in Athens by the 5th century BC. He was revered primarily by women, who were the participants in the Adonia festival. In myth, he is a young man of great beauty who enchants both Aphrodite and Persephone; it is decided that he spends a part of the year with each goddess.
Ammon	Head of Zeus with horns	The principal deity of the Egyptian pantheon. Because of this position, he was equated by the Greeks with Zeus. He was worshipped at the Siwa Oasis from at least the 6th century BC, and during that century his oracle there came to be widely known. Greek attention towards Ammon was primarily due to the Greek colony of Cyrene in Libya, and by the 4th century BC he was worshipped in Athens.
Cybele	Statue of a robed Cybele, seated	A mother goddess from Anatolia. She is the Anatolian form of a Great Mother goddess, and in Greece she was usually referred to as Meter. During the 6th century BC, her worship proliferated through the Greek world, and in the same century she was introduced in Athens. Upon the spread of her cult, she was identified with Rhea (the mother of the first generation of Olympians), and other goddesses such as Gaia and Demeter; she may also have been identified with an indigenous mother goddess. In artistic depictions, she is found seated on a throne, accompanied by lions and holding a tambourine. Her cult was officially introduced in Rome around the end of the 3rd century AD.
Isis	Relief of Isis, holding grain	An Egyptian goddess. In Egyptian mythology, she is the wife of Osiris and the mother of Horus. She was known to the Greeks as early as the archaic period (c. 800–480 BC), and possessed a temple in Athens by the 4th century BC. In the Graeco-Roman world, she presided over the family, and was a healer and protective figure. Herodotus equates her with Demeter.
Men	Bust of Men, with crescent moons extending from his shoulders	A deity from western Anatolia. He is a moon god, and his worship is most clearly documented in Lydia and Phrygia. He is attested from the 4th century BC, with the earliest evidence of the Hellenistic period (c. 323–30 BC) originating from Greece, particularly Attica. In art, he is found with crescent moons extending up from his shoulders; he typically wears a Phrygian cap and sleeved clothes, and sometimes holds a sceptre or rod.
Sabazios	Bust of Sabazios, bearded	A god from Phrygia in Anatolia. The earliest literary references to him are from the 5th century BC, and his worship in Attica is mentioned in the 4th century BC. He was identified with Dionysus, and an Orphic myth of Dionysus's birth to Zeus and his daughter, Persephone, was linked with the mysteries of Sabazios. In art, he is portrayed either with a beard and Phrygian garb, or in the image of Zeus-Jupiter. There also survive votive hands dedicated to him, which hold objects such as snakes or pine cones.
Serapis	Head of Serapis, bearded, wearing a calathus	A god derived from the syncretic Egyptian figure Osiris-Apis. This Egyptian antecedent had a cult in Memphis, where he was a sacred bull figure. This cult was adapted by the Greeks into that of Serapis; the first three Ptolemies had a Serapeum constructed in Alexandria, and Ptolemy I Soter (c. 367–282 BC) is said to have brought to the city a statue of Pluto, which was given the name of Serapis. The god was identified with Greek deities such as Dionysus, Pluto, and Zeus, and in art he was depicted wearing a calathus (a basket) atop his head. His worship was propagated, with temples built in places such as Athens and Corinth.

== Early deities ==
The following section is structured after the chapter "1. The Early Gods" in Timothy Gantz's Early Greek Myth: A Guide to Literary and Artistic Sources (1993). (Note: Gantz, pp. 1–56. The deities listed here are those discussed by Gantz, and are included under subheadings following the parts of that chapter. There are two exceptions: Nyx's children are omitted (and instead listed under § Abstract personifications), and Dione is included under § The Titans and their descendants (Gantz discusses her in his "Gaia and Ouranus" section).)

In antiquity, the Theogony (c. 700 BC), a work by the Boeotian poet Hesiod, was considered the standard mythological telling of the world's earliest ages. The poem details an extensive genealogy of the gods, and describes the events which led to the current state of the cosmos, under the rule of Zeus. The cosmogonic part of the work, which is fairly brief, begins the account of this mythical history.

Though Hesiod's poem is the only theogony which is extant in its entirety, during the archaic era (c. 800–480 BC) there existed similar works, ascribed to various legendary or historical writers such as Orpheus, Musaeus, Pherecydes, and Epimenides. Of works outside the theogonic genre, Homeric epic only briefly references the world prior to Zeus's rule, and the 1st–2nd-century AD Bibliotheca of Apollodorus provides an account similar to Hesiod's.

=== Primal elements ===
Hesiod's cosmogony begins with Chaos, who is followed by several other primal beings. The poet then details two generations of descendants of Chaos. Later in the poem, he continues his enumeration of her descendants, listing various dismal abstractions who descend from her daughter, Nyx (these figures are listed under § Abstract personifications). Of these primordial figures in Hesiod's poem, deities such as Nyx, Aether, and Eros feature in a number of other early cosmogonies.

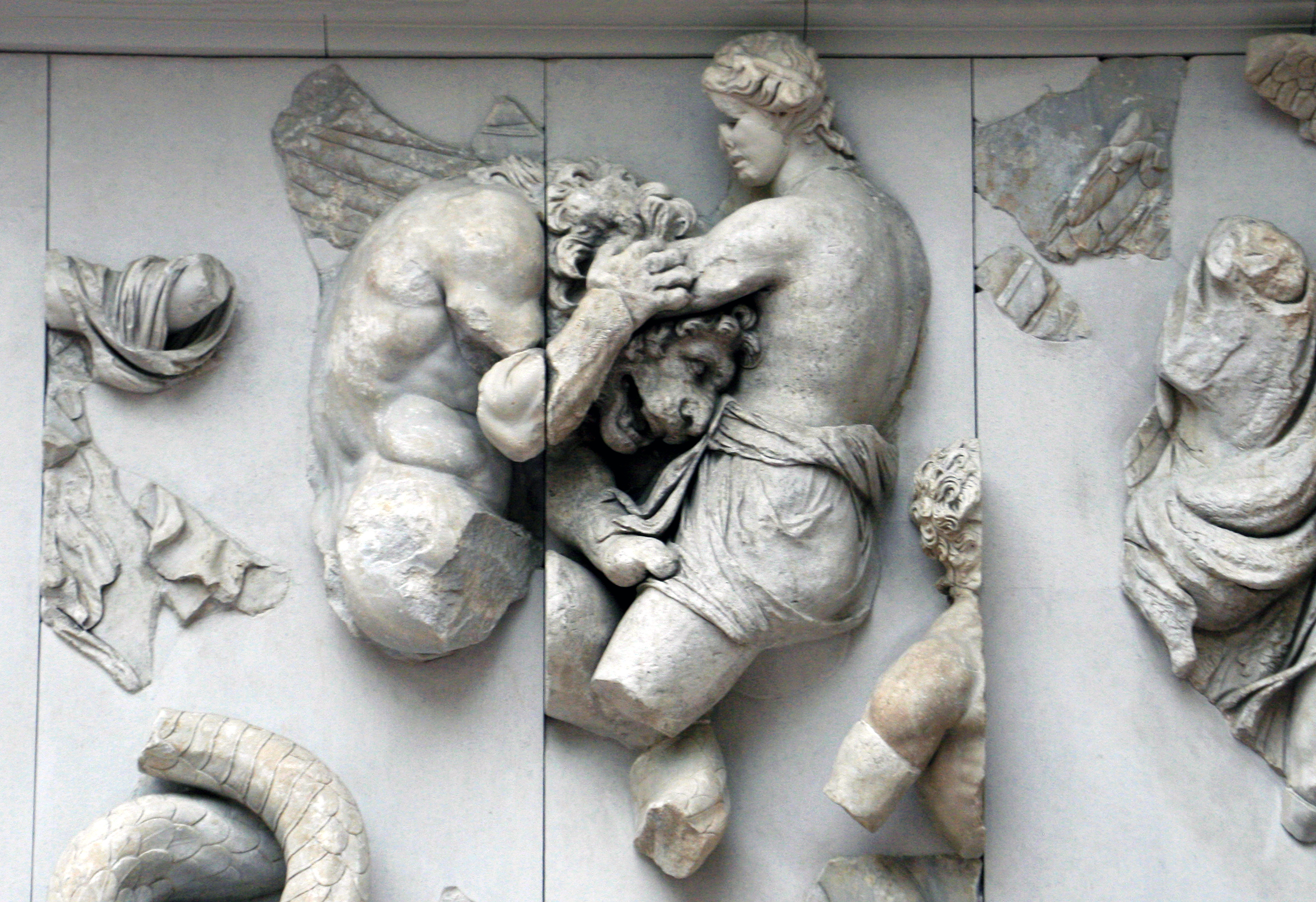
Aether (right)

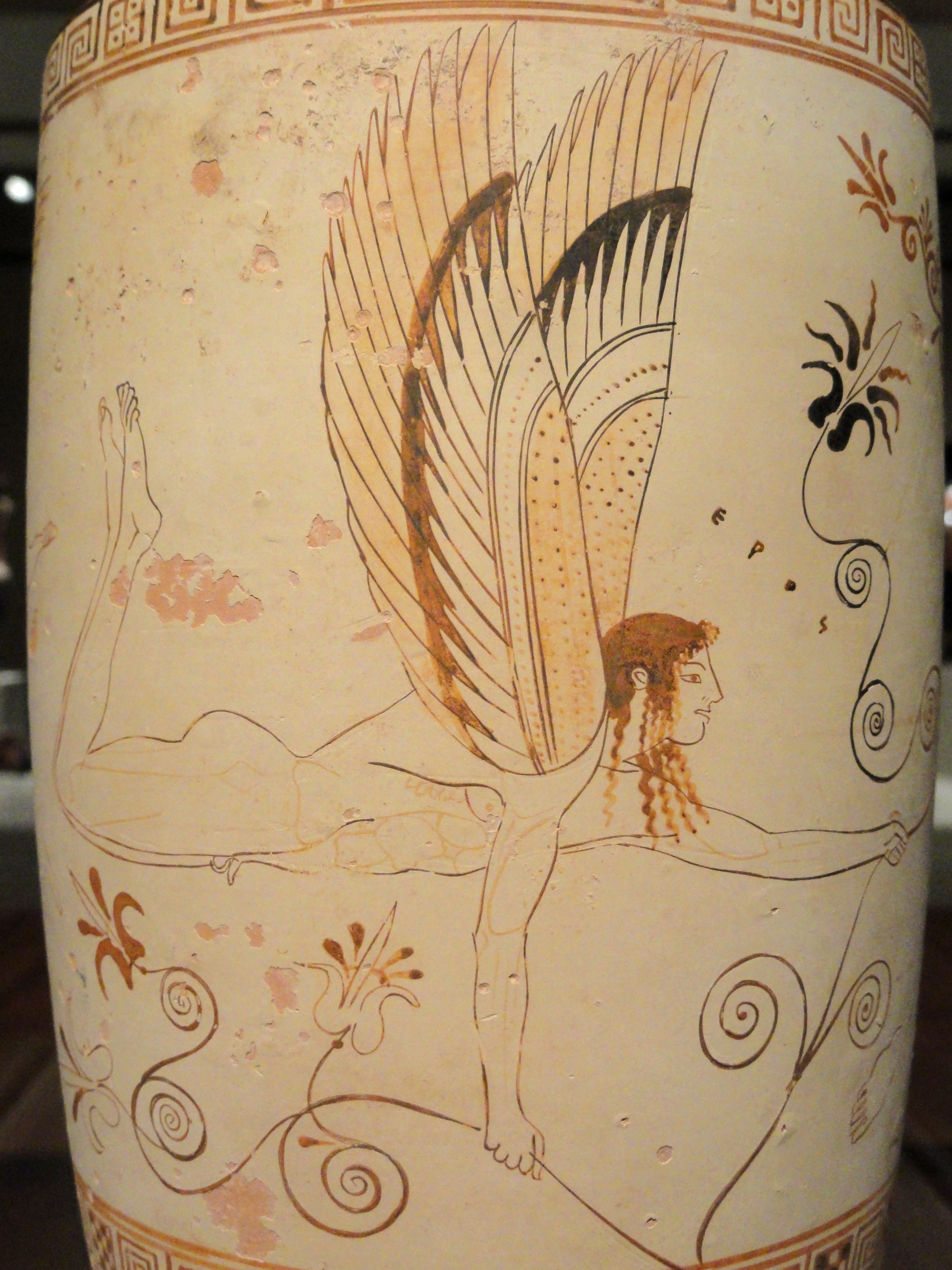
Eros

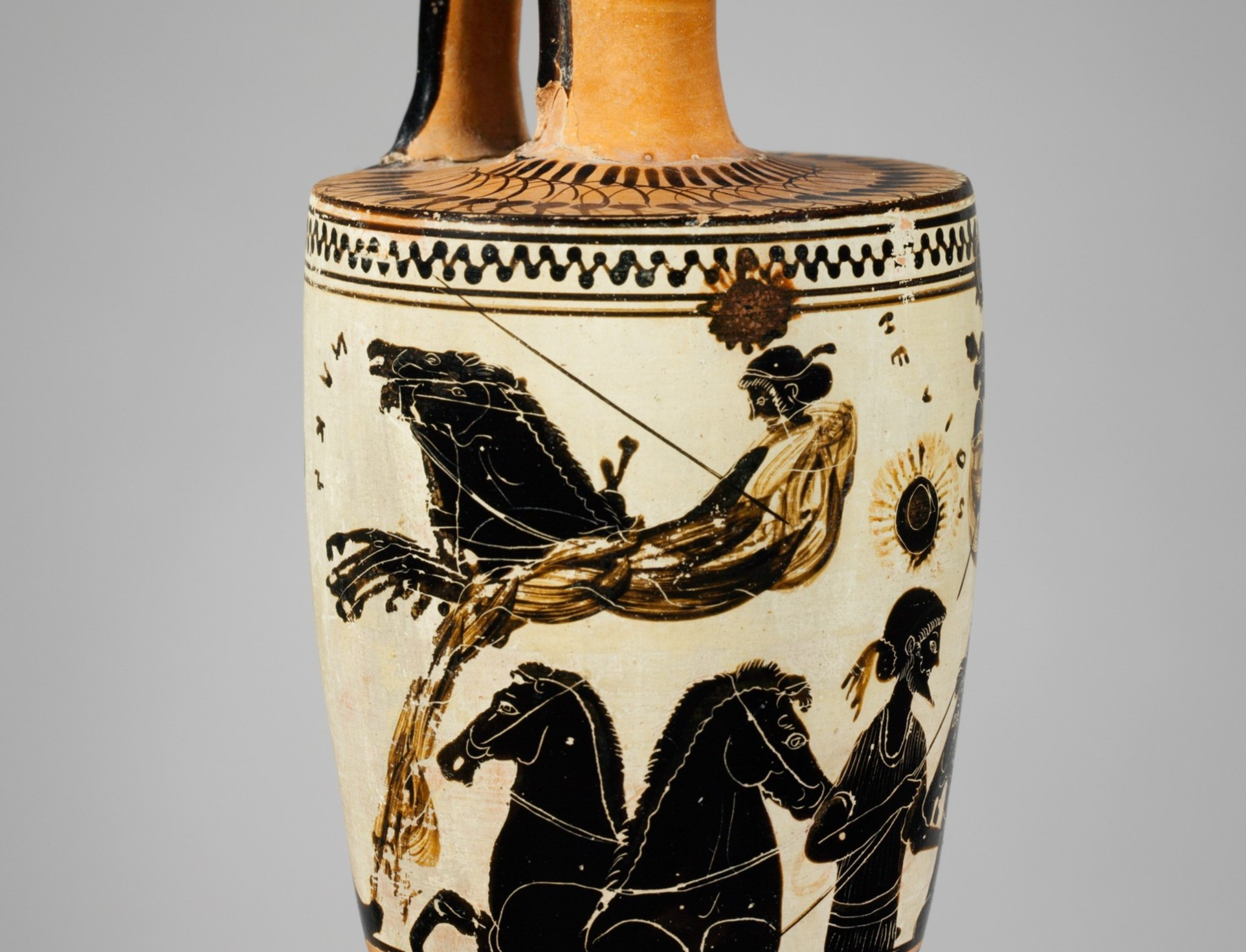
Nyx

List of the earliest figures in Hesiod's Theogony, with a description of each
Name	Description
Aether	The personification of the brightness present in the upper sky. In the Theogony, he is the offspring of Nyx and Erebus, and the brother of Hemera. He appears in a number of other early cosmogonies, and in an Orphic theogony he is produced by Chronos, alongside Chaos and Erebus.
Chaos	The first being to exist in Hesiod's Theogony. The word means 'yawning' or 'gap', though the location of Chaos, or what it sits between, is not specified. After Chaos there comes Gaia, Tartarus, and Eros, and from Chaos herself is born Erebus and Nyx.
Erebus	The personification of darkness. In the Theogony, he is the offspring of Chaos and the brother of Nyx, with whom he produces Aether and Hemera. In an Orphic theogony, he is produced by Chronos. The word Erebus is also used to refer to the underworld.
Eros	The god of love. He is typically considered the son of Aphrodite, though in the Theogony he is among the earliest beings to exist. In other cosmogonies, including some that are Orphic, he is similarly a primordial figure. Although absent from Homeric epic, lyric poets of the archaic era (c. 800–480 BC) present him as a representation of the subjective experience of love. He appears in Aphrodite's retinue alongside figures such as Himeros and Pothos. In Thespiai, he was venerated in the form of a stone, and in cult he typically appears alongside Aphrodite. The Romans referred to him as Cupid or Amor.
Gaia	See § Nature deities.
Hemera	The personification and goddess of the day. In the Theogony, she is the offspring of Nyx and Erebus, and the sister of Aether. Hemera and Eos are frequently identified in later works.
Nyx	The goddess and personification of the night. In the Theogony, she is the offspring of Chaos and the sister of Erebus, by whom she becomes the mother of Aether and Hemera. Without the help of a father, she gives rise to a brood of dismal personifications. She is said to live at the extremes of the earth or in the underworld, and to drive a horse-pulled chariot. In the Iliad, even Zeus fears to upset her. She figures prominently in early cosmogonies, and appears to have been the first deity in the oldest known Orphic theogonies. In the Orphic Rhapsodies, she is a ruler who supplants Phanes.
Tartarus	A region which sat far below the underworld, and its personification. In the Theogony, he is one of the first beings to come into existence, appearing after Gaia and prior to Eros. By Gaia, he becomes the father of the monstrous Typhon and (in later sources) of Echidna.

=== Descendants of Gaia and Uranus ===
Aside from the descendants of Chaos, all the remaining deities of Hesiod's poem genealogically originate from Gaia (or Earth). On her own, she produces several figures who represent parts of the physical world, including Uranus (or Sky) and Pontus (or Sea), both of whom subsequently mate with her. Together with Uranus, she sits at the head of the family which eventually produces the Olympians; the couple's children include the twelve Titans (listed under § The Titans and their descendants), the youngest of whom, Cronus, castrates his father. The resulting spilt blood and detached genitals lead in time to further offspring.

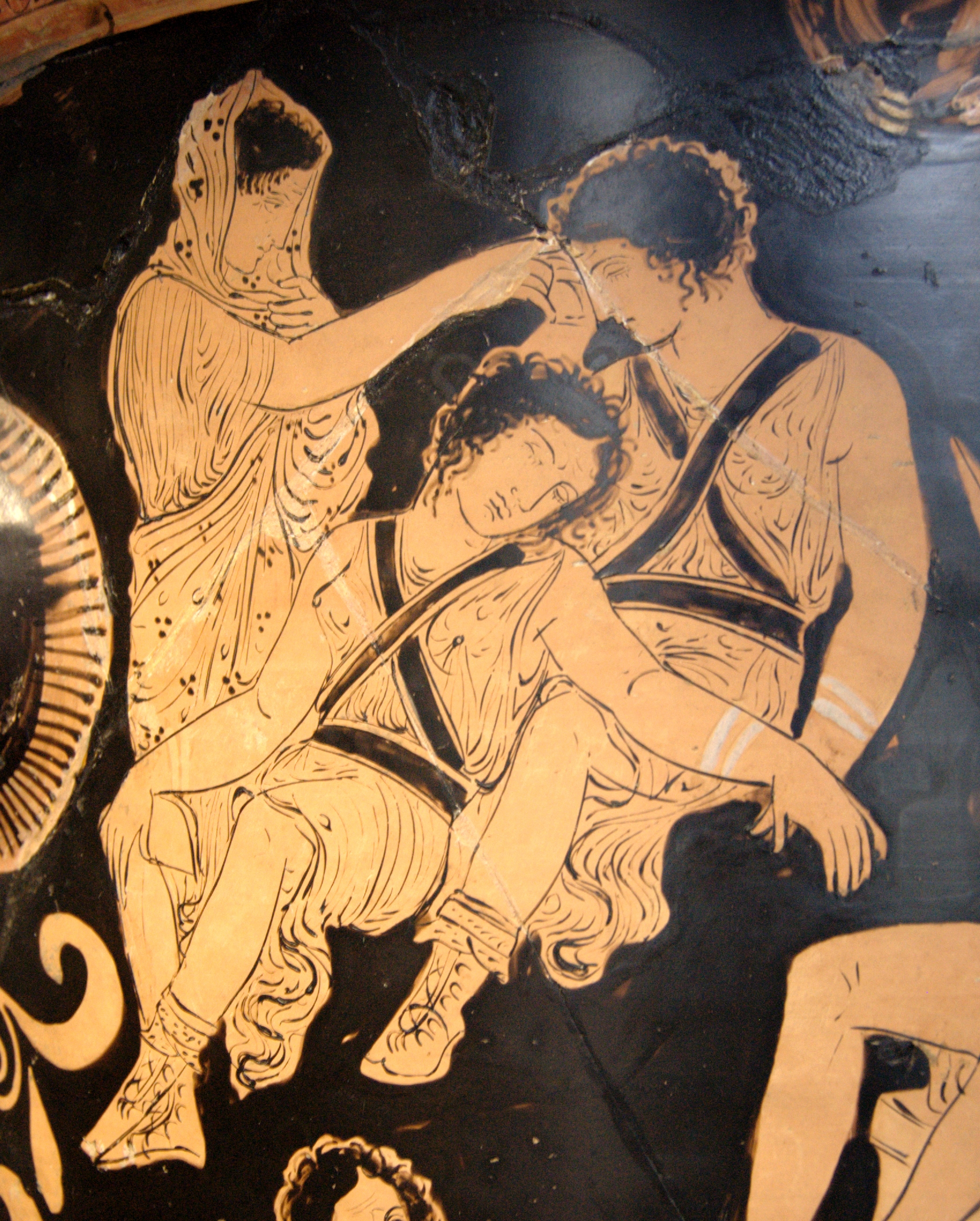
Erinyes

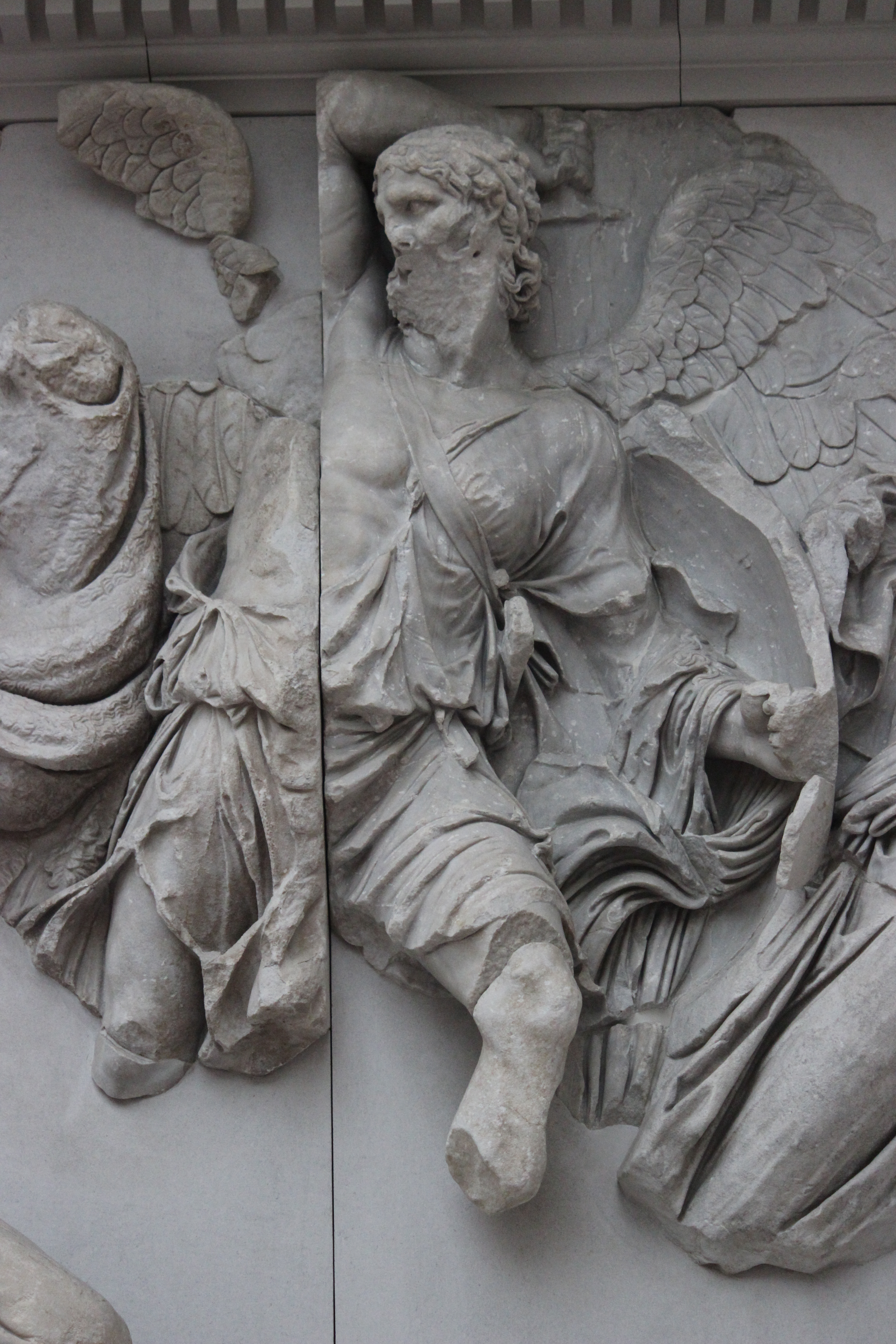
Uranus

List of a number of Gaia and Uranus's descendants, with a description of each
Name	Description
Aphrodite	See § Twelve Olympians.
Erinyes	Figures who punish those who commit serious offences, particularly against family members. Their names are Alecto, Megaera, and Tisiphone. In the Theogony, they are produced from blood spilt onto the earth when Uranus is castrated by his son, Cronus. Elsewhere, they are the offspring of Nyx. They are inhabitants of the underworld, and are capable of cursing mortals or driving them mad. Erinys (sing. of 'Erinyes') was assimilated to Demeter in Arcadia, and was considered the mother of Arion by Poseidon. The Roman counterparts of the Erinyes are the Furies.
Meliae	Considered by most scholars to be nymphs of ash trees. According to Hesiod, they are born from drops of blood spilt when Uranus's genitals are severed.
Ourea	The mountains. In the Theogony, they are produced by Gaia without the aid of a father.
Pontus	The personification of the sea. In the Theogony he is the offspring of Gaia, who produces him without a father. By Gaia, he fathers Eurybia, Nereus, Thaumas, Phorcys, and Ceto.
Uranus	The personification of the sky. He is the offspring of Gaia, who produces him without the help of a partner. By Gaia, he fathers the Titans, the Cyclopes, and the Hecatoncheires. He imprisons his offspring within the earth, leading his Titan son Cronus to castrate him. He hurls the severed genitals into the ocean, and the blood spilt onto the earth in time produces the Erinyes, Giants, and Meliae.

=== Descendants of Gaia and Pontus ===
The other lineage arising from Gaia is the family she produces with Pontus, which includes figures associated with the sea and an assortment of monsters.

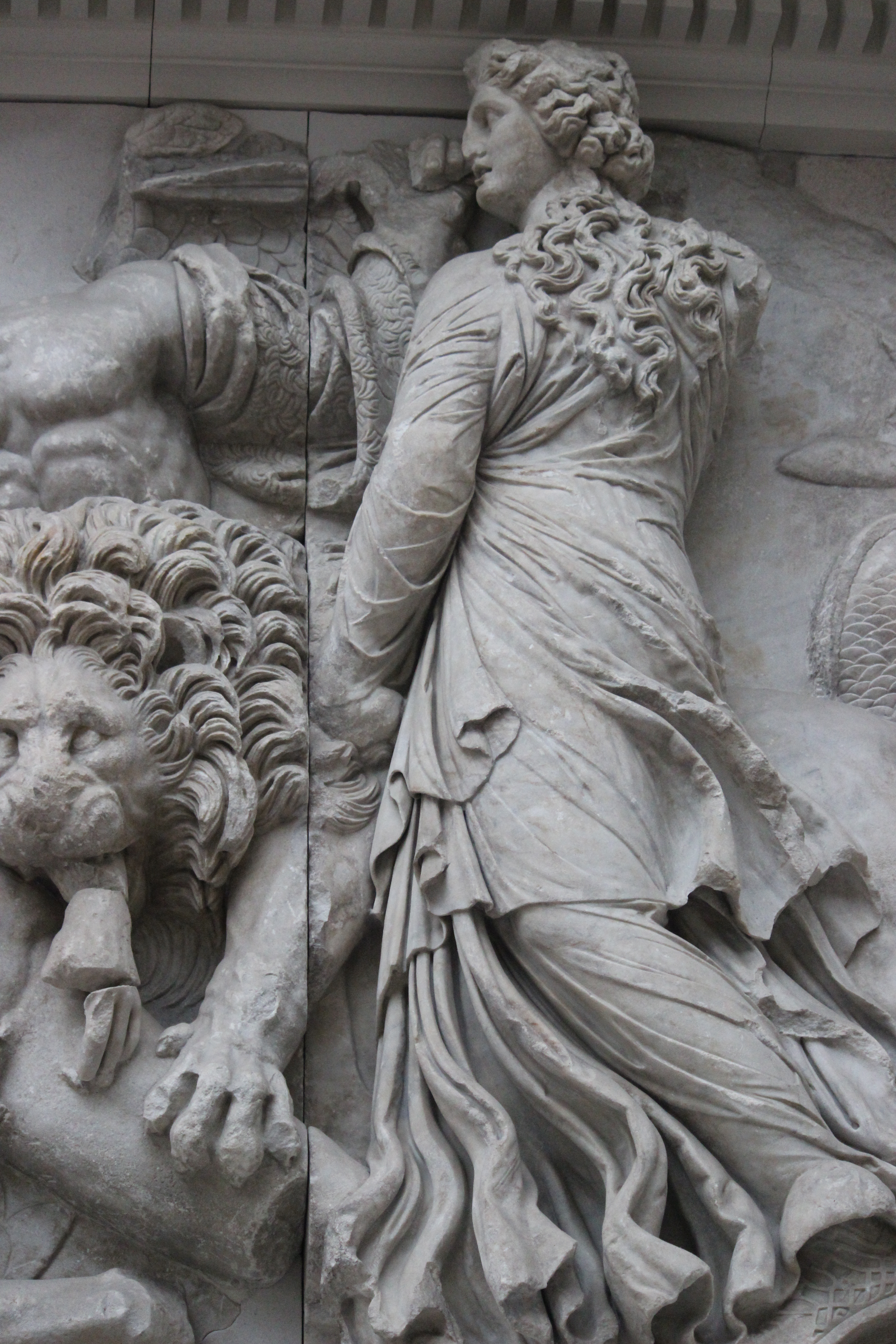
Ceto

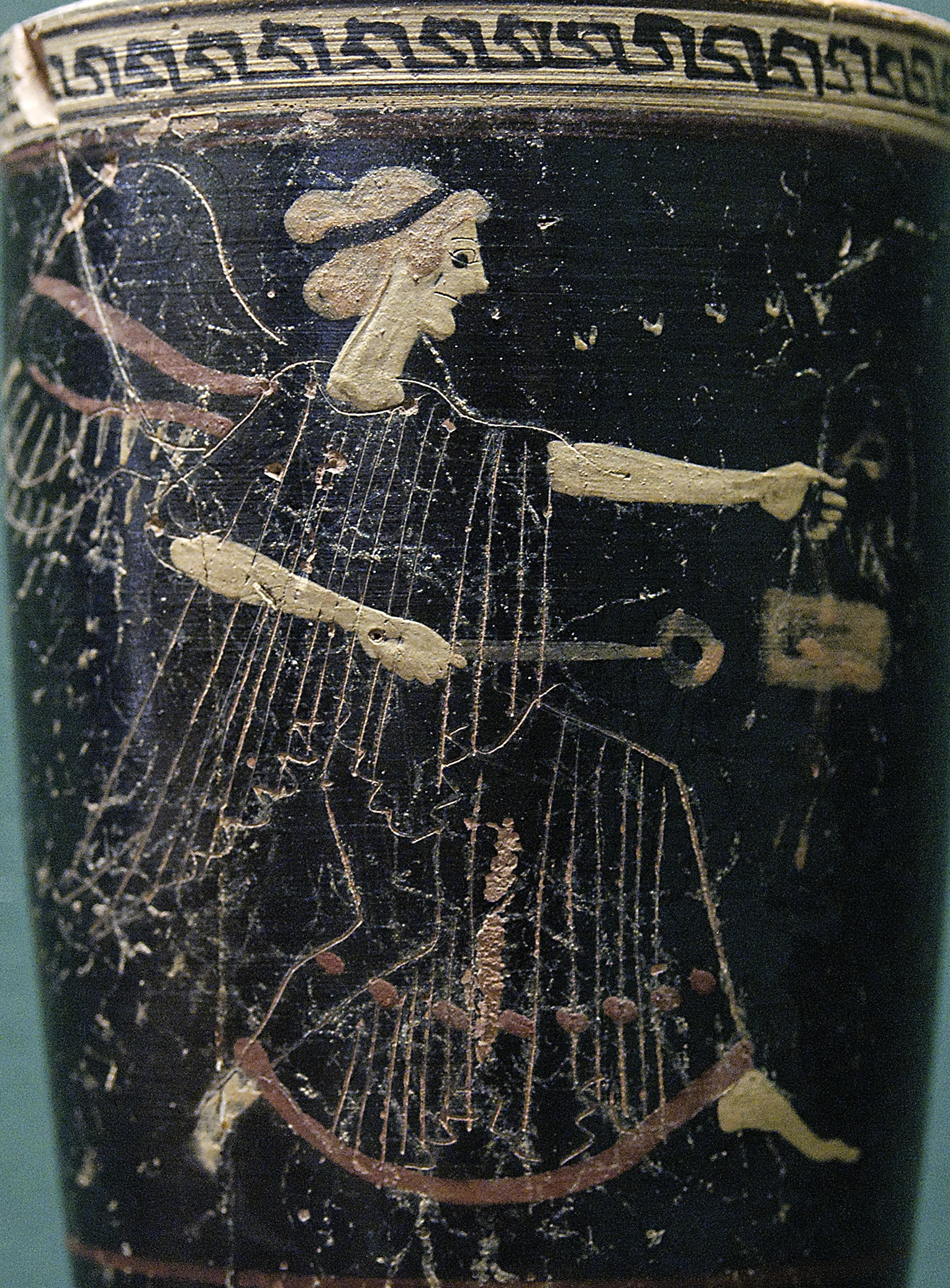
Iris

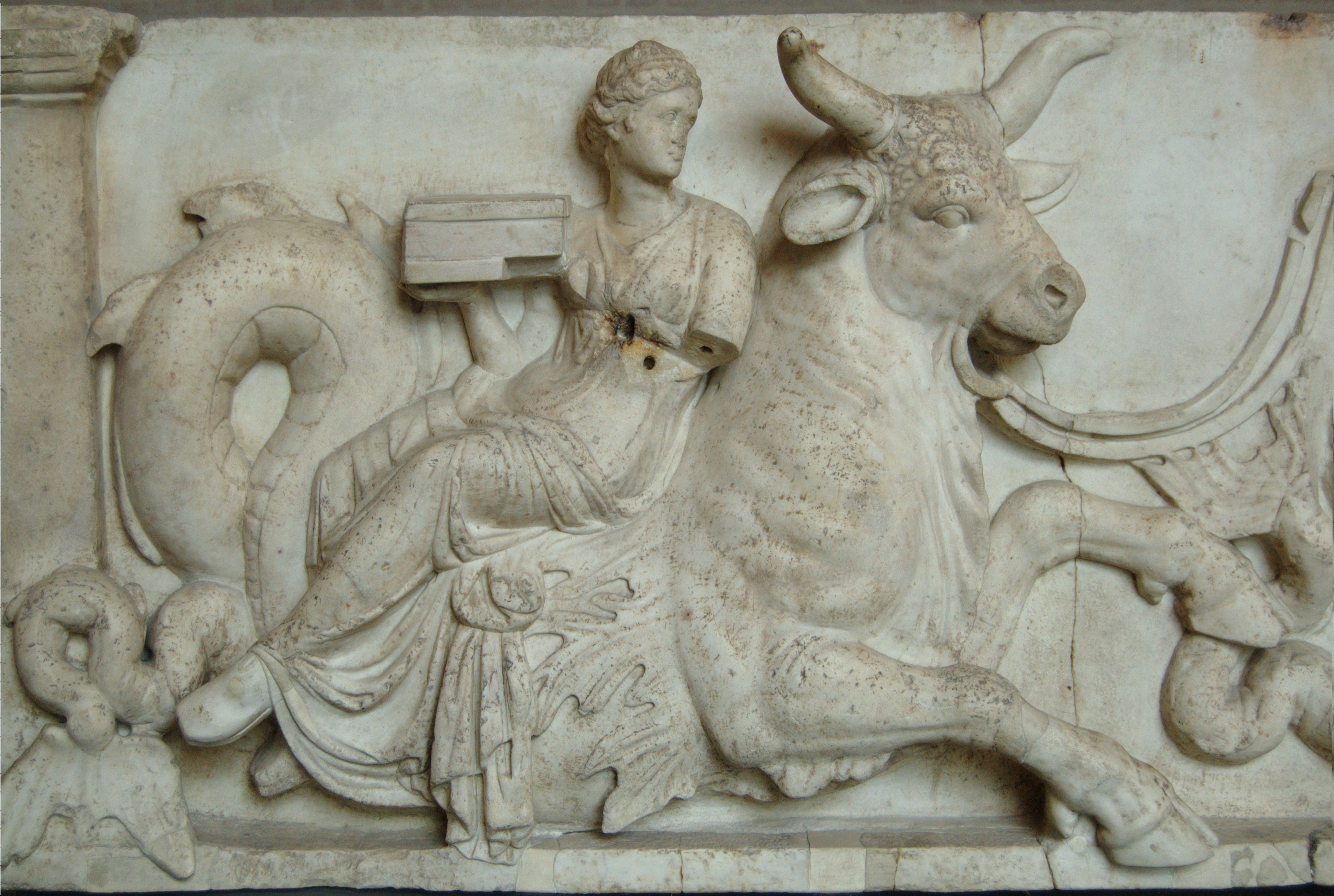
A Nereid

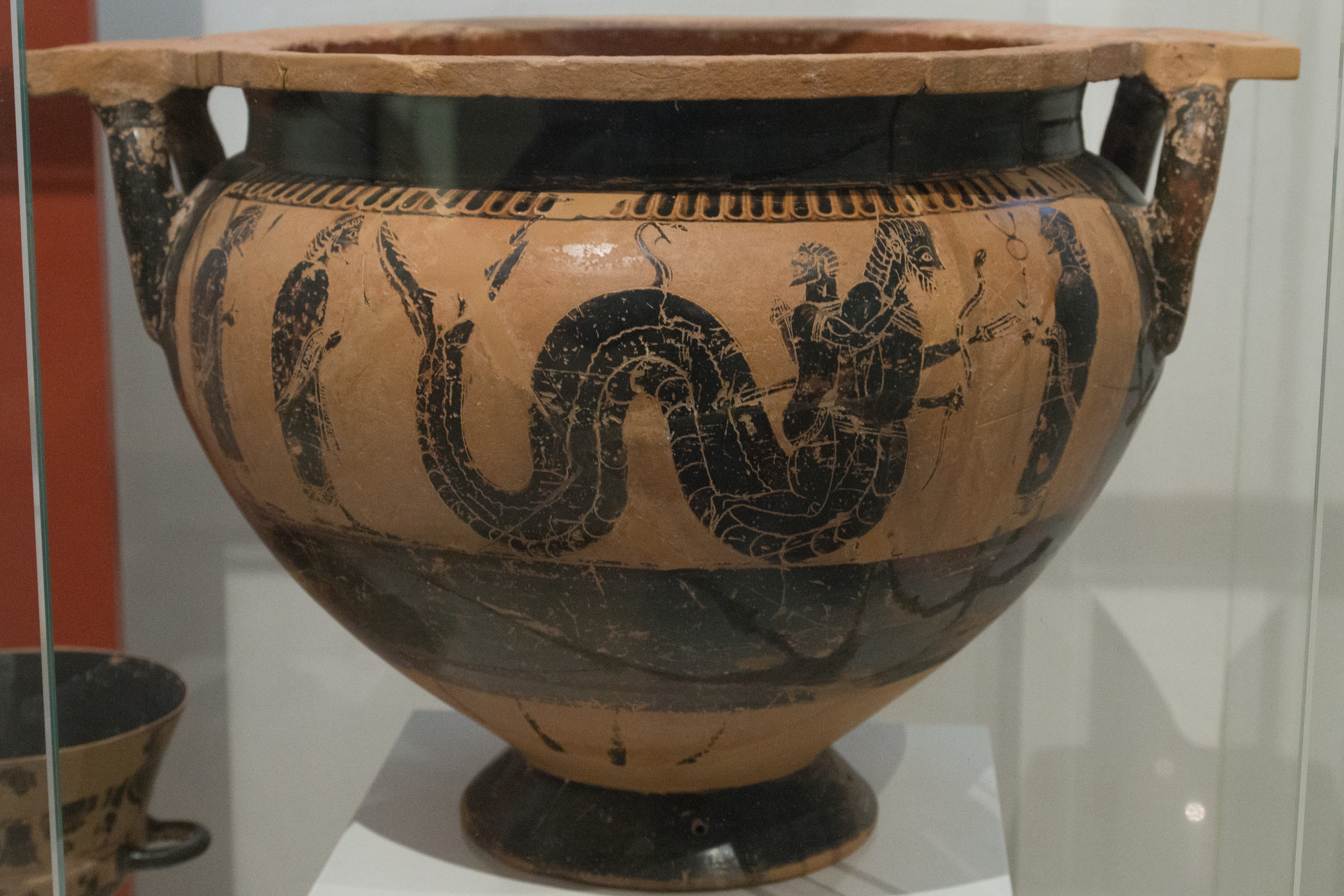
Nereus

List of Gaia and Pontus's descendants, with a description of each
Name	Description
Anemoi	See § Nature deities.
Astraeus	The son of Crius and Eurybia. He is the husband of Eos, by whom he becomes the father of the winds – Boreas, Zephyrus, and Notus – as well as the stars, including Eosphorus.
Ceto	The daughter of Gaia and Pontus. She is the wife of the sea god Phorcys, by whom she produces a brood of monstrous creatures, including the Gorgons, the Graeae, and Echidna.
Eosphorus	The morning star. He is one of the children of Eos and Astraeus, and his offspring (in different sources) include Stilbe, Philonis, and Leuconoe. His Roman counterpart is Lucifer.
Eurybia	The daughter of Gaia and Pontus. She is the wife of the Titan Crius, by whom she becomes the mother of Astraeus, Pallas, and Perses.
Hecate	See § Other major deities.
Iris	The messenger of the gods and personification of the rainbow. She is considered the daughter of Thaumas and Electra, and at times the wife of Zephyrus. In the Iliad, she is mostly dispatched as divine messenger by Zeus, though she also acts independently in some instances. In later works, she serves Hera. She sometimes transforms into another figure during a task, and her epithets in the Iliad emphasise her swiftness. In art, she commonly has wings and a staff, and often accompanies more important deities.
Nereus	A sea god, son of Gaia and Pontus. He is the husband of Doris, by whom he becomes the father of the fifty Nereids, who live with him beneath the sea. He is one of the deities referred to as an "Old Man of the Sea", and is described as having prophetic and shapeshifting abilities. He is said to battle the hero Heracles, changing himself into numerous forms during the struggle. This myth is represented in vase paintings; Nereus has the tail of a fish in the earliest depictions, and legs in later works.
Nereids	Sea nymphs, who are the fifty daughters of Nereus and Doris. Ancient authors give varying lists of Nereids, and only a handful – such as Thetis, Galatea, Amphitrite, and Psamathe – have any meaningful role in myth. They live with their father at the bottom of the sea, and were said to partake in song and dance. In art, they are often shown riding marine animals, accompanying a sea deity such as Poseidon. From the 4th century BC, they can be found partially or fully nude, and occasionally with fishtails.
Pallas	A Titan. In the Theogony, he is the husband of Styx and the father of Zelus, Nike, Kratos, and Bia. Elsewhere, Eos is given as his daughter.
Perses	The son of Crius and Eurybia. With Asteria, he produces the goddess Hecate. Hesiod states that he is exceptionally wise.
Phorcys	An early sea god. He is most often considered the offspring of Gaia and Pontus. His wife is Ceto, with whom he produces a series of monsters, including the Gorgons, the Graeae, and Echidna. In the Odyssey, he is the father of Thoosa and is referred to as an "Old Man of the Sea". The Sirens, the Hesperides, and Scylla are elsewhere given as his offspring.
Thaumas	The son of Gaia and Pontus. His wife is Electra, by whom he becomes the father of the goddess Iris and the Harpies.

=== The Titans and their descendants ===
The Titans, the twelve offspring of Uranus and Gaia, are the generation who come before the Olympians. The group consists of six members of each sex: four male-female pairs are married couples, with the remaining two male Titans marrying other goddesses, and the remaining two female Titans later coupling with Zeus. Many of the Titans' descendants relate to the physical world and its organisation. In sources after Hesiod, there is some disagreement as to the names of the twelve Titans, and there are several figures described as Titans beyond the original group of twelve.

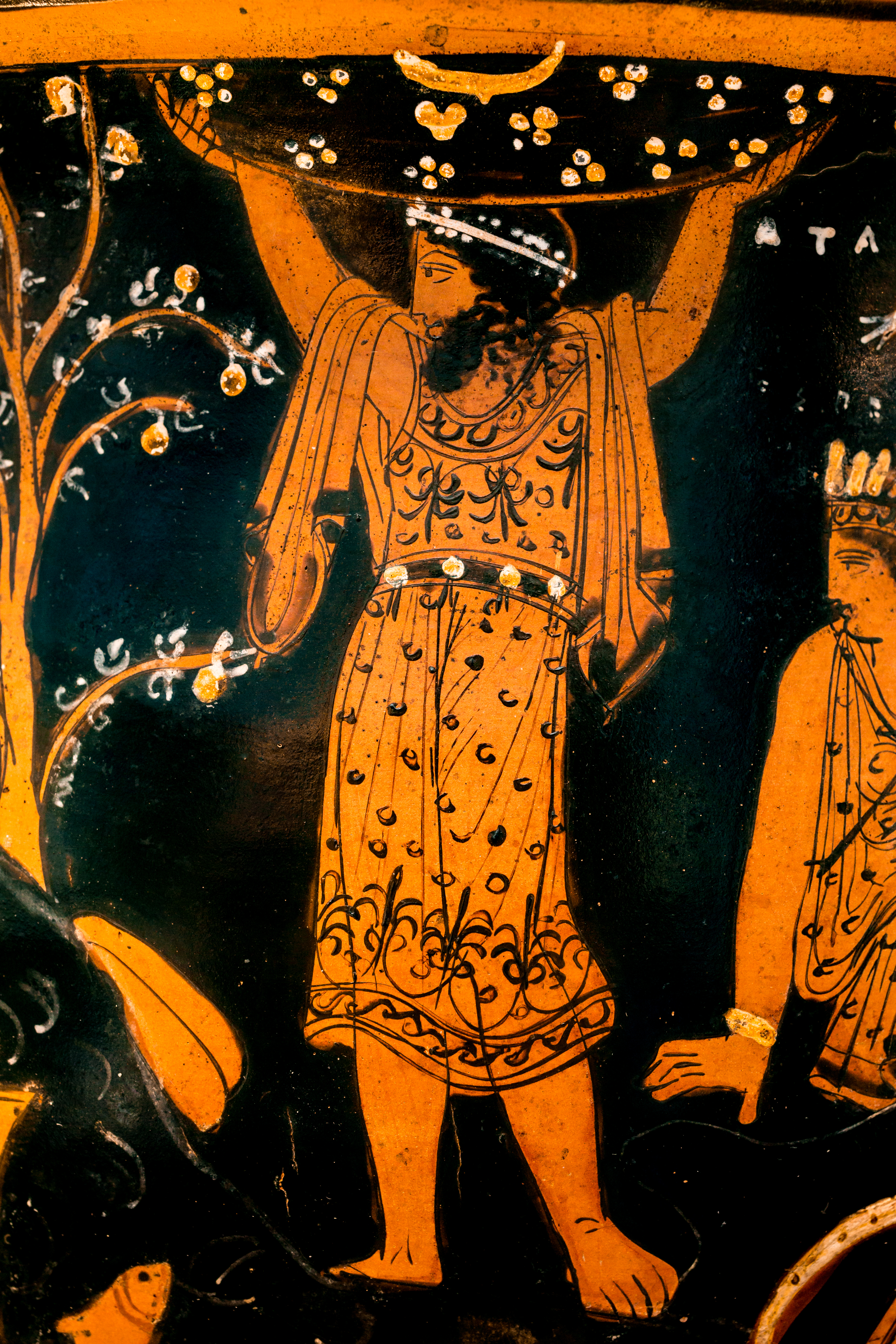
Atlas

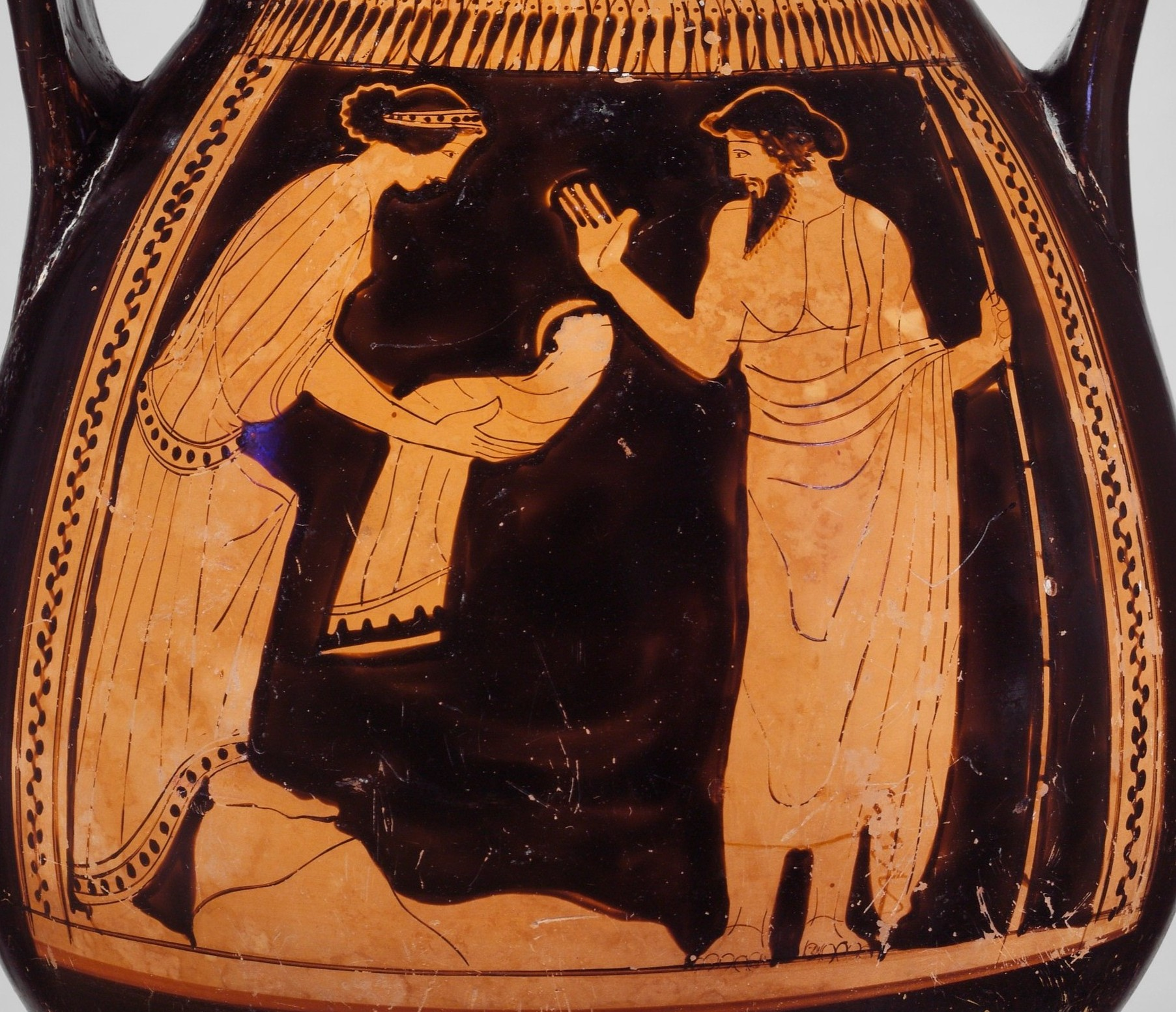
Cronus (right) and Rhea (left)

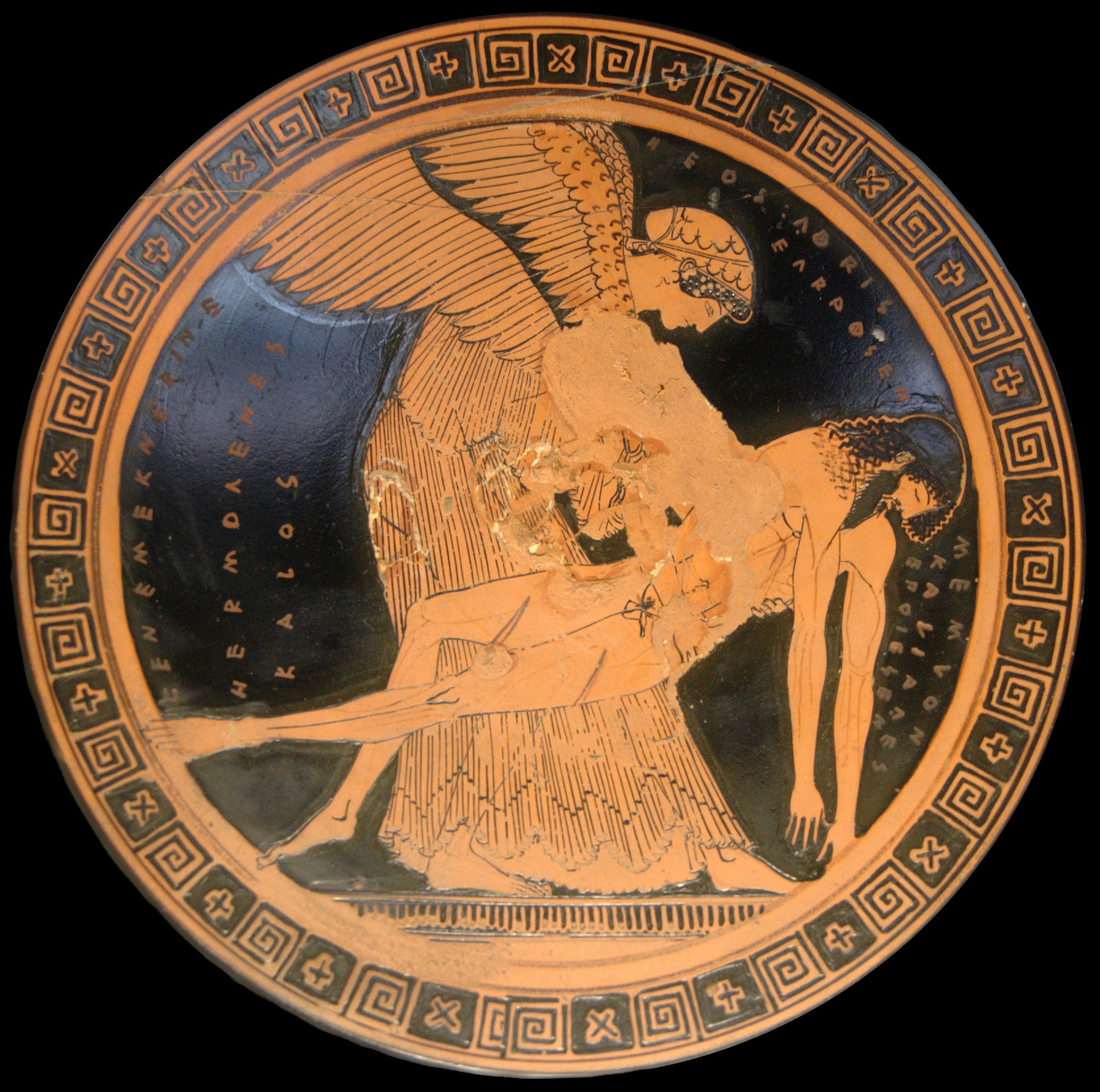
Eos (winged)

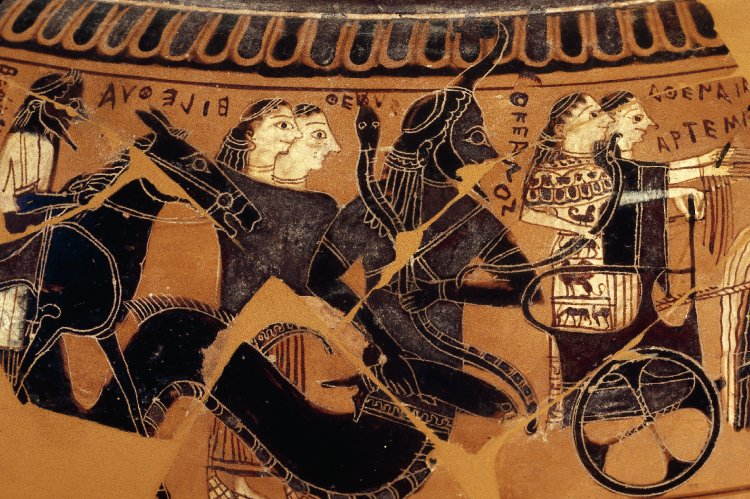
Oceanus (centre) and Tethys (immediately to his left)

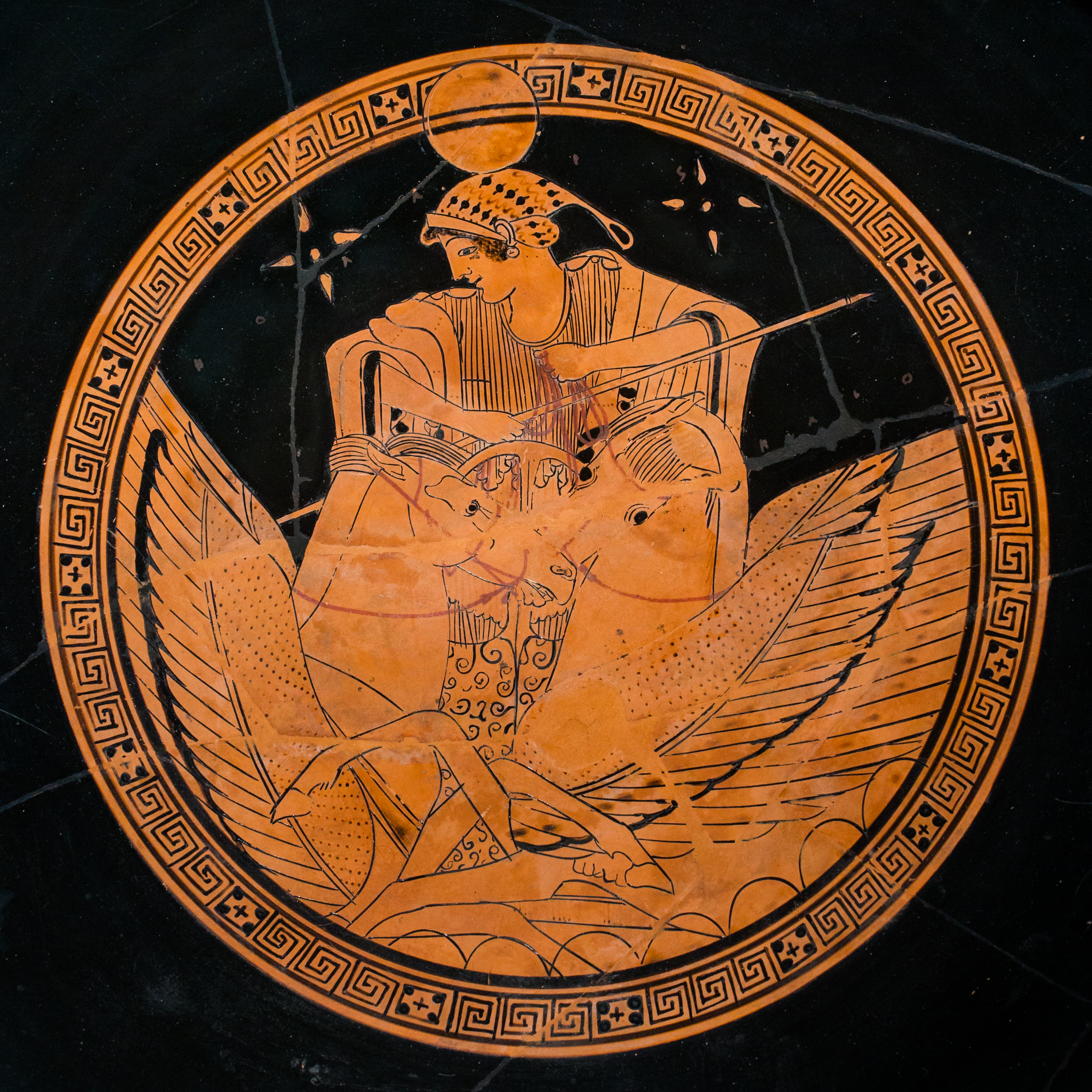
Selene

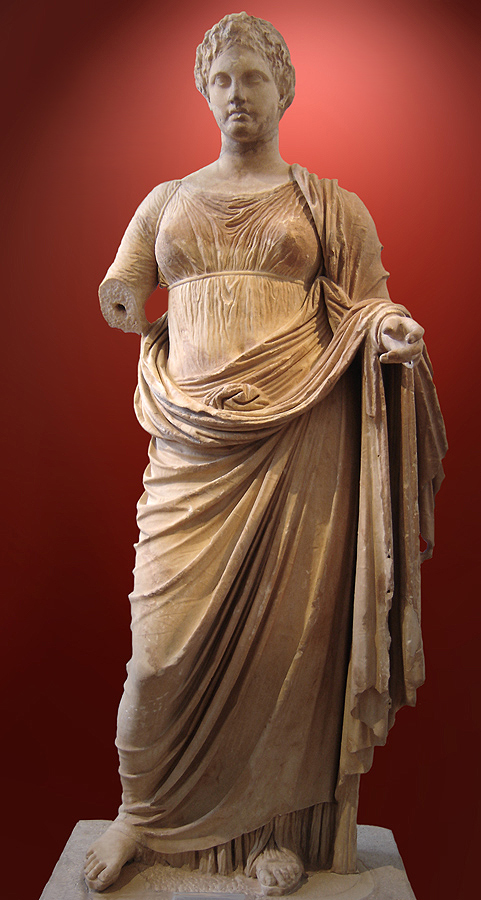
Themis

List of the Titans and their descendants, with a description of each
Name	Description
Asteria	The daughter of Coeus and Phoebe. In the Theogony, she marries Perses and the two produce Hecate. Zeus is said to chase her lustfully, resulting in her falling into the sea and being transformed into a quail. In the place where she lands rises an island, sometimes called Asteria, on which her sister Leto later gives birth.
Atlas	The offspring of the Titan Iapetus and an Oceanid, either Clymene or Asia. He is said to stand at the edge of the earth (in the far west or north) and hold up the sky. Early sources give no explicit reason as to why he has this burden, though later authors state it is because of his role in the Titanomachy. A story from the Metamorphoses tells that Perseus encounters Atlas and causes him to become a mountain using the severed head of Medusa. He is also said to be approached by Heracles, who tricks him and steals the golden apples from the nearby garden of the Hesperides.
Coeus	One of the Titans, the children of Uranus and Gaia. He marries Phoebe, with whom he produces Leto (the mother of Artemis and Apollo) and Asteria.
Crius	One of the Titans, the offspring of Uranus and Gaia. His wife is Eurybia, by whom he becomes the father of Astraeus, Pallas, and Perses.
Cronus	The youngest of the Titans, the offspring of Uranus and Gaia. He is chief among the Titans, and is ruler prior to Zeus. He is said to castrate his father with a sickle, overthrowing him, before becoming a tyrant. He swallows each child he has by his sister Rhea, until she hands him a stone to swallow in place of their final child, Zeus. Once grown, Zeus forces Cronus to disgorge his other children, who side with Zeus in a battle against the Titans, with Cronus and his siblings being defeated and banished to Tartarus. In Hesiod's Works and Days, Cronus's reign is contrastingly described as an idyllic age in which there lives a golden race of humans. He was honoured in the Kronia festival, which may have been associated with the harvest, and he possessed a temple in Olympia. His Roman counterpart is Saturn.
Dione	A consort of Zeus in some sources. In the Bibliotheca of Apollodorus, she is one of the Titans. Homer calls her the mother of Aphrodite (presumably by Zeus), and in the Theogony she is one of the Oceanids. She was possibly considered the wife of Zeus prior to Hera, who already occupied this role at some point in the Mycenaean era (c. 1750–1050 BC). Dione was venerated as his consort at the oracular site of Dodona, and the name Dione is a feminine version of Zeus (genitive: Dios).
Eos	The goddess of the dawn, and the daughter of Hyperion and Theia. With Astraeus, she produces the winds – Boreas, Zephyrus, and Notus – and the stars, including Eosphorus. She is said to drive a chariot up from the horizon at the beginning of each day. In myth, she steals away young mortal men with amorous intent, as in the stories of Tithonus, Orion, and Cleitus. In the first of these, she lives with Tithonus, who Zeus grants immortality (but not eternal youth), and the couple produce two children, Emathion and Memnon, before Tithonus slowly begins to deteriorate. She is found in art from the 6th century BC onwards, and is typically portrayed with wings.
Epimetheus	The son of Iapetus and either Clymene or Asia. His brother, Prometheus, cautions him to refuse all gifts from Zeus, but when the gods create Pandora, the first woman, and Zeus has her sent to the half-witted Epimetheus, he accepts her. The two are married, and as a result she is brought among humans, allowing her to unleash upon them evils from her jar.
Helios	See § Nature deities.
Hyperion	One of the Titans, the offspring of Uranus and Gaia. His consort is Theia, by whom he becomes the father of Helios, Selene, and Eos. He is frequently equated with Helios, and Homer uses "Hyperion" as an epithet of that god.
Iapetus	One of the Titan offspring of Uranus and Gaia. In the Iliad, he is mentioned as one of the Titans Zeus banishes to Tartarus. In Hesiod's Theogony, he is the father of Prometheus, Epimetheus, Atlas, and Menoetius, and the husband of Clymene, though other sources give his consort as Asia.
Leto	See § Other major deities.
Menoetius	The son of Iapetus and either Clymene or Asia. Zeus punishes his hubris by hitting him with lightning and hurling him down to Tartarus.
Metis	One of the Oceanids, offspring of Oceanus and Tethys. In the Theogony, she is the first goddess Zeus marries. When he hears that she is destined to bear a child who will overthrow him, he swallows her. Metis, pregnant with Athena, births her daughter inside Zeus, and Athena emerges from his head. Metis exists within him permanently, a position from which she provides him counsel. In Apollodorus's account, she aids Zeus against his father, Cronus, by delivering the latter an emetic, which frees Zeus's siblings from his father's stomach.
Mnemosyne	The personification of memory. She is one of the Titan daughters of Uranus and Gaia. In the Theogony she lies with Zeus for nine consecutive nights, resulting in the birth of the nine Muses. She had some existence in cult, often appearing alongside the Muses.
Oceanids	Ocean nymphs, the 3000 female offspring of Oceanus and Tethys. The forty-one oldest Oceanids are enumerated in the Theogony, and other lists are given in later works. They are said to be protectors of the young. Some of them feature in the retinue of Artemis, and others are mentioned as companions of Persephone before her abduction. Individual Oceanids include Styx, Doris, Metis, and Peitho.
Oceanus	The god of the river believed to encompass the earth and give rise to all other water bodies. He is one of the Titans, the offspring of Gaia and Uranus. His wife is Tethys, by whom he is the father of the 3000 Oceanids and the 3000 river gods. The Iliad possibly refers to him as the forefather of the gods. Various monsters and peoples are said to reside next to the river Oceanus, at the far extent of the world. Artistic depictions portray him as part human and part marine creature.
Phoebe	A female Titan, one of the offspring of Uranus and Gaia. Her husband is her brother Coeus, by whom she becomes the mother of Leto and Asteria, and thereby the grandparent of Apollo and Artemis. In some accounts, she is credited as the founder of the Delphic oracle, which she passes to Apollo.
Prometheus	See § Other major deities.
Rhea	One of the female Titans, daughters of Uranus and Gaia. She is the wife of Cronus and the mother of Hestia, Demeter, Hera, Hades, Poseidon, and Zeus. Her husband swallows each child upon their birth, until Rhea hides away their final child, Zeus, instead delivering Cronus a stone to consume. Once grown, Zeus wages war against Cronus, during which Rhea has Oceanus and Tethys look after Hera. As early as the 5th century BC, Rhea was identified with Cybele.
River gods	See § Nature deities.
Selene	The goddess and personification of the Moon. In the Theogony, she is the offspring of Hyperion and Theia. She is said to fall for the beautiful Endymion, to whom she grants eternal sleep and with whom she produces fifty daughters. She also has an affair with Pan, and births Pandia and Ersa to Zeus. She is found in art as early as the 5th century BC, depicted with wings, flying her horse-pulled (or later oxen-pulled) chariot through the sky.
Styx	The goddess of the river Styx, the main river of the underworld. She is the oldest of the Oceanids, the daughters of Oceanus and Tethys, and is the wife of Pallas, with whom she produces Zelus, Nike, Kratos, and Bia. She aids Zeus and the younger gods in the Titanomachy, for which Zeus makes swearing upon her waters the highest oath of the gods. She is said to reside in the underworld.
Tethys	One of the Titans, the offspring of Uranus and Gaia. She is the wife of her brother Oceanus, by whom she becomes the mother of the 3000 river gods and 3000 Oceanids. In the Iliad, she and her husband may be referred to as the progenitors of the gods. During Zeus's battle against the Titans, Hera is sent to stay with Oceanus and Tethys at the far extremes of the earth. The couple, who have become alienated, are brought together again by Hera.
Theia	One of the female Titans, offspring of Uranus and Gaia. She is the wife of Hyperion, by whom she becomes the mother of Helios, Selene, and Eos.
Themis	One of the Titans, a daughter of Uranus and Gaia. Hesiod names her as the second goddess married by Zeus, with their union producing the three Horae and three Moirai. She is the goddess who presides over "sacred ancient law", and she provides counsel to Zeus. Aeschylus names her as the mother of Prometheus and equates her with Gaia. She possesses the power of prophecy, and delivers oracles (including that which stops Zeus from wedding Thetis). She is also said to be an owner of the Delphic oracle prior to Apollo. She was worshipped in a number of locations, including at Rhamnous, where she was venerated in conjunction with Nemesis.

== Groups of divinities and nature spirits ==
The following section is based upon the chapter "6. Lesser deities and nature-spirits" in Robin Hard's Routledge Handbook of Greek Mythology (2004), and the section "Minor Divinities" in Timothy Gantz's Early Greek Myth: A Guide to Literary and Artistic Sources (1993). (Note: Hard, pp. 204–224; Gantz, pp. 135–151. The figures listed here are all those discussed by either Hard or Gantz in the relevant sections, with the exception of individual deities, who are excluded.)

Among the various minor deities are divine groups such as the Muses and the Horae. These sorts of divinities are referred to under a collective name, and appear in one another's company. The members of these groups, who are sometimes individually named, are consistently of one sex and are around the same age, though their number often differs by source, as do their names. These divinities often feature in the retinues of major gods, or are otherwise said to accompany such deities; the satyrs and maenads, for example, are among the companions of Dionysus, and the dancing Kouretes surround the infant Zeus. In some cases, these divine groups reflect the existence of real-world religious associations.

Nature spirits, such as the nymphs and satyrs, are inhabitants of different parts of the landscape, and fall somewhere between gods and humans. In antiquity, for example, there was disagreement as to the mortality of nymphs (who were sometimes described as goddesses), though it was seen as evident that they lived long enough to be virtually immortal by human standards. Similarly, whether or not satyrs were immortal seems to have been uncertain in ancient times.

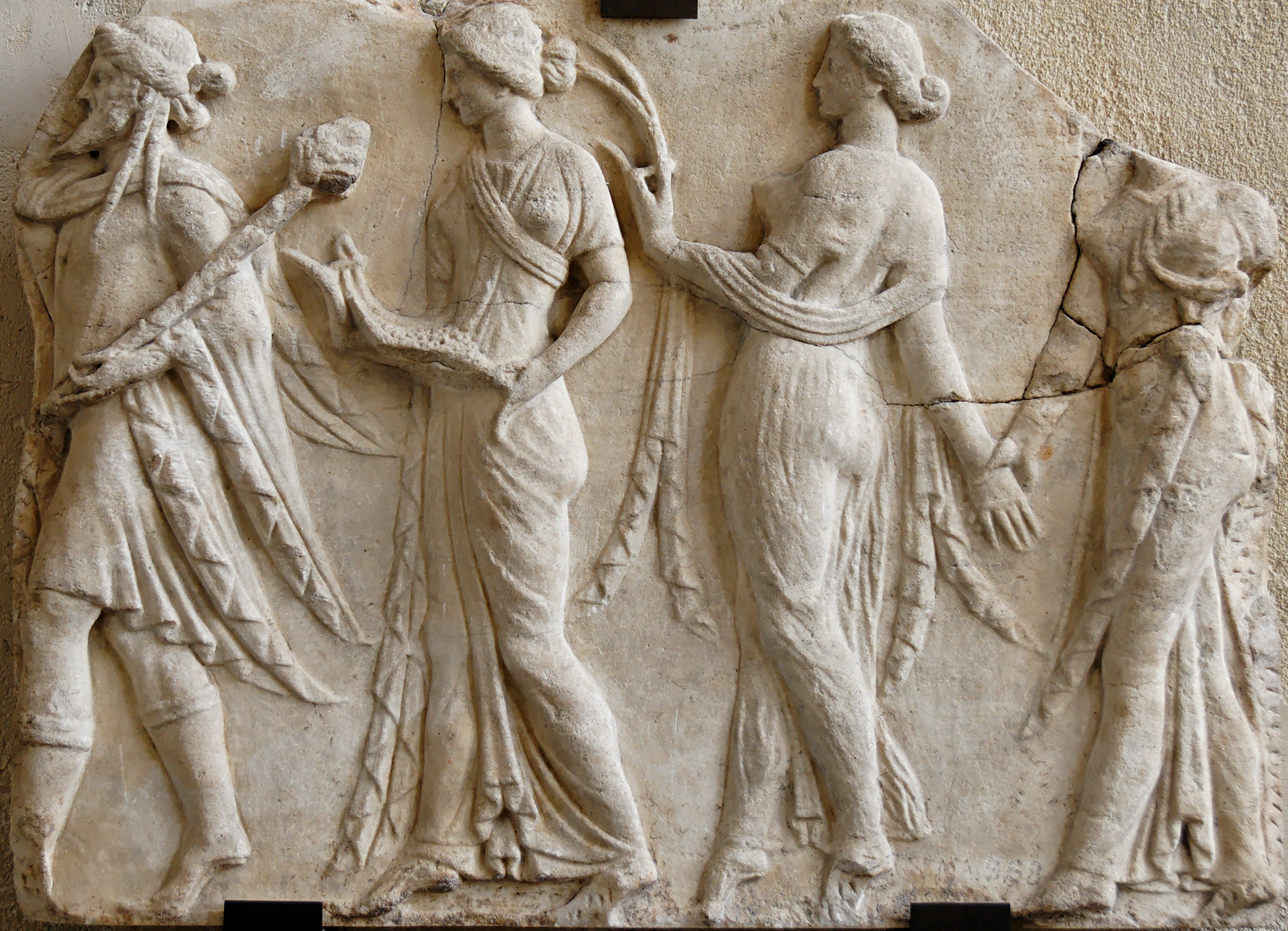
The three Horae (centre and right)

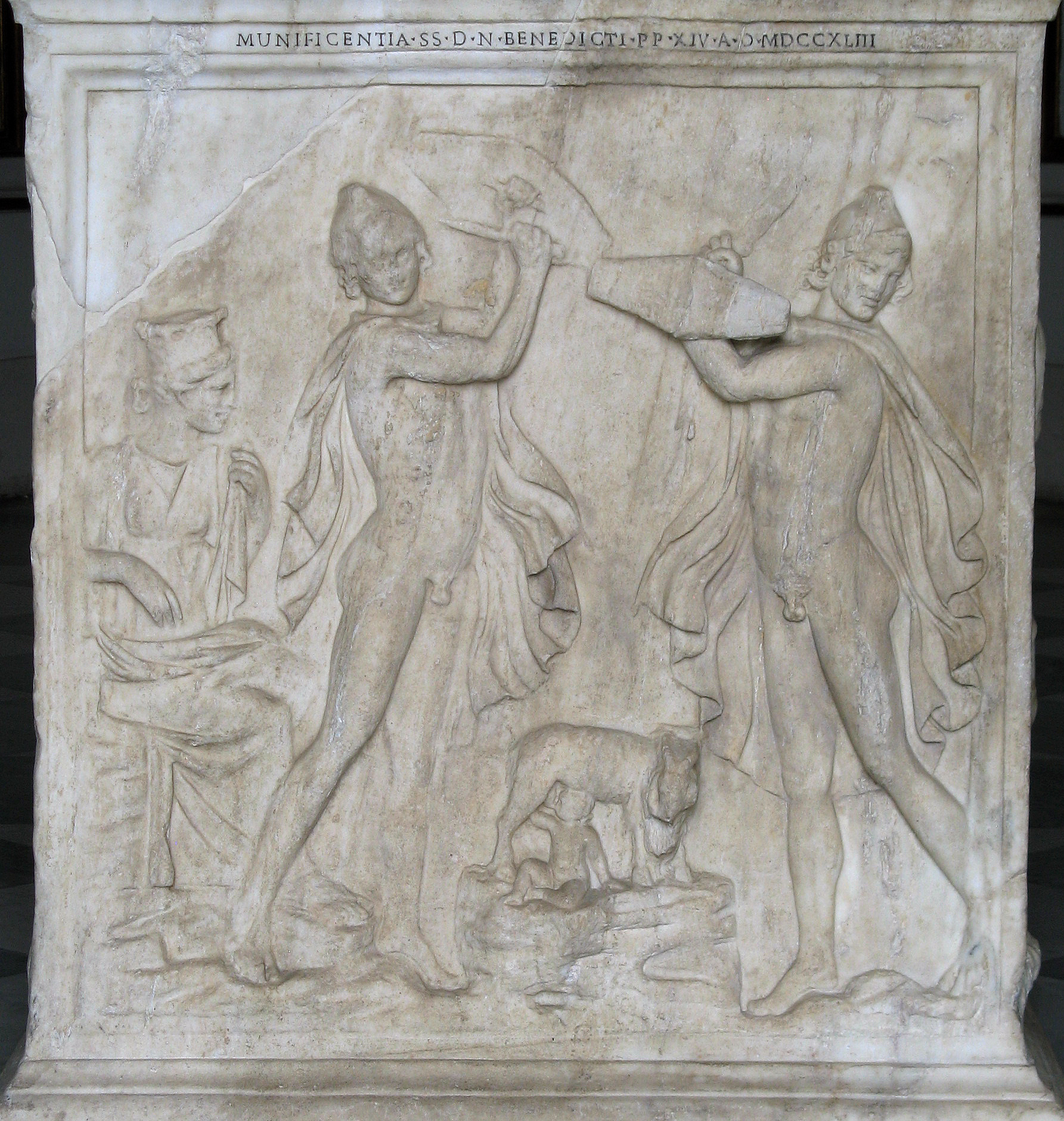
Two Kouretes

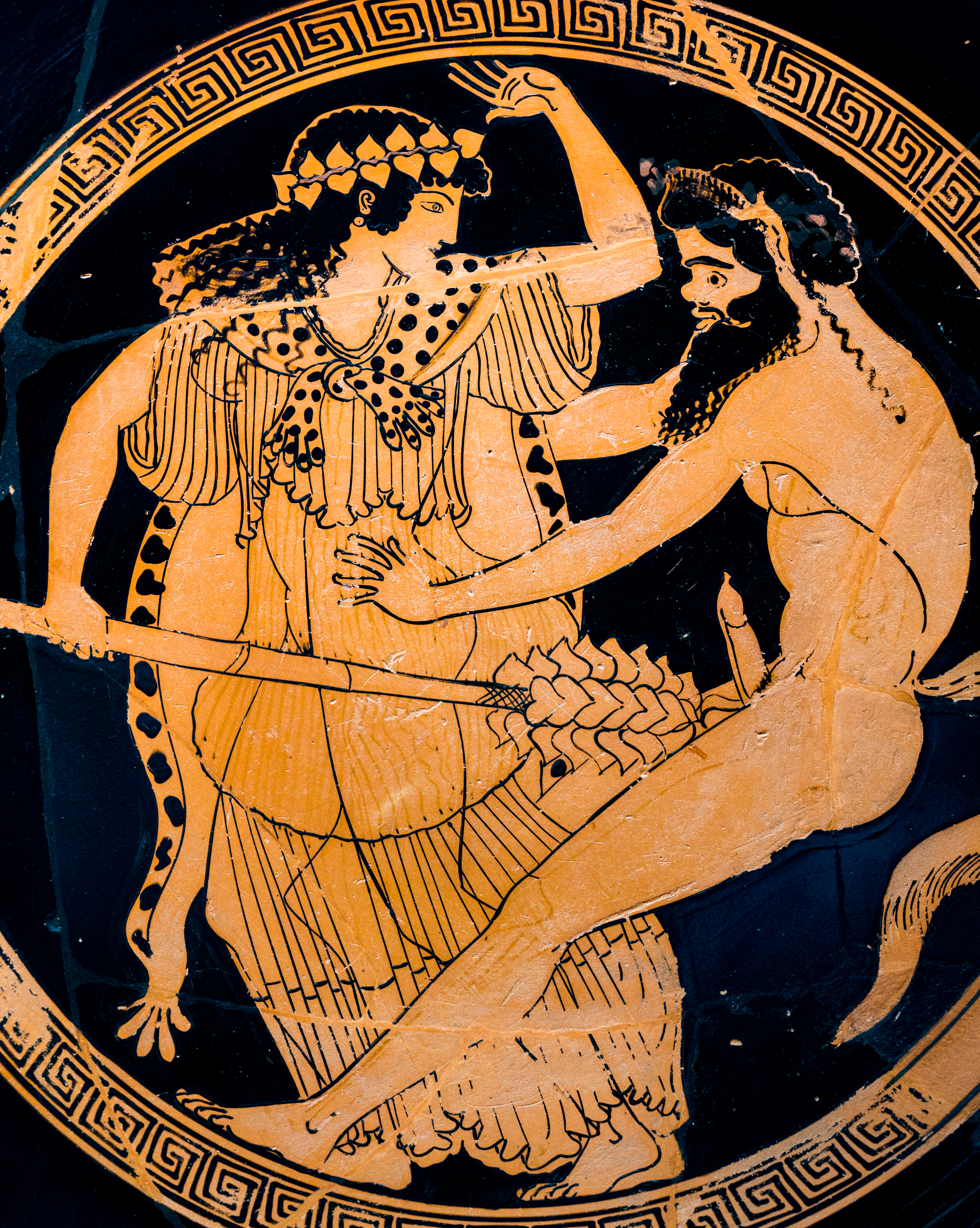
A maenad (left) and satyr (right)

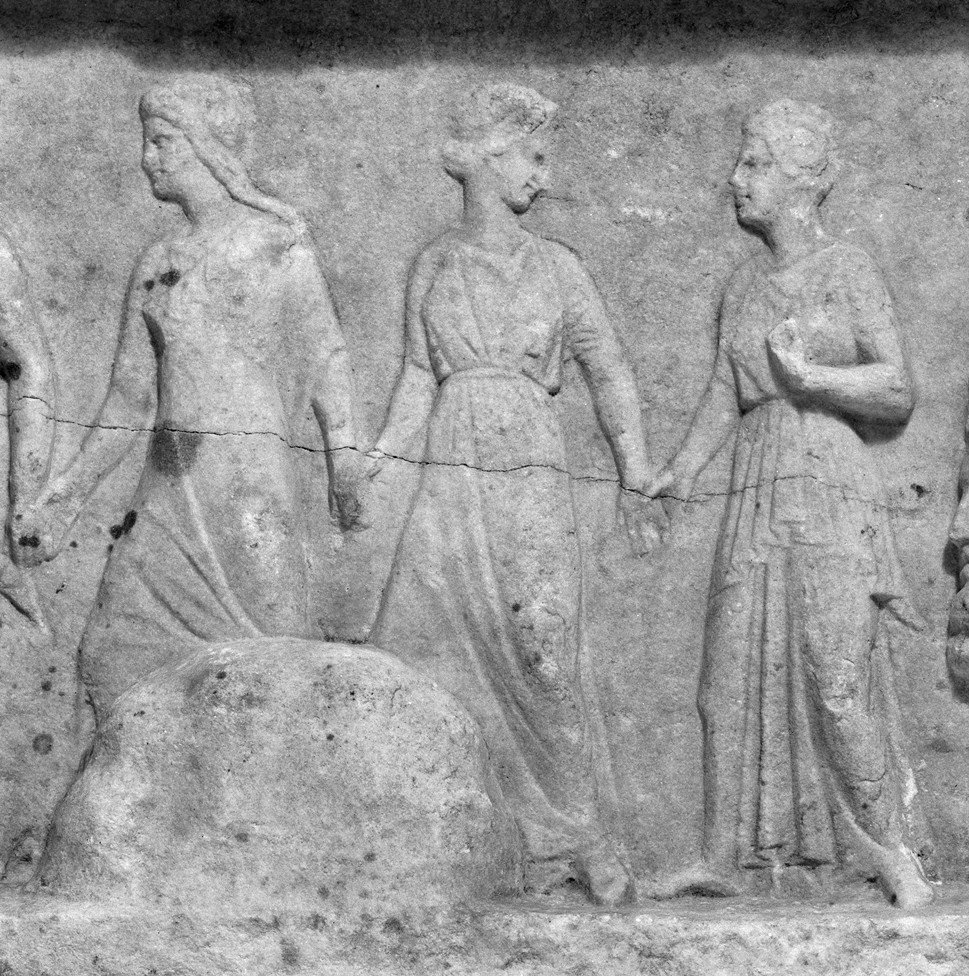
Three nymphs

List of groups of divinities and nature spirits, with a description of each
Name	Description
Cabeiri	See § Other major deities.
Charites	See § Other major deities.
Dactyls	Figures described as companions of Rhea (or at times Cybele). Their name translates as 'fingers'. In the Phoronis they are threefold, are companions of Adrasteia, and originate from Ida. Elsewhere they are more numerous, with some sources giving them as ten or one hundred in number. They are sometimes described as metalworkers or magicians, and can be found, equated with the Kouretes, as protectors of the young Zeus.
Horae	The Seasons, daughters of Zeus and Themis. They are three or four in number, and Hesiod names them as Eunomia, Dike, and Eirene. In Athens, they are called Thallo, Auxo, and Carpo. They are connected with plant life and with order, and Homer states that they stand guard outside the entrance to Olympus. They had a sanctuary in Attica, and there is evidence of their worship elsewhere. In art, they often cannot be told apart from the nymphs and Charites.
Korybantes	Figures who accompany Cybele. They were commonly equated with the Kouretes, and are similarly described as dancers who clang their spears upon their shields. They are ascribed numerous parentages in different sources, with Apollo or Rhea frequently being named as one of their parents.
Kouretes	Figures who protect the young Zeus by producing a din with their spears and shields, so that the child's crying cannot be heard by his father, Cronus. Some writers give their number as two or nine. The location in which they protect Zeus is usually given as Mount Dicte on Crete, though sometimes it is Mount Ida. A fragment of Hesiod calls them offspring of the daughters of Dorus. Their cult was spread across Crete, and existed in locations such as Olympia, Ephesus, Messenia, and the island of Thera (an early location of worship). They were often conflated with the Korybantes.
Maenads	Female figures in the retinue of Dionysus who follow him in his travels. Artistic depictions portray them as nude or thinly clothed women, holding thyrsi (staffs topped with ivy), kantharoi (a type of drinking vessel), or musical instruments such as flutes or tambourines. The nymphs who nurse the young Dionsyus are said to be the first Maenads. The term also refers to the historical women who took inspiration from the mythical Maenads.
Muses	See § Other major deities.
Nymphs	Female divinities connected with nature, conceived of as human women. There are types of nymphs: some are connected to certain habitats – such as the dryads (tree nymphs), Oreads (mountain nymphs), or Meliae (ash tree nymphs) – and others are of a specific parentage, such as the Nereids (daughters of Nereus) or Oceanids (daughters of Oceanus). In the Homeric epics, they are called daughters of Zeus. They are typically found in groups, and are frequently included as part of a nature-dwelling god's retinue. Their cult is attested by the time of Homer (c. 750–700 BC), and their worship was linked with caves and with the river gods. The term was sometimes used more generally to refer to young women.
Satyrs	Male figures who live in the wilderness. They are first attested around the start of the 6th century BC, and are among the figures in Dionysus's retinue. They are depicted as part human and part animal, ithyphallic, and tailed. Although early representations depict them with horse-like features, they gradually come closer to humans, before developing more goat-like traits in the Hellenistic era (c. 323–30 BC). They are generally shown as nude, bald, and snub-nosed, with their equine features extending to their ears, their tail, and (less often) their feet. Their first literary mention is a fragment of Hesiod, which calls them offspring of the daughters of Dorus, as well as "worthless" and "good-for-nothing". In myth, they are often found lusting after nymphs. Their Roman counterparts are the fauns.
Silenoi	Companions of Dionysus who live in the wild. They are first mentioned in the Homeric Hymn to Aphrodite, where they are said to be sexual partners of the mountain nymphs. In art, they seem to be identical in appearance to the satyrs; they are perhaps the same figures as the satyrs, though they may have initially been separate.
Telchines	Magical figures from the island of Rhodes. They are said to be the original inhabitants of a number of islands in the Aegean Sea. They are magicians and shapeshifters, and in art are portrayed as amphibious creatures who are part fish or part snake. They are sometimes said to invent metalworking, and different authors credit them with the creation of objects such as the trident of Poseidon or the sickle of Cronus.
Thriae	Three prophetesses who are the offspring of Zeus. They are nymphs belonging to Mount Parnassus, and are said to be among the first to practice divination, doing so through the use of pebbles.

== Abstract personifications ==
Note that personifications of abstract concepts listed in previous sections (such as Nyx, Erebus, and Hemera) are excluded here.

The Greeks often personified abstract concepts and represented them as deities; these concepts ranged from emotions such as love and fear, to forces such as persuasion, luck, and longing, to states such as night, victory, and death. The sex of the resulting deity was dictated by the gender of the personified noun. Such personifications are first attested in Greece in the 8th century BC, with the emergence of epic poetry. They sometimes appear in the retinues of major gods; for example, Eros and Himeros are companions of Aphrodite. They commonly feature in cosmogonies, where these concepts are genealogically linked to one another; for example, in the Theogony, the progeny of Nyx (Night) includes figures such as Thanatos (Death), Hypnos (Sleep), and Eris (Strife).

Although personifications originated in poetry, some who were more developed in literature were also represented in art. The earliest known artistic depiction of personifications is the Chest of Cypselus (c. 600 BC), which was followed in the late 6th century BC by vase paintings. Various personifications from epic poetry later developed cults, the earliest of which are attested in the 6th century BC; by the 4th century BC, there was worship of personifications who had no connection to the epic tradition. Only two personifications, Nemesis and Themis, are known to have been the dedicatees of a sanctuary, which was located in Rhamnous.

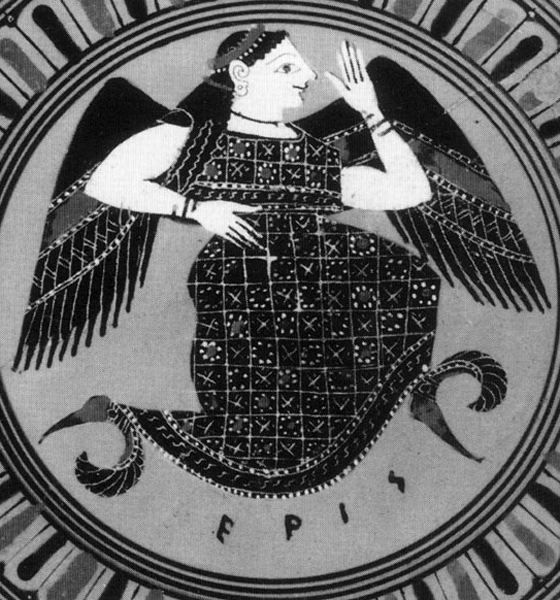
Eris

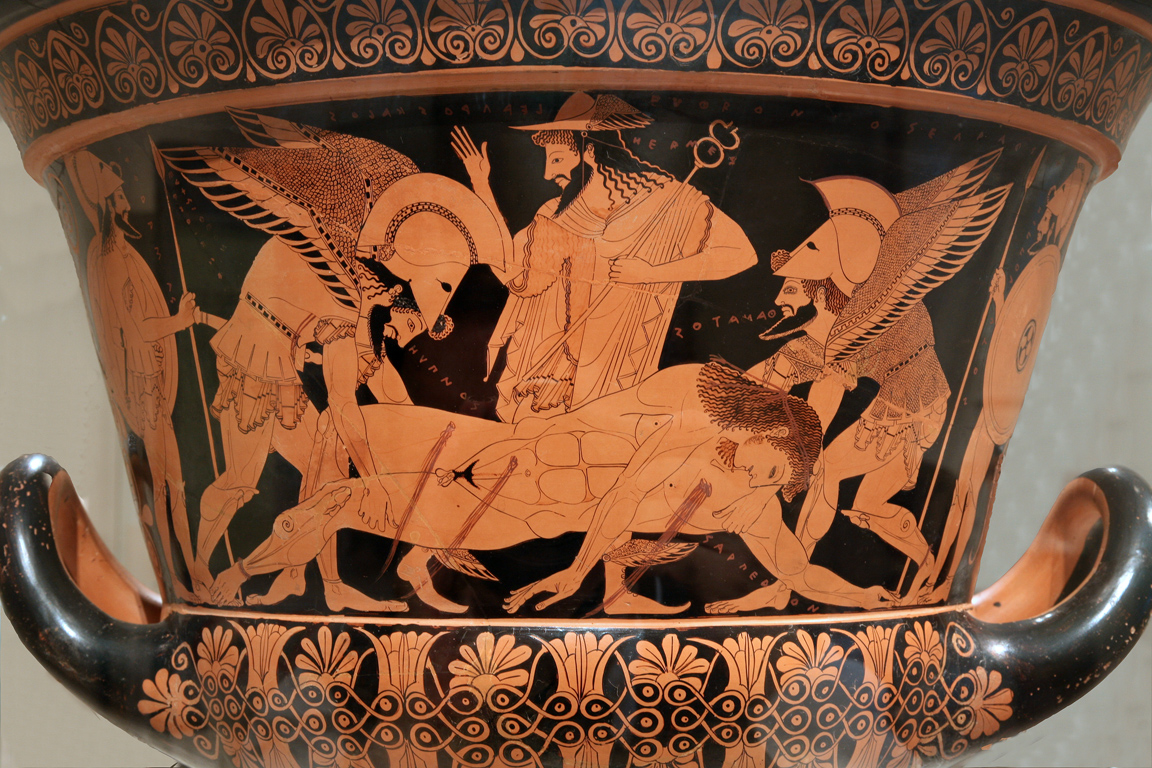
Hypnos (left) and Thanatos (right)

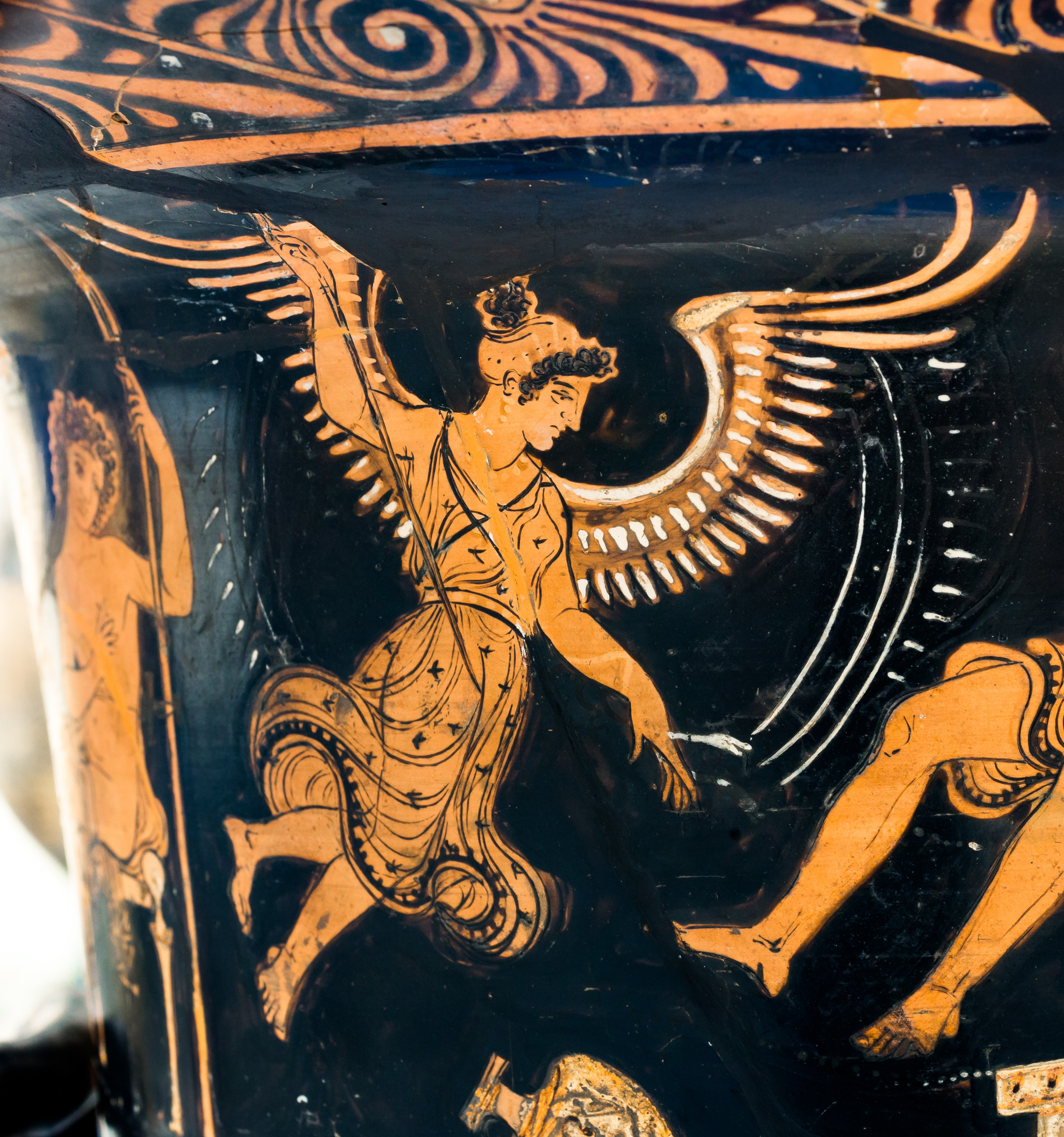
Lyssa

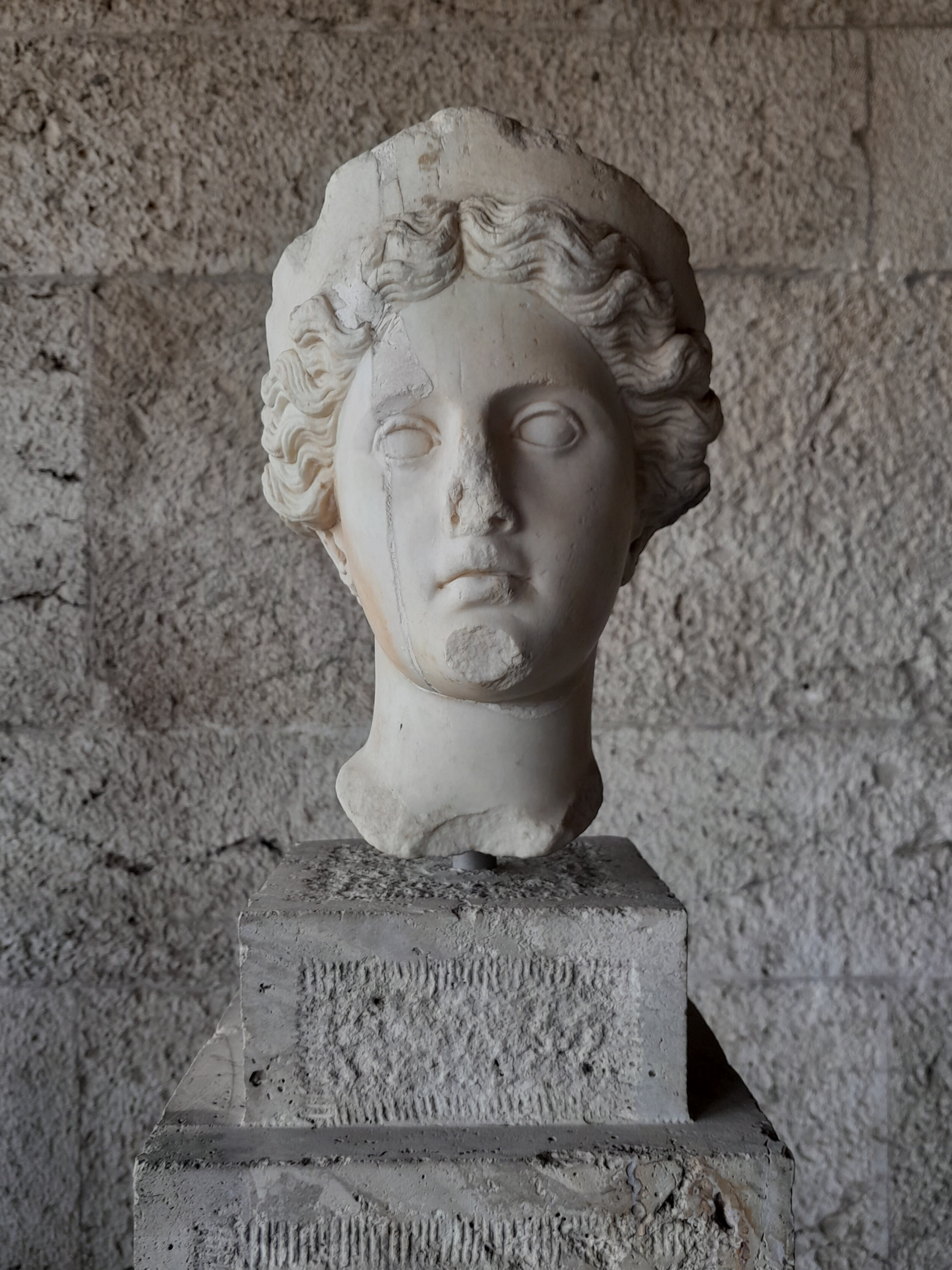
Nemesis

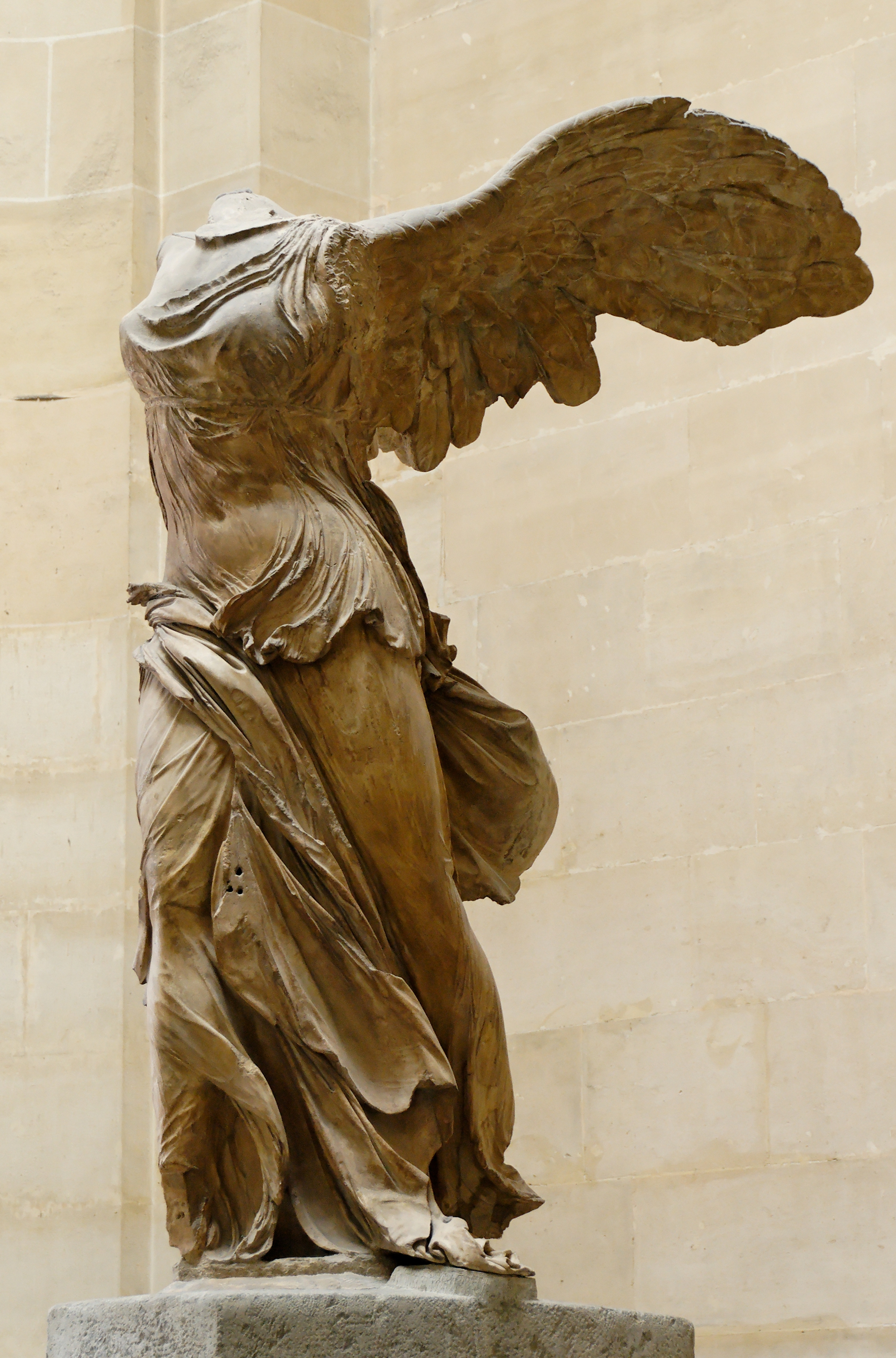
Nike

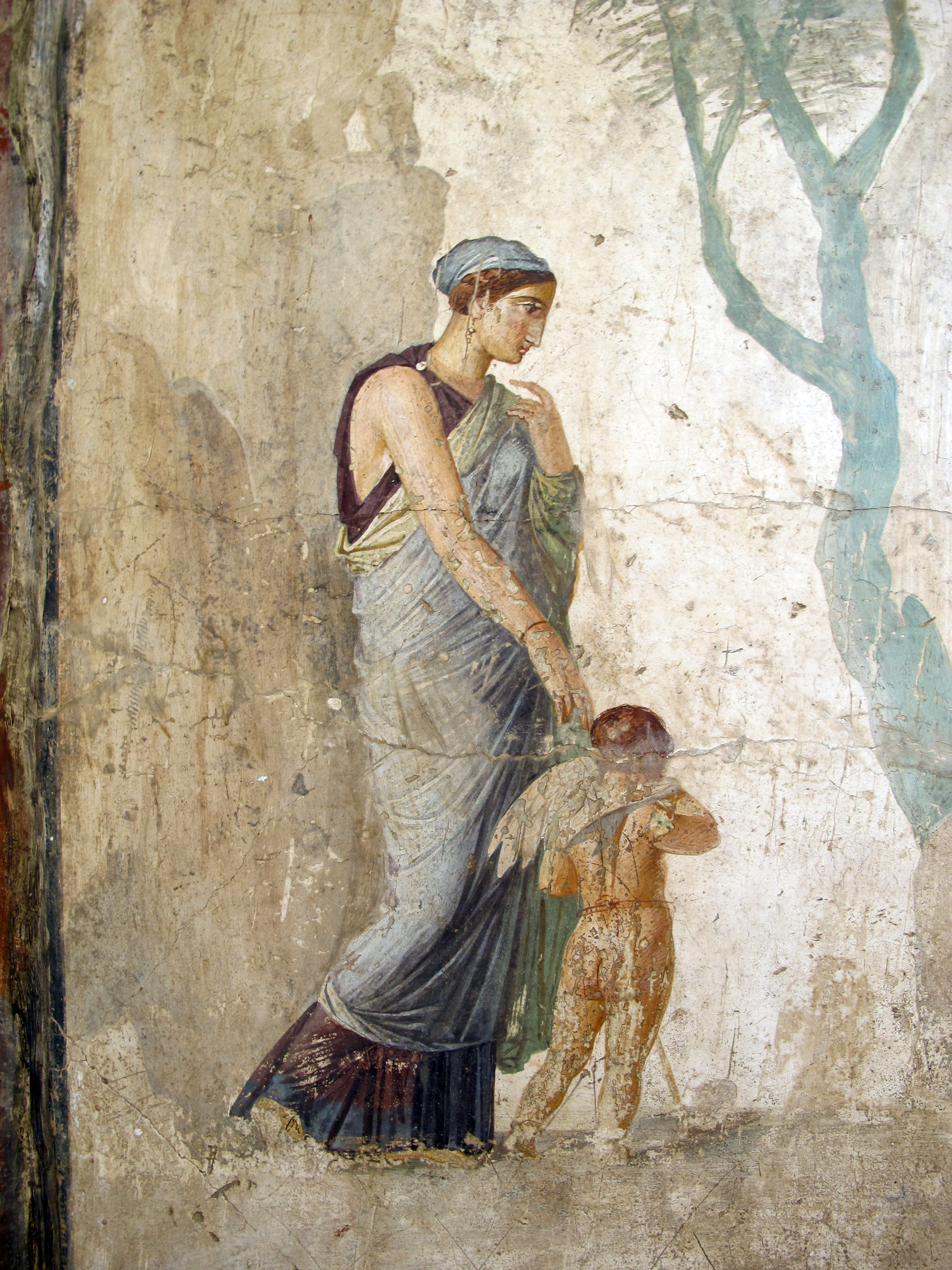
Peitho

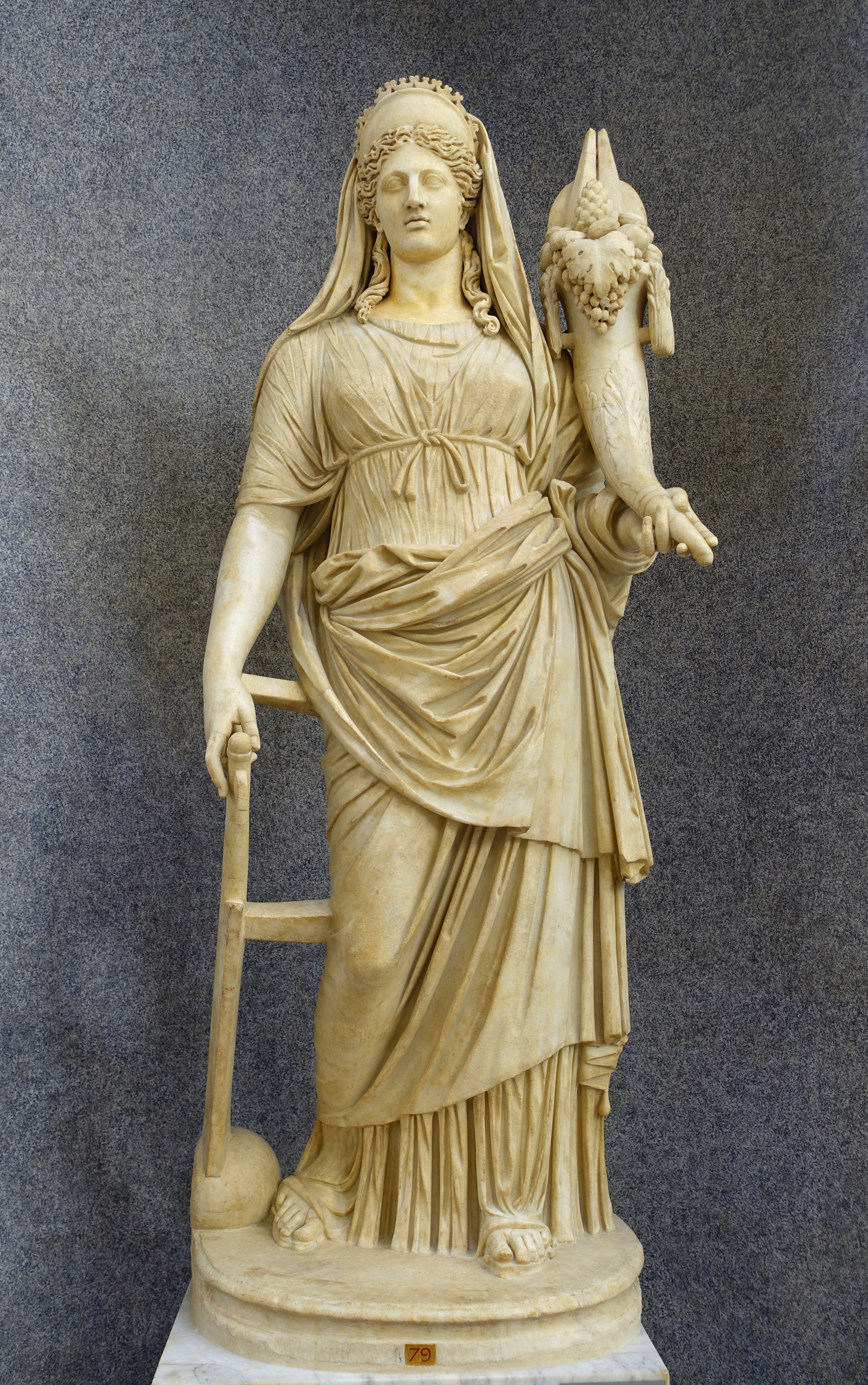
Tyche

List of abstract personifications, with a description of each
Name	Personified concept	Description
Achlys	Misery, sadness	In the Shield of Heracles, she is one of the figures pictured on Heracles' shield. Her Latin counterpart, Caligo, is said to be the parent of Chaos and Nox in the Fabulae.
Adikia	Injustice	Her earliest attestation is a depiction on the Chest of Cypselus (c. 600 BC), which shows her being pummeled by Dike. The two are also depicted on a pair of 6th-century BC Attic vases. In art, Adikia is portrayed as ugly, bearing spots in one instance.
Agon	Athletic contests	There existed a statue of him at Olympia.
Aidos	Shame or modesty	She appears in the Works and Days alongside Nemesis, and Sophocles states that she sits beside Zeus and witnesses all actions that are taken. In Plato's story of Protagoras, Aidos approaches humankind alongside Dike.
Aion	Eternal time	Euripides calls Chronos his father, and he is mentioned in the proem of the Orphic Hymns, though he is otherwise absent from Orphic literature. In Nonnus's Dionysiaca, he is an old man who advises Zeus.
Alala	The war cry	According to Pindar, she is the daughter of Polemos.
Alastor	The curse of generational guilt	He features in tragic literature, and is described as the figure who enacts vengeance for wicked actions. In Aeschylus, he is a daimon who is pernicious in nature but unassociated with vengeance.
Aletheia	Truth	She is said to be the offspring of Zeus, and to nurture Apollo during his childhood.
Algea	Pains	They are daughters of Eris.
Alke	Battle strength	In the Iliad, she is depicted on the aegis.
Amechania	Impossibility	One of the gods of the people of Andros, according to Herodotus.
Amphilogiai	Verbal exchanges	They are offspring of Eris.
Anaideia	Shamelessness	Authors mention an altar or sanctuary dedicated to Anaideia in Athens.
Ananke	Necessity or compulsion	She is first attested as a cosmic goddess in the 5th century BC, appearing in the works of Parmenides, Simonides, and Empedocles. In the Hieronyman Theogony, attributed to Orpheus, she produces Aether, Chaos, and Erebus by Chronos. In the Hellenistic period (c. 323–30 BC), she is identified with Adrasteia. In Plato's Republic, she is the mother of the Moirai.
Androktasiai	Slaughter of men during war	They are offspring of Eris in the Theogony.
Angelia	Report	According to Pindar, she is the daughter of Hermes.
Anteros	Requited love	He is said to punish those who do not reciprocate love. He had an altar in Athens close to the Acropolis, and was depicted alongside Eros in a relief that was displayed in Elis.
Apate	Deceit	In Hesiod's Theogony, she is an offspring of Nyx. In a fragment of Orphic literature, she and Zelus receive Aphrodite after her birth from the sea. In the Dionysiaca, she possesses a girdle that contains all forms of deceit.
Apheleia	Simplicity, "the good old days"	Eustathius calls her the nurse of Athena.
Ara	The curse	Aeschylus identifies her with Erinys (sing. of 'Erinyes').
Arete	Goodness	She appears in a 5th-century BC allegory by Prodicus, in which Heracles must choose either Arete or Kakia (the personification of vice). A giant statue of her was produced by Euphranor, according to Pliny the Elder. In a late genealogy, she is the offspring of Praxidike and Zeus Soter.
Astrape	The lightning bolt	She was present in several lost works of art, including a painting by Apelles and a depiction of Semele's death. She is connected with Bronte.
Ate	Delusion	She is said to deceive Zeus, who then hurls her down from Olympus as punishment. She lands on a hill in Phrygia, in the location in which Troy will later be founded. In the Iliad she is the daughter of Zeus, while in the Theogony she is one of the offspring of Eris.
Bia	Violence	She is the offspring of Pallas and Styx, and alongside her siblings – Kratos, Nike, and Zelus – she is said to live on Mount Olympus, where she serves Zeus. According to Aeschylus, she helps Hephaestus attach Prometheus to a rock after his deception of Zeus.
Bronte	Thunder	She appears in the proem of the Orphic Hymns, and is at times found alongside Sterope and Astrape. She was represented in several works of Greek and Roman art, including a painting by Apelles.
Caerus	The "opportune moment"	He is attested from the 5th century BC, and is called the son of Zeus. He was worshipped at Olympia. In art, he is depicted as a winged figure with a tuffet of hair on the front of his head.
Chronos	Time	He is a primeval being in the cosmogony of Pherecydes of Syros, and is an important figure in theogonies attributed to Orpheus. In the Hieronyman Theogony, one such work, he is a winged, serpentine figure with the heads of a lion and bull, and produces Aether, Chaos, and Erebus with Ananke. Later sources sometimes conflate him with the Titan Cronus.
Comus	Revelry	According to Philostratus the Elder, there was an artwork which depicted him as a young, winged boy, drunk and with his head sitting on his chest.
Corus	Surfeit	He is the offspring of Hybris.
Deimos	Fear	Hesiod calls him the son of Ares and Aphrodite, and in the Iliad he is a companion of Ares alongside his brother, Phobos. According to the Aspis, the two are his charioteers.
Dike	Justice	In the Theogony, she is one of the three Horae, offspring of Zeus and Themis. She is intimately connected with Zeus, and is sometimes said to sit next to his throne, acting as his delegate and keeping a record of sinful actions for him. She was depicted on the Chest of Cypselus as a beautiful figure, who strangles the ugly Adikia. Hesychia is said to be her daughter, and Poena her assistant.
Dysnomia	Lawlessness	In the Theogony, she is one of the offspring of Eris.
Eirene	Peace	Hesiod lists her among the three Horae, offspring of Zeus and Themis. There existed a cult to her in Athens from the 4th century BC, and she is depicted on vases from Attica. Several of her cults are attested during the Hellenistic period (c. 323–30 BC).
Eleos	Compassion	There was an altar honouring him in Athens.
Eleutheria	Freedom	She is called the daughter of Zeus, and elsewhere an attendant of Aletheia. She appears on coins.
Elpis	Hope	In Hesiod's Works and Days, when Pandora opens her jar, releasing the evils contained therein, Elpis is the only personification who does not leave.
Eris	Strife	In the Theogony she is among the gloomy offspring of Nyx, and in the Iliad she is called Ares' sister. In the Works and Days, there are two figures named Eris, one the daughter of Nyx and the other less negative in nature. She is said to indirectly bring about the start of the Trojan War by tossing a golden apple into the wedding of Peleus and Thetis, causing the Judgement of Paris.
Eucleia	Glory from a day of fighting	There was a sanctuary in Athens in honour of both her and Eunomia. According to Plutarch, some considered Heracles and Myrto her parents, while others conflated her with Artemis. She is found alongside Eunomia on vases from the 5th century BC.
Eulabeia	Caution	In Euripides' Phoenician Women, Eteocles asks her to save Thebes.
Eunomia	Good order	In Hesiod's Theogony she is one of the three Horae, daughters of Zeus and Themis. She was considered a protector of peace, and during the 5th century BC her name was used in politics. She was represented in 5th-century BC vase paintings alongside Eucleia, and she had a cult in Athens.
Eupraxia	Success	According to Aeschylus's Seven Against Thebes, she is the daughter of Peitharchia.
Eusebeia	Piety	She is the mother of Dike in Orphic literature, and is mentioned in the proem of the Orphic Hymns. A figure with this name is depicted on Alexandrian coins.
Gelos	Laughter	Plutarch mentions a Spartan sanctuary in his honour, and Apuleius states that he was worshipped in the city of Hypata.
Geras	Old age	In the Theogony, he is among the offspring of Nyx. In a late tale, he helps Sisyphus escape the underworld. He is also said to lose in a fight with Heracles, and to live on Olympus.
Hedone	Desire, joy, pleasure	She appears as an allegorical personification in works of Greek philosophy. Apuleius gives her parents as Cupid (the Latin name for Eros) and Psyche.
Heimarmene	Fate	She is depicted on a 5th-century BC vase by the Heimarmene Painter.
Himeros	Affectionate longing	In the Theogony, he and Eros accompany Aphrodite after she is born from the sea. He is said to reside on Olympus, and in art is identical to Eros.
Homados	Tumult	In Hesiod's Shield of Heracles, he is depicted on Heracles' shield.
Homonoia	Concord, unanimity, oneness of mind	She is known from the 4th century BC onwards, and there is early evidence of her cult in Olympia, Athens, and elsewhere. According to Mnaseas, her parents are Zeus Soter and Praxidike. She is represented on several Greek coins and a vase.
Horkos	Curse resulting from swearing a false oath	In the Theogony Hesiod places him among the offspring of Eris, and in the Works and Days he writes that the Erinyes help with his birth. According to Sophocles, he is Zeus's son.
Horme	Energetic activity	Pausanias mentions an altar to her in the agora of Athens.
Hybris	Lack of restraint, insolence	In one version of Pan's parentage, she is his mother by Zeus.
Hygieia	Health	She was considered the child of Asclepius. From the beginning of the 4th century BC, she became the most prominent family member in her father's cult, and was present in sanctuaries dedicated to him. She was sometimes considered to be Asclepius's wife instead.
Hypnos	Sleep	According to Hesiod he is among the offspring of Nyx, and lives beside his brother Thanatos at the furthest reaches of the earth. In the Iliad he and Thanatos carry the deceased Sarpedon to Lycia, an episode that appears on vase paintings. Elsewhere in the work, Hera requests he lull Zeus to sleep, and Hypnos protests that after a previous attempt to do so he had to escape Zeus's wrath; she persuades him by offering Pasithea in marriage. In art, he is typically a young, winged figure, and alongside Thanatos he is depicted on the Chest of Cypselus.
Hysminai	Combat	In the Theogony, they are offspring of Eris. Quintus Smyrnaeus names them among the personifications found on Achilles' shield.
Ioke	Pursuit	In the Iliad, she is among the personifications depicted on the aegis.
Kakia	Vice	In an allegory by the philosopher Prodicus, Heracles must choose either Arete (the personification of goodness) or Kakia, the latter of whom tells the hero she is also called Eudaimonia. She is also found in works by Athenian orators.
Keres	Inevitability of death	Female figures who according to Hesiod are daughters of Nyx that wear blood-covered clothing. In the Iliad they are said to cause disaster, and to steal human bodies and take them into the underworld before consuming them. In sources of the classical period (c. 5th–4th centuries BC), they are sometimes conflated with similar figures such as the Moirai.
Kratos	Power	In the Theogony, he is among the offspring of Pallas and Styx, and is the brother of Bia. Alongside his siblings, he accompanies Zeus. In Aeschylus' Prometheus Bound, he and Bia urge Hephaestus to fasten Prometheus to a rock.
Kydoimos	Tumult of battle	In the Iliad, he is found on the shield of Achilles.
Lethe	Oblivion	She is among the offspring of Eris, and is sometimes said to be the mother of Dionysus or the Charites. Lethe, the underworld river, received its name from her.
Limos	Hunger	She is an offspring of Eris.
Litae	Prayers of contrition	In the Iliad, they are daughters of Zeus and are said to answer prayers which display sufficient respect.
Lyssa	Rage, frenzy, and madness	She is first attested in 5th-century BC tragedy, appearing in Euripides as a daughter of Nyx who drives Heracles to insanity, causing him to murder his family. Euripides also describes her as a huntress who drives a chariot and has snakes surrounding her face. In Aeschylus, she brings madness upon the Minyades, who dismember someone as a result.
Machai	Wars	In the Theogony, they are daughters of Eris.
Maniae	Madness	They were worshipped in Maniae, close to Megalopolis. Mania (sing. of 'Maniae') is depicted on an Italian vase.
Methe	Drunkenness	She is a companion of Dionysus, represented in art. According to Nonnus, she is the mother of Botrys by Staphylus, the king of Assyria.
Momus	Fault-finding	In the Cypria, Zeus intends to kill off humans with flooding and lightning until Momus instead suggests starting a devastating war; this leads to the beginning of the Trojan War. Hesiod includes him among the children of Nyx.
Moros	Destiny	In the Theogony, he is one of Nyx's offspring.
Neikea	Quarrels	According to Hesiod, Neikea is one of Nyx's children.
Nemesis	Retribution	She is said to be the daughter of Nyx and the mother of Helen by Zeus. In the Cypria, Zeus violates Nemesis while disguised as a swan, after a chase in which she attempts to escape by transforming herself multiple times. She is said to punish those who display hubris or engage in misconduct, and is often equated with Adrasteia. In the 5th century BC, there was a temple to her in Rhamnous, where her cult image was said to have been created.
Nike	Victory	In the Theogony, she is the child of Pallas and Styx, and is said to always accompany Zeus. There is evidence of her worship in Magna Graecia, and in Elis from the 6th century BC. She also had an altar in Olympia. In Athens, she was intimately linked with Athena, who was sometimes called Nike. In art, she is depicted as a winged figure in mid-flight, wearing draped clothing; one of her best-known representations is the Winged Victory of Samothrace.
Nomos	Law	He is first mentioned by Pindar (5th century BC), and is found in works by philosophers. He appears in Orphic literature as the father of Dike or Dikaiosyne, and is addressed in the Orphic Hymns.
Oizys	Pain or distress	According to Hesiod, she is one of the offspring of Nyx.
Oneiroi	Dreams	Hesiod lists them among the offspring of Nyx, and in the Odyssey they live at the western extremes of the earth. In the Iliad, an individual Oneiros is used by Zeus in his deception of Agamemnon.
Palaestra	Wrestling	She is a lover of Hermes, and her father is sometimes named Choricus or Pandocus.
Palioxis	Rally	In Hesiod's Shield of Heracles, she is depicted on Heracles' shield.
Peitharchia	Obedience	According to Aeschylus, her daughter is Eupraxia and her husband is Soter.
Peitho	Persuasion	She is typically found as part of Aphrodite's retinue, and is sometimes called the daughter of that goddess. In Hesiod's Works and Days, she outfits Pandora with gold jewellery. There is evidence of her cult in Athens, and on Thasos as early as the 5th century BC.
Penia	Poverty	In Plato's Symposium, she is the wife of Porus, by whom she becomes the mother of Eros.
Penthus	Grief	According to Pseudo-Plutarch, he is not present when Zeus confers spheres of influence upon the gods, and so is given dominion over honours for (and the mourning of) the dead, the only area which is untaken.
Pheme	Rumour or report	According to Pausanias, there was an altar to her in Athens.
Philotes	Affection	In the Theogony, she is one of Nyx's offspring.
Phobos	Fear	According to Hesiod, he is the son of Ares and Aphrodite, and the brother of Deimos. Alongside his brother, he is said to accompany his father and enter into battle in his chariot. He was worshipped in Sparta.
Phonoi	Killings	In the Theogony, they are offspring of Eris.
Phthonus	Envy	According to Callimachus, he tries to elicit envy within Apollo. In Nonnus's Dionysiaca, he concocts a plan to make Hera envious of Semele, leading eventually to the latter's deception. He also appears on a vase from the 4th century BC.
Plutus	Wealth	According to Hesiod, he is born to Demeter and Iasion (a mortal), who lie with one another in Crete. He was of importance in the Eleusinian Mysteries, and he appears alongside Demeter and Persephone in works of art. He initially personifies agricultural wealth, while in later times his domain broadens to wealth in general. Aristophanes portrays him as blind and elderly.
Poena	Vengeance or punishment	She is found alongside the Erinyes, with whom she is assimilated at times.
Polemos	War	Pindar calls him the father of Alala, while other sources make him the brother of Enyo or a companion of Ares. He also features in a story from Aristophanes' Peace, where he detains Eirene in a cave.
Ponos	Toil and stress	Hesiod lists him among the children of Eris, though elsewhere he is the son of Nyx and Erebus.
Porus	Expediency	He is said to be the father of Eros, the husband of Penia, and the son of Metis.
Pothos	Erotic desire	He is part of Aphrodite's retinue, and is sometimes said to be her son or the son of Eros. On vases, he is depicted as a young, winged boy, identical to other figures in Aphrodite's retinue such as Eros and Himeros.
Proioxis	Pursuit	In Hesiod's Shield of Heracles, she is one of the figures represented on the shield of Heracles.
Prophasis	Excuse	According to Pindar, she is the daughter of Epimetheus.
Soteria	Physical well-being	There is evidence of her worship in the Peloponnese.
Sophrosyne	Prudence and moderation	She is first mentioned by Theognis of Megara (c. 6th century BC). She had a cult in Anatolia.
Telete	Dionysiac rites, especially choral dances	In Nonnus's Dionysiaca, she is the daughter of Dionysus and Nicaea (a nymph).
Thanatos	Death	The Iliad calls him the brother of Hypnos, and in the Theogony the two are children of Nyx. He and his brother are said to carry Sarpedon's corpse to Lycia, a subject found in Attic vase painting as early as the 6th century BC. He is a winged boy in early artistic depictions, later acquiring a beard and hooked nose. In Euripides' Alcestis, there is a fight between him and Heracles.
Tyche	Luck or fortune	In the Theogony she is one of the Oceanids, while for Pindar she is the child of Zeus. She is absent from mythological stories, and is not a clearly definable figure. Her cult is attested from the 4th century BC, and she was identified with other goddesses such as Isis and Cybele. Her iconographic attributes include the cornucopia and the rudder.
Zelus	Envy	In Hesiod's Theogony, he is one of the children of Pallas and Styx.

== Other deities ==
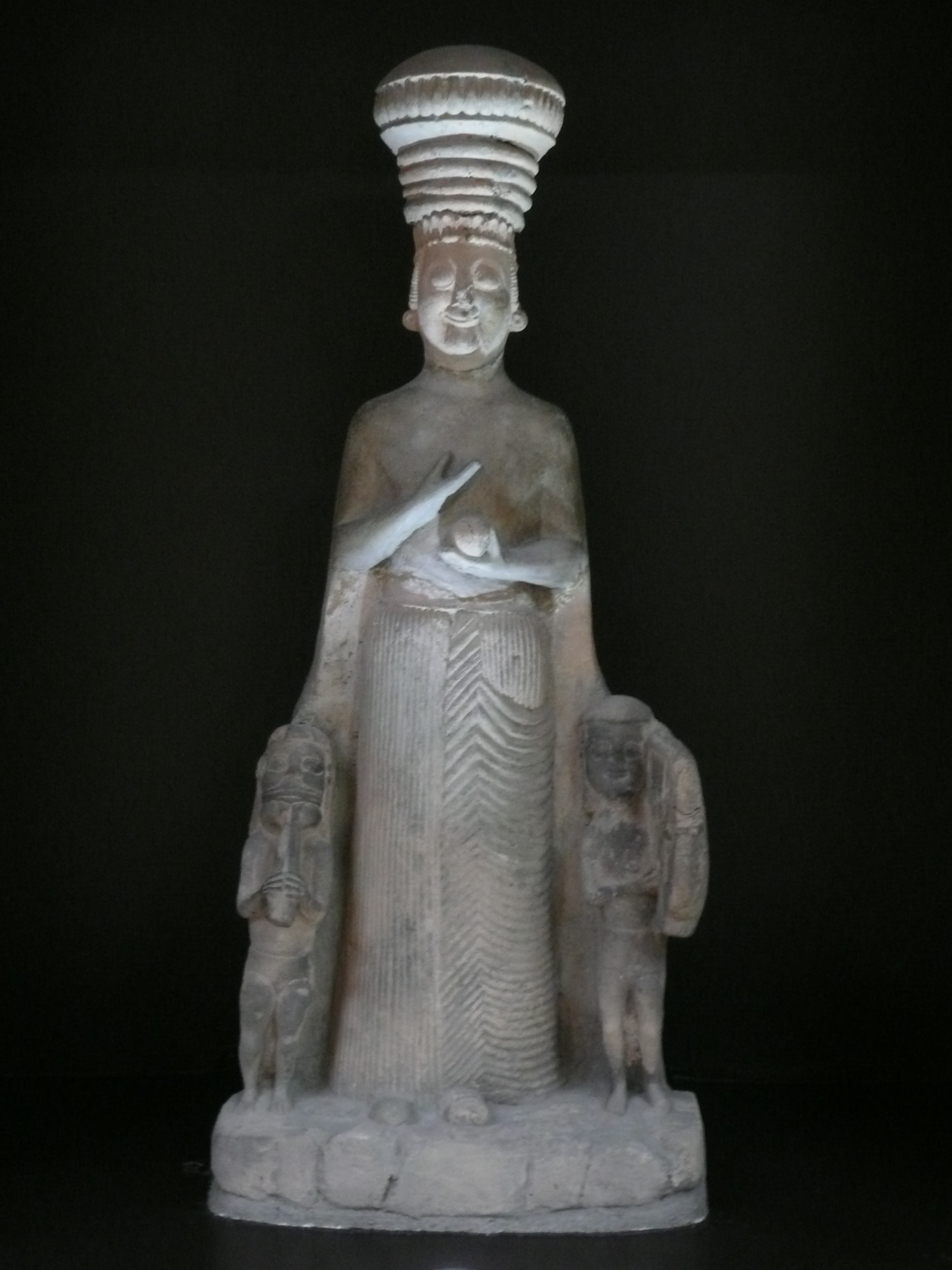
Agdistis

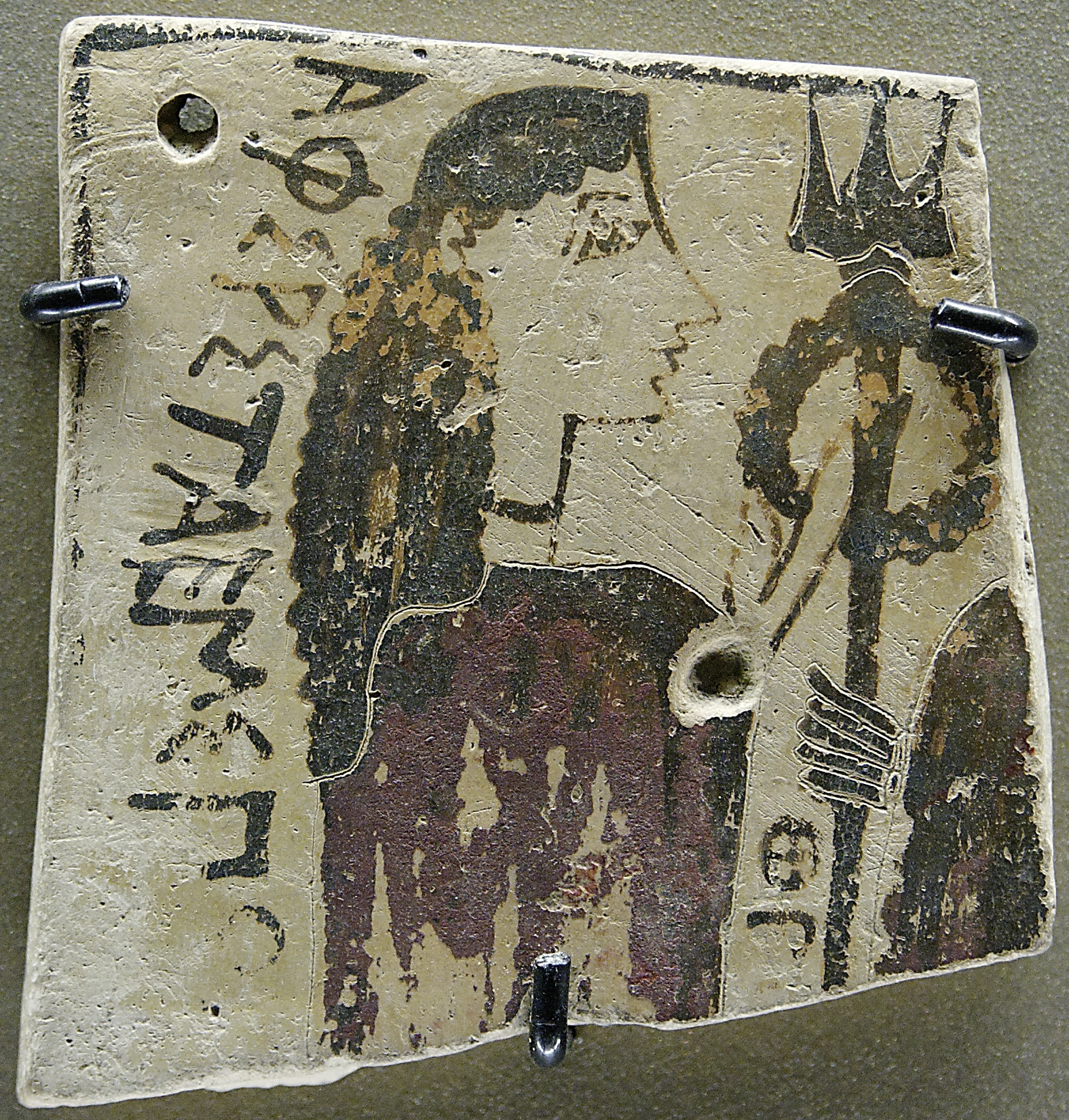
Amphitrite

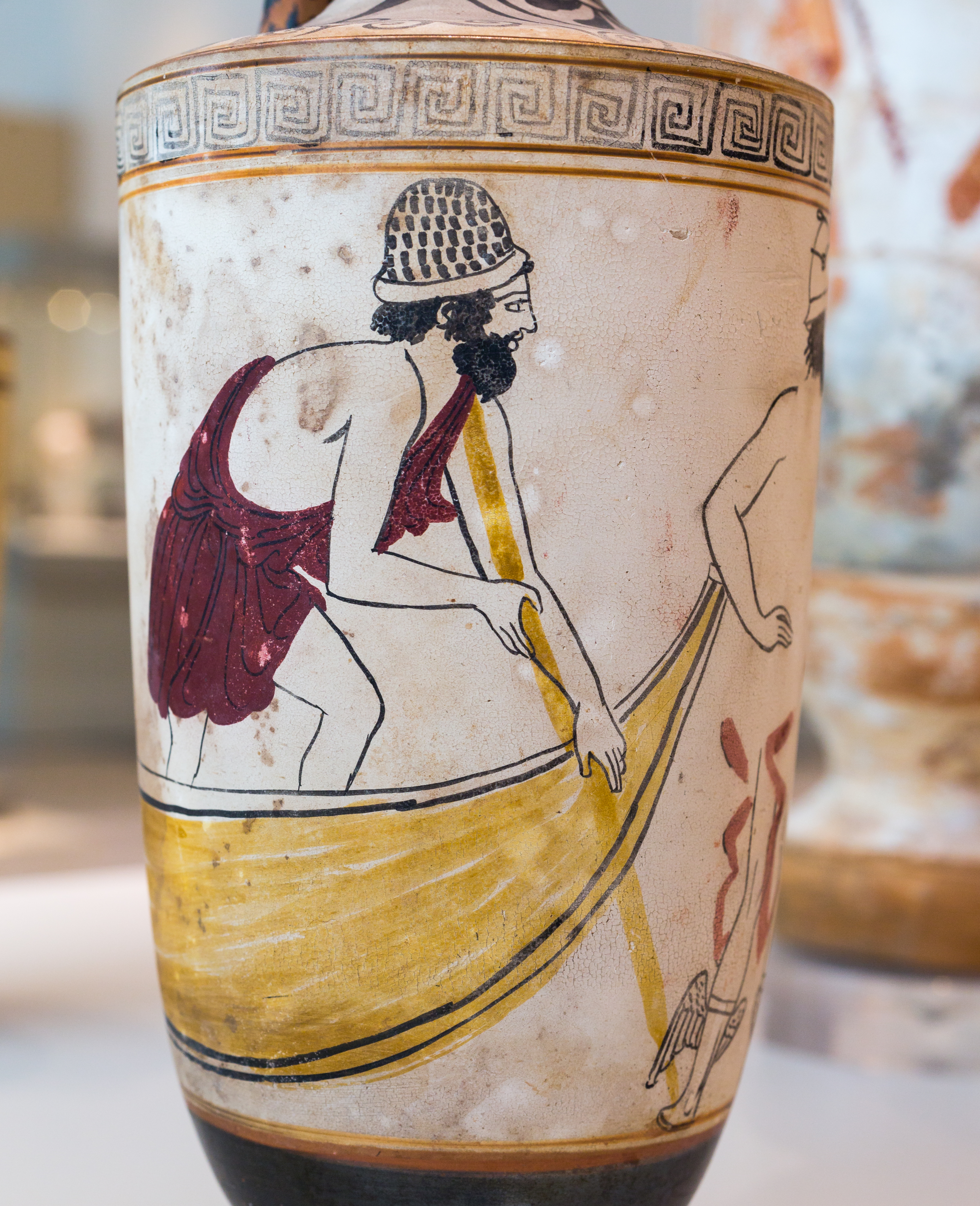
Charon

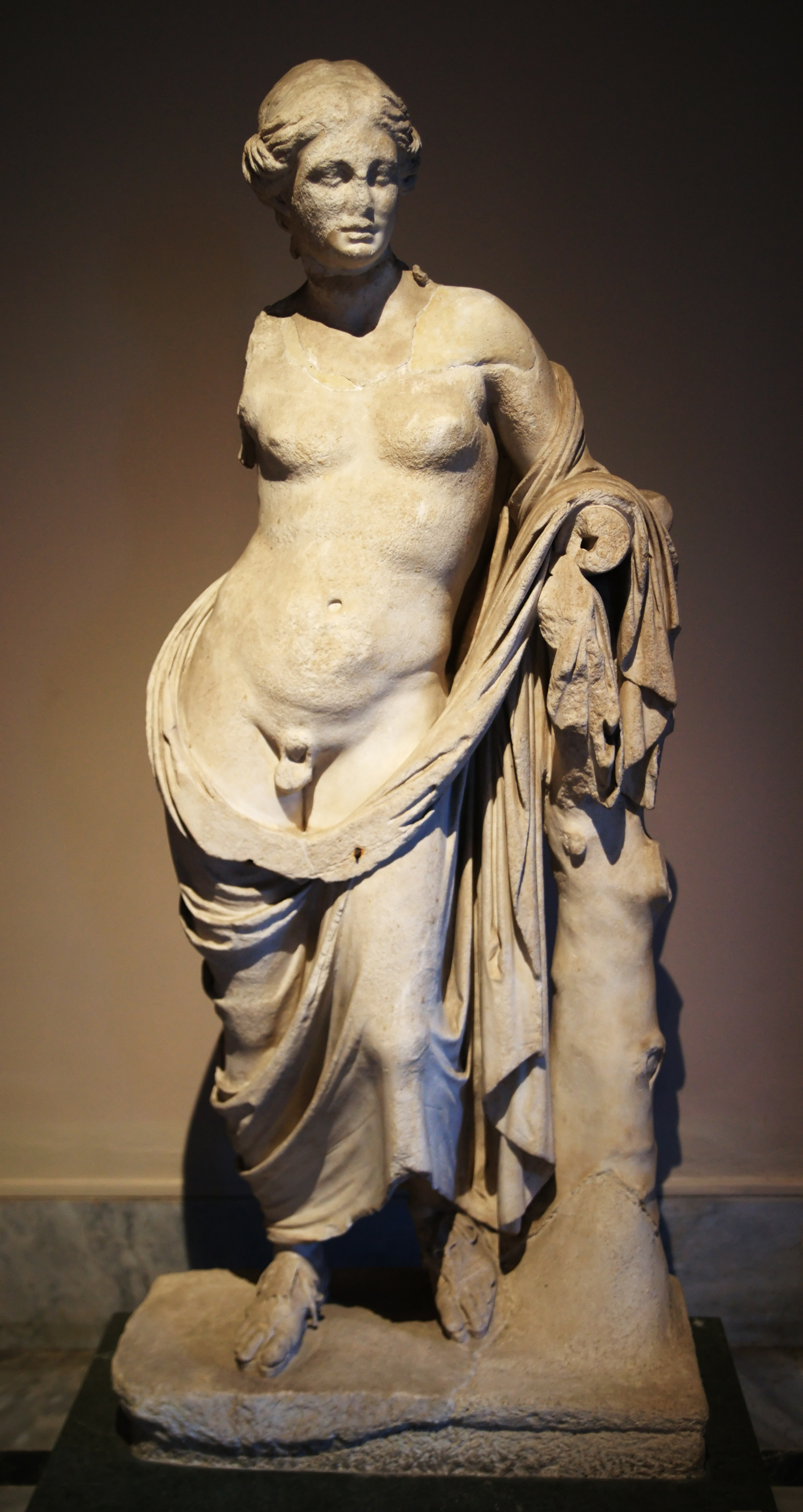
Hermaphroditus

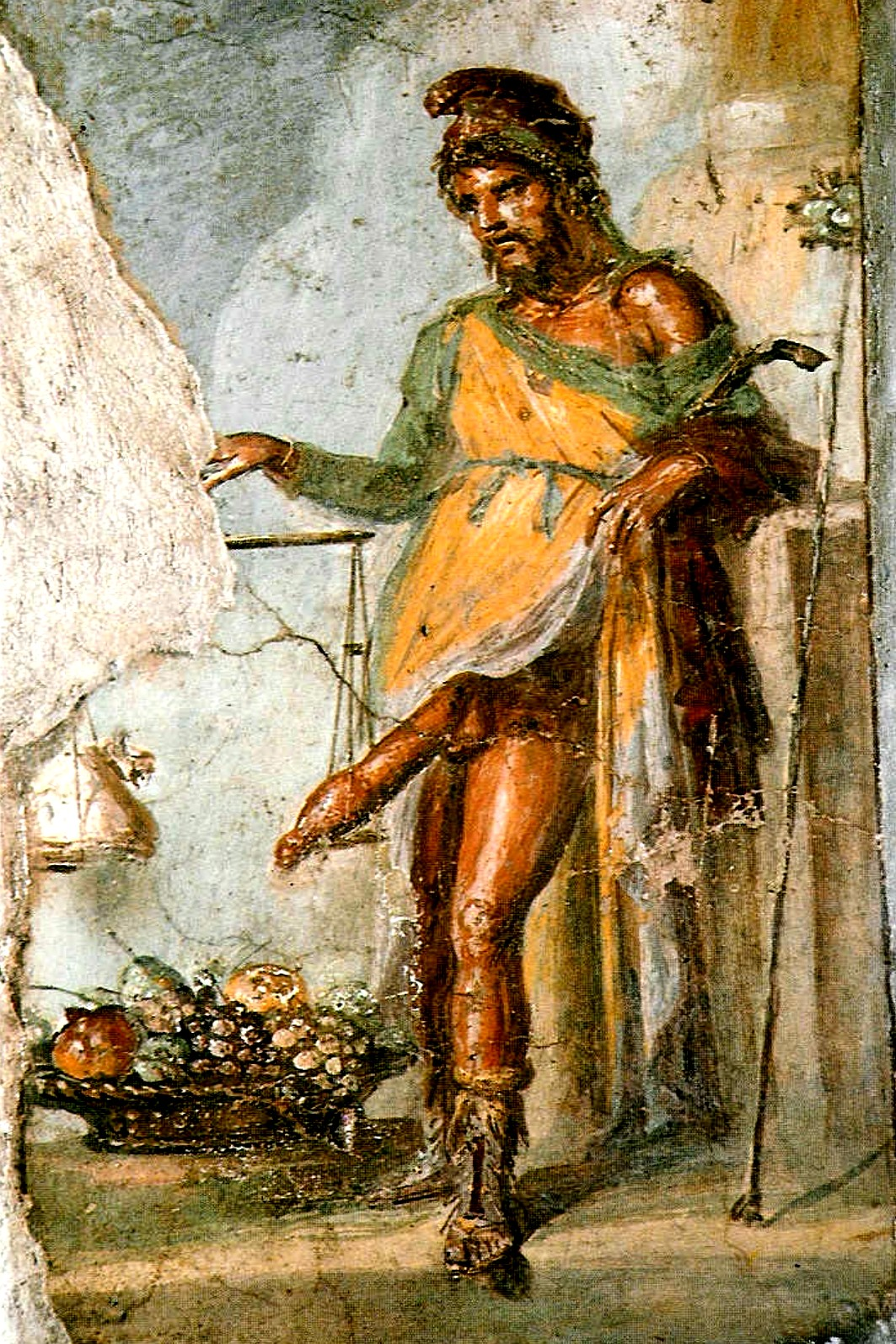
Priapus

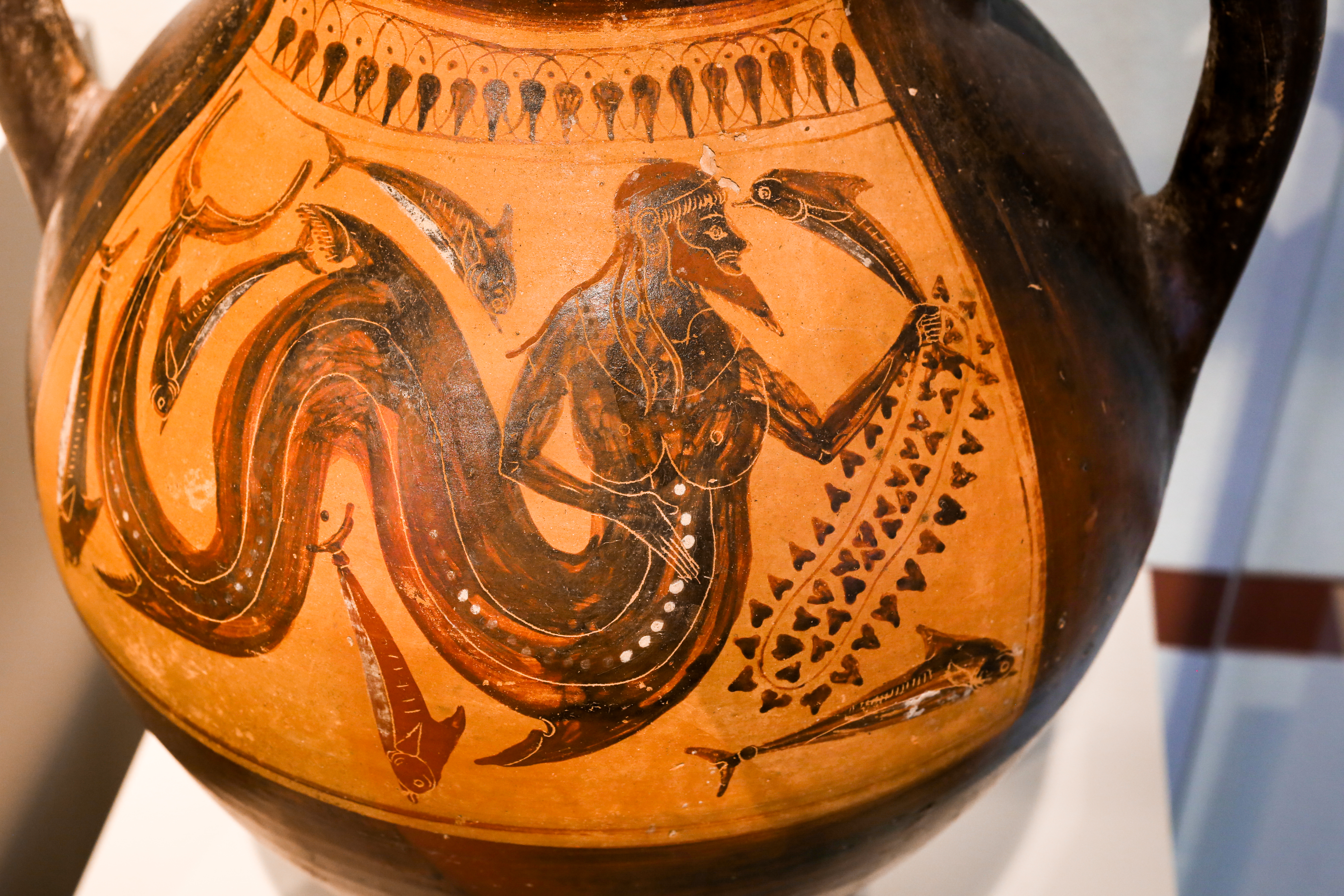
Triton

List of various other deities, with a description of each
Name	Description
Aceso	The daughter of Asclepius and Epione. She received some worship.
Acheron	The offspring of Gaia, and the father of Ascalaphus by Orphne or Gorgyra. Shades journey across the Acheron river when entering the underworld. It is said that Acheron is forced to live underground after permitting the Giants to drink from his stream.
Agathos Daimon	A figure whose name translates as 'good deity'. He was worshipped particularly in a private context, and was the recipient of the first offering when wine was drunk. He was sometimes depicted in the guise of Zeus. He is absent from mythological stories.
Agdistis	A hermaphroditic deity. In a tale from Pessinus, she is born from the earth in the location where some of Zeus's semen falls. Her male genitals are severed and an almond tree grows in the place they land; a woman named Nana becomes pregnant by this tree and gives birth to a boy, Attis. Attis grows into a beautiful young man, and Agdistis (here equated with Cybele) becomes enamoured with him, eventually causing Attis to castrate himself and die in the process.
Amphitrite	A sea goddess. She is a Nereid, and the consort of Poseidon, with whom she lives in a palace under the sea. Before their marriage, Poseidon is sometimes said to kidnap her, or search for her after she rejects his advances and escapes. The couple are the parents of Triton according to Hesiod, and later sources add further children. She was worshipped alongside her husband in the Cyclades, and the two had a sanctuary on Tenos.
Angelos	A daughter of Zeus and Hera. Sophron relates that she is raised by nymphs; she is later sanctified by the Cabeiri, and takes on a role relating to the underworld.
Anytos	A Titan. He was thought to raise Despoina, and there was a statue of him in her temple in Arcadia.
Aphaia	A goddess to whom a temple on the island of Aegina was dedicated. Evidence from the temple implies she was associated with pregnancy and newly born children.
Aristaeus	A god associated with a number of rustic activities. He is born to Apollo and the princess Cyrene, after the god kidnaps her and transports her to Libya. Different sources provide him different teachers or nurturers, from whom he learns skills such as prophecy, healing, and agrarian pursuits such as beekeeping and olive-growing. He marries Autonoe, by whom he fathers the hunter Actaeon. In one story, he accidentally causes the death of Eurydice, and his bees are killed as punishment.
Arke	The daughter of Thaumas and sister of Iris. In the Titanomachy she supports the Titans, and once the Olympian gods are victorious she is imprisoned in Tartarus and stripped of her wings.
Astraea	The child of Zeus and Themis. She dwells among mortals during the Golden Age, though she leaves when this era comes to an end, as humanity grows more immoral.
Auxesia	A goddess worshipped alongside Damia. The pair were venerated at Epidaurus and Troezen, as well as on the island of Aegina (where Auxesia was known as Azesia).
Britomartis	A Cretan goddess. She is born to Zeus and Carme, and is a maiden who accompanies Artemis. She is usually said to attain immortality after jumping into the ocean while trying to escape the lustful advances of Minos. As a goddess, she is referred to as Dictynna. In addition to Crete, she was worshipped in Aegina, Sparta, Athens, and Gythium, among other locations. In artistic depictions, her appearance is identical to that of Artemis.
Brizo	A goddess venerated by the women of Delos, honoured primarily as a protector of ships. She was believed to be capable of perceiving the prophetic meaning behind dreams.
Charon	The ferryman of the underworld. Though sources do not provide him with a divine parentage, he is treated as though he is a deity. He transports shades across the Acheron river in a boat, taking payment in the form of an obol. He is portrayed as a hideous and dishevelled old man, dressed in tattered clothing. In one story, he transports the living Heracles across the river, and is chained for a year as punishment.
Circe	An enchantress. She is the offspring of Helios and Perse, and is considered either a goddess or a nymph. She is said to inhabit the mythical island of Aeaea, which is visited by Odysseus and his companions, half of whom she transforms into animals. She only returns them to their usual form when Odysseus is able to resist her spell using the herb moly. He extends his stay on the island, and the pair have two children, Telegonus and Cassiphone (though some sources add further offspring).
Damia	A goddess venerated in conjunction with Auxesia. The two were worshipped in Epidaurus and Troezen, and on the island of Aegina (where Damia was referred to as Mnia).
Despoina	A goddess venerated in Arcadia. She is said to be born from a union of Poseidon and Demeter (both in the form of horses), and to be raised by Anytus, a Titan. She was honoured at a temple in Lycosura, where fragments of 2nd-century BC cult statues survive. Despoina ('Mistress') was a cult title of the goddess, rather than her true name, which was only uttered during ritual performance and does not survive.
Enodia	A goddess from Thessaly. She presides over roads and has chthonic qualities, being associated with horses, dogs, and torches. By the 5th century BC, she was identified with Hecate. Her worship seemingly originated in Pherae and spread to Macedonia. There is also evidence of her cult in Epidaurus, Oreus, and Lindos.
Enyo	A war goddess. She is a companion of Ares, to whom she is often genealogically related, and with him she produces a son, Enyalius. She was among the deities honoured in a festival which took place in Thebes and Orchomenus. In Rome, she was equated with Bellona.
Epione	The wife of Asclepius. Her children by her husband include Hygieia, Iaso, and Panacea, and she was involved in his cult in Epidaurus, in Athens, and on Kos. Merops is sometimes given as her father.
Ersa	The personification of dew. According to Alcman, she is the daughter of Zeus and Selene.
Eubuleus	An important figure in the Eleusinian Mysteries. In the Eleusinian myth of Persephone's abduction, he returns her from the underworld. In artistic depictions, he carries a torch and is typically found beside Persephone. In another version of the myth, he tends to a group of pigs, who fall into the ground when she is kidnapped. He is also mentioned in the Orphic gold tablets, and is sometimes assimilated with Zeus or Dionysus.
Eunostus	A goddess associated with mills. An idol of her was placed in mills.
Glaucus	A sea god. He is born a mortal, and lives as a fisherman in Anthedon before one day consuming grass which turns him into a deity, giving him a green body and the tail of a fish; he also attains prophetic abilities. He amorously pursues Scylla, a beautiful maiden, to no avail, and rejects the advances of the enchantress Circe, prompting the latter to turn Scylla into a monstrous creature. In other myths, he is a deliverer of news to the Argonauts or to Menelaus.
Harmonia	The wife of Cadmus. Her parents are typically said to be Ares and Aphrodite, though in some sources they are Zeus and Electra. She is either divine or semi-divine. The gods are present at her marriage to Cadmus, and offer the couple gifts, including a necklace and robe. By her husband, she becomes the mother of Polydorus, Ino, Autonoë, Semele, and Agave.
Hebe	The goddess of youth. She is born to Zeus and Hera, and becomes the wife of Heracles after his apotheosis. She carries out minor duties for the gods, including acting as their cupbearer. In one story, she restores the youth of Iolaus. She was worshipped in Argos, in Mantinea, and on Kos.
Hermaphroditus	A figure with both male and female genitalia. He is first attested in the 4th century BC, and in the 1st century BC Hermes and Aphrodite are assigned as his parents. In Ovid's telling, he is born a boy, and during his youth he attracts the unappreciated advances of a nymph, Salmacis, who on one occasion clings to him and begs the gods to ensure they never part. They oblige, causing the pair to fuse into a dual-sexed being. He is represented in art from the 4th century BC onwards.
Hymen	The god of marriage. He is said to be born to Apollo and one of the Muses, or to Dionysus and Aphrodite, among other parentages. There exist varying stories designed to explain his connection to marriage, and he is sometimes described as an Athenian, a musician, or a lover of Hesperus.
Iacchus	A god of the Eleusinian Mysteries. He was connected with the procession in which initiates marched to Eleusis, and it is likely he originally personified the exclamation íakch', ô íakche, chanted during this procession. In later sources, he is sometimes called the child of Demeter, Dionysus, or Persephone. As Persephone's son, he is Dionysus Zagreus in his reborn form, following that god's dismemberment as a child by the Titans.
Iaso	A goddess associated with healing. She is one of Asclepius's children, and was worshipped in Oropus.
Lelantos	A Titan. He is the father of Aura by Periboea.
Moirai	Goddesses, known in Latin as the Fates, who allot humans their destinies at the beginning of life. Hesiod makes them three in number – naming them Clotho, Lachesis, and Atropos – and calls them children of Nyx and of Zeus and Themis at different points. In the Iliad, there is mention of both the collective term and the singular Moira, who is said to spin Hector's fate with thread. They had a sanctuary in Sparta and an altar in Sicyon, and were given wineless sacrifices. Artistic depictions typically represent them as a trio of goddesses taking part in a mythological scene.
Opora	A goddess associated with harvests, particularly those of wine. She appears as a companion of Eirene in Aristophanes' Peace. In one myth, she attracts the amorous attention of Sirius, though he fails to win her hand and Boreas tasks his sons with retrieving her.
Orthanes	A fertility deity. He was a phallic god, and his cult existed in Attica and on Imbros, where there was a festival in his honour as late as the 2nd century BC.
Paean	A healing god in Homeric epic. He heals the wounds of Hades and Ares, and is said to live on Olympus.
Palaemon	A sea deity, who is originally a human named Melicertes, born to Athamas and Ino. His mother one day jumps from a cliff with him in her arms, after which the pair are deified, becoming Palaemon and Leucothea. He was worshipped at the sanctuary of Poseidon at Isthmia.
Panacea	A daughter of Asclepius in his cult, who was herself worshipped in certain locations.
Pandia	A daughter of Selene and Zeus, according to the Homeric Hymn to Selene.
Paregoros	A goddess from Megara. A statue of her sat in the Megarian temple of Aphrodite.
Pasikrate	A goddess with a sanctuary near Demetrias. She was honoured primarily by women, and is attested in inscriptions from the end of the 4th century BC onwards.
Phanes	A primeval deity in Orphic theogonies. In different Orphic sources, he is described as hermaphroditic, as part-animal, and as having golden wings. He is sometimes called the offspring of Aether and the father of Nyx. In the Orphic Rhapsodies, he emerges from an egg created by Chronos, and is later swallowed by Zeus. He is sometimes called Protogonos, Pan, Priapus, or Antuages, and is at times the same as Eros, Dionysus, or Metis.
Praxidike	An oath goddess. She is said to mate with Zeus Soter, producing Homonoia, Arete, and Ctesius. There was a sanctuary to the Praxidikai (pl. of 'Praxidike') in Haliartus where oaths were sworn. In artistic depictions, it is likely she was represented solely by a head.
Priapus	A fertility god. His mother is Aphrodite, and his father is sometimes given as Dionysus or Hermes. He is depicted as having an erect, oversized phallus, and he was thought to guard livestock or bees, and aid herdsmen and fishermen. His cult originated in the Hellespoint region, spreading abroad after the 4th century BC. It is said that Hera gives him his physical deformity while he is in the womb, causing his mother to abandon him. In one story, he attempts to rape Lotis, but is revealed by the braying of a donkey.
Promylaia	A goddess of mills. Representations of her sat in mills.
Proteus	A sea god. He is one of the deities referred to as the "Old Man of the Sea", and is said to possess prophetic and shapeshifting abilities. He looks after Poseidon's herd of seals and other marine animals, and resides on Pharos, an island near Egypt. In the Odyssey, when Menelaus is marooned on Pharos, he binds Proteus, resisting the god's attempts to transform, and seeks advice from him. Virgil tells a similar story, in which it is Aristaeus who traps Proteus.
Rhapso	A goddess mentioned in an inscription from Athens. She is seemingly related to sewing.
Silenus	An elderly satyr. He is described as a severely drunken figure, hideous and overweight in appearance, with a donkey for a mount. He is sometimes called the child of Pan, or of Hermes by a nymph, and is said to father Pholus upon a Melie (sing. of 'Meliae'). Some sources make him a teacher of Dionysus during that god's youth. In his most famous myth, he is captured for his sage advice by Midas, who detains him by adding wine to his favourite spring.
Sosipolis	A divine child. At Olympia, he was worshipped alongside Eileithyia, who was seemingly considered his mother.
Syceus	A Titan, according to Androtion. His mother, Gaia, is said to rescue him from Zeus by creating a lightning-resistant fig tree in which he can hide.
Telesphorus	A healing god, conceived of as a child. There is evidence of his cult from the 2nd century BC onwards, and Pausanias describes his worship in Pergamon. He was often venerated alongside Asclepius and Hygieia.
Thalassa	A personification of the sea. Ion of Chios calls her the mother of Briareus, one of the Hecatoncheires. She is addressed in one of the Orphic Hymns, where she is identified with Tethys.
Thyone	The name of the mortal Semele, after her deification. Semele is a child of Cadmus and Harmonia, and attracts the attention of Zeus, becoming his lover. Hera tricks the girl into asking Zeus to come to her in the form he comes to his wife. Upon doing so, Zeus reduces her to ashes, though he manages to extract her unborn child, Dionysus. Semele is later deified when her son brings her up from the underworld to live on Olympus.
Triteia	The daughter of Triton. By Ares, she becomes the mother of Melanippus, who names the city of Tritaia after her.
Triton	A sea god, and the child of Poseidon and Amphitrite. In art, he is portrayed with a human upper half and a fish's tail, and he often appears sounding a conch-shell horn. He is said to help guide the Argonauts back out to sea when they find themselves at Lake Tritonis in Libya. The plural Tritons is used to refer to a species of marine figures with fishtails, who are companions of Poseidon and common subjects in Hellenistic art.
Tychon	A god of success. He is ithyphallic, and there is evidence of his worship in Boeotia around the beginning of the 3rd century BC.
Zagreus	A deity sometimes equated with Dionysus. His original nature is unclear; Aeschylus represents him as a god of the underworld, and he may have been assimilated with Hades. He is seemingly later fused with an Orphic Dionysus, the child of Zeus and Persephone, who is dismembered by the Titans and reincarnated. This tale of dismemberment, sometimes called the "Zagreus myth", has been viewed as the principal myth of Orphism, though the name "Zagreus" is not mentioned in any extant Orphic source.

== See also ==
- Lists of deities
- Lists of Greek mythological figures
- List of mortals in Greek mythology
- List of Greek mythological creatures
