= Damia (mythology) =

Minor Greek goddess

Damia (Ancient Greek: Δαμια) was a minor goddess of the fertile earth in Greek mythology, treated in some accounts as an independent deity and in others as an epithet of the goddess Demeter. Some sources count her among the Horae, the Greek goddesses of the seasons. She is often associated with the goddess Auxesia, a figure linked with growth, who is likewise treated as an epithet of Persephone. The pair were worshipped in several communities around the Saronic Gulf, including Epidaurus, Aegina and Troezen.

Ancient writers tell different stories about the pair. Herodotus records that Epidaurus ended a famine by setting up olive-wood statues of the two goddesses on the advice of the Delphic oracle, and that the statues were later taken to Aegina, where they were honoured with sacrifices and satirical choruses of women. At Troezen, according to Pausanias, they were remembered instead as maidens from Crete who were stoned to death during a civil uprising and honoured with a festival called the Stoning. Pausanias, who saw the statues on Aegina, wrote that he sacrificed to them in the same way as at Eleusis.

== Etymology ==
The name Damia is derived from the Greek words for "earth" (da, dē or gē) and maia, "nursing mother", and is commonly translated as "Earth-Mother". The name of her counterpart Auxesia is described by the Theoi Project as that of a goddess of spring growth, and a nineteenth-century reference work calls her the goddess who grants growth and prosperity to the fields.

Some editions of Pausanias give the name of one of the Troezenian maidens as Lamia. The nineteenth-century Dictionary of Greek and Roman Biography and Mythology suggests that this may be only an incorrect reading of Damia.

== Myth ==
=== Epidaurus and Aegina ===
According to Herodotus, the land of Epidaurus once bore no produce. The Epidaurians consulted the oracle at Delphi, and the priestess told them to set up images of Damia and Auxesia made from the wood of the cultivated olive, not from bronze or stone. Because the olive trees of Athens were thought to be the holiest, the Epidaurians asked the Athenians for permission to cut some down. The Athenians agreed on condition that the Epidaurians pay yearly dues to Athena and Erechtheus. Once the images were set up, the land bore fruit again.

At that time the people of Aegina were subject to Epidaurus. After they began to build ships, they revolted, and during the conflict they took the images of Damia and Auxesia and set them up at a place called Oea. There they sought the favour of the goddesses with sacrifices and with female choruses that mocked in a satirical and abusive manner. Ten men were appointed to provide the chorus for each goddess, and the mockery was aimed at the women of the country rather than at men. According to Herodotus, the Epidaurians had the same rites, as well as certain secret rites.

Once the images were gone, the Epidaurians stopped paying their dues to Athens and told the Athenians to claim them from Aegina. The Aeginetans said they had nothing to do with the Athenians. Herodotus then gives two accounts. In the Athenian account, one trireme was sent to remove the images, which the Athenians regarded as made of Attic wood. When the crew tied cords around them and pulled, a thunderstorm and an earthquake drove the crew mad, and they killed one another until only one man returned to Phalerum.

The Aeginetans and Argives told it differently: Argives who had crossed secretly from Epidaurus attacked the Athenians and cut them off from their ships. Only one Athenian came home. According to the Argives he escaped after the rest were destroyed, while the Athenians attributed the disaster to divine power. The Aeginetans also said that the images fell to their knees as the Athenians dragged them and stayed that way afterwards. Herodotus says he does not believe this, though someone else might.

The wives of the men who had gone to Aegina were angry that the one survivor alone was safe, and they stabbed him with the brooch-pins of their garments. The Athenians then changed the women's dress from the Dorian style to the Ionian linen tunic, so that they would have no brooch-pins to use. The Argives and Aeginetans responded by making their brooch-pins half their former length, making brooches the main offering of women in the shrines of the two goddesses, and banning Attic goods, including pottery, from the temples.

=== Troezen ===
The Troezenians gave a different account. According to Pausanias, Damia and Auxesia were maidens who came from Crete. A general uprising broke out in the city, and the opposing faction stoned the two women to death. The Troezenians then paid them divine honours and held a festival in their memory, which Pausanias says they call Stoning. The festival is also known as the Lithobolia.

== Origin ==
The main ancient accounts of the cult come from Herodotus, a Greek historian of the fifth century BC, and Pausanias, a Greek travel writer of the second century AD. Pausanias chose not to retell the story of the Epidaurian famine and the Athenian expedition because Herodotus had already told it accurately and in detail, but he wrote that he saw the images and sacrificed to them in the same way as at Eleusis. Herodotus says the Epidaurians kept the same rites as the Aeginetans, as well as certain secret rites.

Several sources connect the pair with Demeter and Persephone. The Theoi Project states that Damia was a title of Demeter as goddess of the fertile earth, and Auxesia a title of her daughter Persephone as goddess of spring growth. The Byzantine lexicon known as the Suda equates them with Demeter and Kore, as quoted by Theoi, and the nineteenth-century Dictionary of Greek and Roman Biography and Mythology describes the Damia of the Troezenian story as probably Demeter.

The accounts also differ on the status of the pair. Herodotus describes images of Damia and Auxesia that were ordered by the oracle at Delphi and kept at Epidaurus and Aegina, while at Troezen, according to Pausanias, they were mortal maidens from Crete who were killed in a revolt and later honoured. Theoi says the Argives also described them as Cretan maidens who received divine status after being wrongly stoned by peasants.

The same nineteenth-century dictionary dates the separation of Aegina from Epidaurus, after which the Aeginetans took the statues, to about 540 BC. Because this is an older reference work, the date should be treated with caution.

== Epithets ==
Damia is recorded as a title of Demeter as goddess of the fertile earth, and Auxesia as a title of Persephone. The Byzantine lexicon known as the Suda gives the names in the forms Amaia and Azesia and equates them with Demeter and Kore.

In Athens, Pausanias writes, Auxo and Hegemone were worshipped as Graces, while Carpo (Καρπώ, fruit) was named as a Hora, or Season, and not as a Grace. According to the Theoi Project, Damia was probably the same goddess as Carpo, who was worshipped beside Auxo in Athens.

== See also ==
- Auxesia (mythology)
- Azesia
- Demeter
- Horae
- Lithobolia (festival)
- Persephone
