= Witchcraft in North America =

The views of witchcraft in North America have evolved through an interlinking history of cultural beliefs and interactions. These forces contribute to complex and evolving views of witchcraft. Today, North America hosts a diverse array of beliefs about witchcraft.

Indigenous communities such as the Cherokee, Hopi, the Navajo among others, included in their folklore and beliefs malevolent figures who could harm their communities, often resulting in severe punishments, including death. These communities also recognized the role of medicine people as healers and protectors against these malevolent forces.

The term witchcraft arrived with European colonists, along with European views on witchcraft. This term would be adopted by many Indigenous communities for those beliefs about harmful supernatural powers. In colonial America and the United States, views of witchcraft were further shaped by European colonists. The infamous Salem witch trials in Massachusetts, along with other witch hunts in places like Maryland and Pennsylvania, exemplified European and Christian fear and hysteria surrounding accusations of witchcraft. These trials led to the execution of numerous individuals accused of practicing witchcraft. Despite changes in laws and perspectives over time, accusations of witchcraft persisted into the 19th century in some regions, such as Tennessee.

The influences on Witchcraft in Latin America impacted North American views both directly and indirectly, including the diaspora of African witchcraft beliefs through the slave trade and suppressed Indigenous cultures adopting the term for their own cultural practices. Neopagan witchcraft practices such as Wicca then emerged in the mid-20th century.

== Native Americans in the United States ==
Native American communities such as the Cherokee, Chickasaw, Creek, Delaware, Hopi, Miami, Natchez, Navajo and Seneca have historically defined witches as evil-doers who harm their own communities. Witches are traditionally seen as criminals, and witchcraft as a crime punishable by death, if nothing else as a last resort. While some communities have passed laws specifically outlawing vigilante killings, traditional views of witches and witchcraft have largely remained the same into 20th century, and through to the present among traditionals. Alan Kilpatrick writes in The Night Has a Naked Soul: Witchcraft and Sorcery Among the Western Cherokee "A cursory survey of the ethnohistorical literature indicates that death was the standard punishment among Native American societies. Numerous eighteenth- and nineteenth-century accounts of random witch killings are recorded among the Chickasaw."

Witches in these communities are defined in contrast to medicine people, who are the healers and ceremonial leaders, and who provide protection against witches and witchcraft.

=== Cherokee ===
The Cherokee have traditional monster stories of witches, such as Raven Mocker (Kâ'lanû Ahkyeli'skï) and Spearfinger (U'tlun'ta), both known as dangerous killers.

Among the Cherokee, the medicine people are seen as a "priesthood caste", known to work together in groups to help the community. As in other Native communities, they are defined as the opposite of witches, who are seen as criminals,

In contrast, the traditional Cherokee witch lives alone, eats alone (fearful of being poisoned), and commits heinous acts alone, surreptitiously under the cover of darkness. Jealous and hypersensitive by nature, the Cherokee witch lives in the ever-fearful grip of being publicly exposed.

Cherokee healers have "doctored" dogs so the dogs can help them detect witches.

As in the other tribes that have agreed to talk to anthropologists, witchcraft has been traditionally punished by death in Cherokee communities. In 1824 the western Cherokee passed new laws "forbidding the wanton killing of suspected witches", however, this attitude and retribution appears to have continued at the same rate in both the Cherokee and Creek communities throughout the 19th Century. In the twentieth century, many communities responded to allegations of witchcraft with mental health treatment, including medication. But despite changes in laws and perspectives, Kilpatrick (quoting Shimony (1989)) wrote in 1998 that one does still occasionally read about "the demise of a suspected witch in Native American communities" but that most of these deaths take place "only while the witch is in animal guise (by shooting) or by means of counter-witchcraft".

=== Hopi ===
The Hopi have many beliefs and concerns about witches and witchcraft.

To the Hopis, witches or evil-hearted persons deliberately try to destroy social harmony by sowing discontent, doubt, and criticism through evil gossip as well as by actively combating medicine men.

Suspicious deaths are often blamed on witchcraft, with members of the community trying to figure out who might be a witch, and who might have caused the death or other misfortune.

They are called popwaqt, the plural of powaqa, "witch" or "sorcerer." They are unequivocally evil, casting spells, causing illness, killing babies, and destroying the life cycle. They practice powaqqatsi, the "life of evil sorcery." The Hopis call them kwitavi, "shit people."

....

a witch is a person who kills close family relatives in order to prolong his or her own life by four years. By killing, I mean causing through occult means an unnatural death, such as stillbirth, infants dying of ordinary illnesses, or healthy adults suffering from strange illnesses. Witches are also the occult cause of unusual circumstances, such as hailstorms on a sunny day, extreme drought, or people suffering bad fortune.

=== Navajo ===
There are several varieties of those considered to be witches by the Navajo. The most common variety seen in horror fiction by non-Navajo people is the yee naaldlooshii (a type of 'ánti'įhnii), known in English as the skin-walker. They are believed to take the forms of animals in order to travel in secret and do harm to the innocent. In the Navajo language, yee naaldlooshii translates to 'with it, he goes on all fours'. Corpse powder or corpse poison (Navajo: áńt'į́, literally 'witchery' or 'harming') is a substance made from powdered corpses. The powder is used by witches to curse their victims. Traditional Navajos usually hesitate to discuss things like witches and witchcraft with non-Navajos. As with other traditional cultures, the term "witch" is never used for healers or others who help the community with their ceremonies and spiritual work.

== British America and the United States ==
Witchcraft was a pressing issue during the early colonization of the United States. Witchcraft in the colonies was the alleged power one had to use supernatural abilities to influence people or events. In these early times, witchcraft was used to explain events that otherwise could not be understood. People were killed over these accusations when in reality they held no real merit at all. Though the Salem Witch Trials is the most commonly known case of witchcraft, it happened all over British North America. It was an epidemic in the United States that caused many to fear for their lives, whether they were being accused, or they were fearing those who were thought to be a part of it.

Many accused witches would be packed in local jails. In 1692, the royal governor of the Province of Massachusetts Bay, William Phips, created a special court in order to try the accused witches. The court was called the Court of Oyer and Terminer which means "to hear and determine". When the witches were being accused they were always guilty until proven innocent, rather than innocent until proven guilty. The presumption of being innocent is one of the key elements to a fair trial, which none of the accused were being given. Also, none of the witches were represented by counsel. They had no defense lawyers present which could have changed the trials drastically. When being accused of witchcraft, the accused were being stripped of even their basic rights that should have been granted under English law. The witchcraft that took place in early colonial America had an immense influence in law at the time and even today.

The Inquisition in Europe lasting from the twelfth through eighteenth centuries created widespread precedent for the persecution of witches in colonial America, and ran in parallel with the persecution of other groups deemed a threat to the Roman Catholic Church. Derived from papal authority and enforced through a collaboration of church and state, the judicial procedures embodied in the Inquisition were aimed at prosecuting heretics, among whom were initially the Catharists in southern France and the Waldensians in Germany and Italy. But by the emergence of the Spanish Inquisition in the late fifteenth century, Inquisitors targeted Conversos, Jews who had converted to Catholicism but were suspected of disloyalty to the faith. It was in this period that the Church began linking witchcraft to heresy, particularly in southwestern Germany where witch hunts intensified by the sixteenth and seventeenth centuries. It was, in fact, a German inquisitor and clergyman, Heinrich Kramer, who wrote the definitive bestseller on witchcraft and torture in 1486, Malleus Maleficarum, a book upon which other Inquisitors relied. It was not until the sixteenth century that the Inquisition fanned out to hold ex-Muslims and Lutherans accountable for suspected heresy, with the latter deemed the primary threat. Although witch hunts themselves had been a rarity in New England prior to the Salem Witch Trials, historians view these trials as coextensive with witch hunts emerging during the Inquisition.

=== Connecticut ===
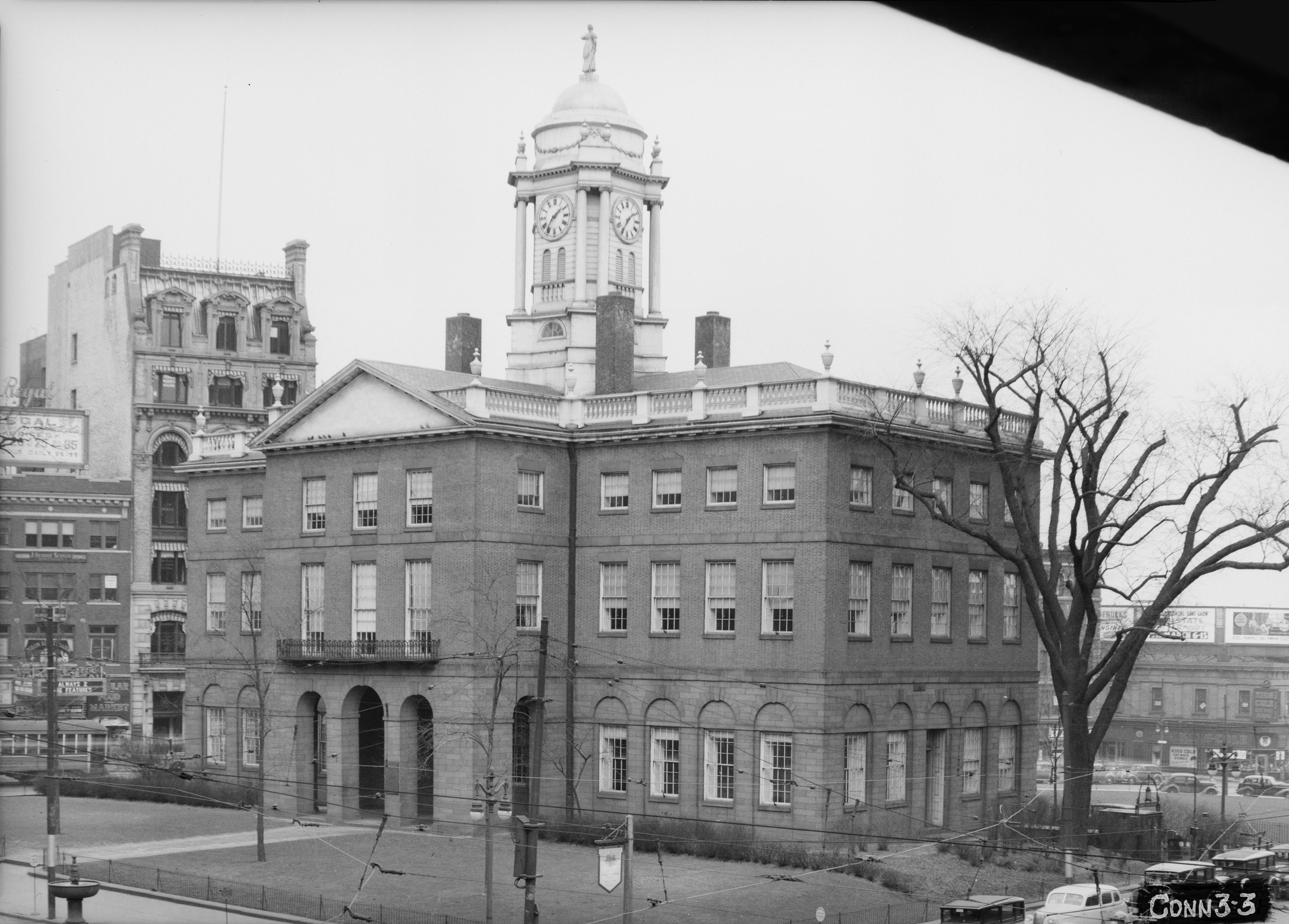
Photograph of the Old State House, Hartford, Connecticut, that was built in 1796. This was the site of Meeting House Square, possibly where Alse Young was hanged.

Alse Young was the first person on record to be executed for witchcraft in Colonial America. She was a resident of Windsor, Connecticut, and was hanged at a meetinghouse. Alse would be the first of many more who were condemned in Colonial America for witchcraft.

There was a woman who claimed to have seen her dead baby in a dream and was accused of witchcraft and ultimately killed. Connecticut's witch trials were among the first trials in New England, but often get overlooked by the more numerous and publicized trials that occurred after. Connecticut had over 40 witchcraft cases which resulted in 16 executions. Witchcraft in early colonial America was never overlooked because those who participated were thought to have an agreement with the devil, therefore choosing him over God and obtaining supernatural powers.

=== Massachusetts ===
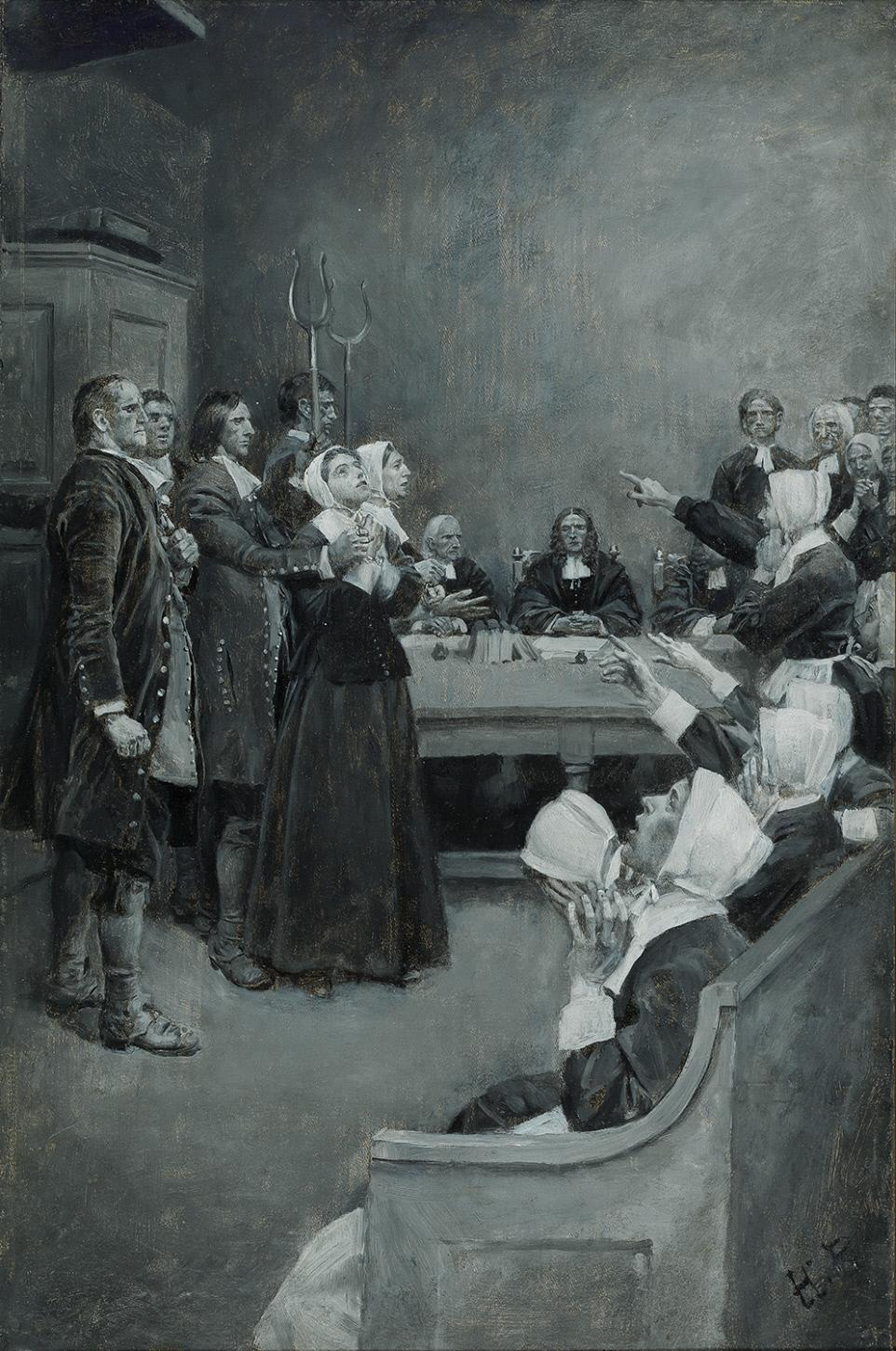
Alleged witches being accused in the Salem Witch Trials

In 1645, Springfield, Massachusetts, experienced America's first accusations of witchcraft when husband and wife Hugh and Mary Parsons accused each other of witchcraft. At America's first witch trial, Hugh was found innocent, while Mary was acquitted of witchcraft but sentenced to be hanged for the death of her child. She died in prison.

In 1648 Margaret Jones was the first person to be executed for witchcraft in Massachusetts Bay Colony. From 1645 to 1663, about eighty people throughout England's Massachusetts Bay Colony were accused of practicing witchcraft. Thirteen women and two men were executed in a witch-hunt that lasted throughout New England from 1645 to 1663. The Salem witch trials followed in 1692–93. These witch trials were the most famous in British North America and took place in the coastal settlements near Salem, Massachusetts. Prior to the witch trials, nearly three hundred men and women had been suspected of partaking in witchcraft, and nineteen of these people were hanged, and one was pressed to death for refusing to plead.

Despite being generally known as the Salem witch trials, the preliminary hearings in 1692 were conducted in a variety of towns across the province: Salem Village (now Danvers), Salem Town, Ipswich, and Andover. The best-known trials were conducted by the Court of Oyer and Terminer in 1692 in Salem Town. The Crucible by Arthur Miller is a dramatized and partially fictionalized story of the Salem witch trials that took place in the Massachusetts Bay Colony during 1692–93.

=== Maryland ===
In Maryland, there is a legend of Moll Dyer, who escaped a fire set by fellow colonists only to die of exposure in December 1697. The historical record of Dyer is scant as all official records were burned in a courthouse fire, though the county courthouse has on display the rock where her frozen body was found. A letter from a colonist of the period describes her in most unfavourable terms. A local road is named after Dyer, where her homestead was said to have been. Many local families have their own version of the Moll Dyer affair, and her name is spoken with care in the rural southern counties.

=== New Hampshire ===
Due to the same migration patterns as Massachusetts, the Puritans of New Hampshire were concerned with witchcraft. Eunice Cole was the only person indicted in New Hampshire for witchcraft. She was accused in 1656, 1673, and 1680

The Lithobolia is a story of an allegedly true 1682 event in New Castle, New Hampshire involving witchcraft.

=== New York ===
New York actually became a sanctuary for women accused of witchcraft since New York did not fall into the mass hysteria of accusing people of witchcraft. While New York was not a place of high and mass hysteria, they still had a few accusations. But New York was much more skeptical and had more critical thinking than most other states.

The first woman accused of witchcraft in New York was Katherine Harrison. She was jailed for about a year in Connecticut when she was first accused of witchcraft in 1669. Her husband then died, and she inherited a large sum of money. It is believed after her move her neighbors and towns people were jealous of her money and caused her of practicing dark arts. But she was never found guilty.

Another woman accused in New York was Elizabeth "Goody" Garlick, living during the 1650s in East Hampton, Long Island, would be accused of worse: witchcraft and causing the death of a 16-year-old neighbor who became ill due to a fever. Her case is well known today because of its gravity, and the role of mass hysteria the townspeople caused. Goody's accusations actually started thirty five years before the Salem witch trials. She was blamed for the teenagers' death, and eleven of her neighbors accused her of poisoning their breast milk, leading to babies getting sick. She was also accused of animal and livestock deaths.

Jane "Naut" Kanniff is thought to be the subject of New York's last witchcraft trial, in 1816. She was accused as a witch for wearing colorful clothing, she had a black cat and a talking parrot, and often collected herbs to soothe ailments. She was put to the test for the accusations by weighing her against the dutch bible. But since she was heavier than the Bible, she was considered not a witch.

Even though there was multiple accusations, the witch trials in New York were few and far between.

=== Pennsylvania ===
Margaret Mattson and another woman were tried in 1683 on accusations of witchcraft in the Province of Pennsylvania. They were acquitted by William Penn after a trial in Philadelphia. These are the only known trials for witchcraft in Pennsylvania history.

Some of Mattson's neighbors claimed that she had bewitched cattle. Charges of practicing witchcraft were brought before the Pennsylvania Provincial Council in February 1683 (under Julian calendar). This occurred nineteen years after the Swedish territory became a British common law colony and subject to English Witchcraft Act 1603. Accused by several neighbors, as well as her own daughter in law, Mattson's alleged crimes included making threats against neighbors, causing cows to give little milk, bewitching and killing livestock and appearing to witnesses in spectral form. On February 27, 1683, charges against Mattson and a neighbor Gertro (a.k.a. Yeshro) Jacobsson, wife of Hendrick Jacobsson, were brought by the Attorney General before a grand jury of 21 men overseen by the colony's proprietor, William Penn. The grand jury returned a true bill indictment that afternoon, and the cases proceeded to trial. A petit jury of twelve men was selected by Penn and an interpreter was appointed for the Finnish women, who did not speak English. Penn barred the use of prosecution and defense lawyers, conducted the questioning himself, and permitted the introduction of unsubstantiated hearsay. Penn himself gave the closing charge and directions to the jury, but what he told them was not transcribed. According to the minutes of the Provincial Council, dated February 27, 1683, the jury returned with a verdict of "Guilty of having the Comon Fame of a Witch, but not Guilty in manner and Forme as Shee stands Endicted."

Thus Mattson was found guilty of having the reputation of a witch, but not guilty of bewitching animals. Neither woman was convicted of witchcraft. "Hence the superstitious got enough to have their thinking affirmed. Those less superstitious, and justice minded, got what they wanted." The accused were released on their husbands' posting recognizance bonds of 50 pounds and promising six months' good behavior.

A popular legend tells of William Penn dismissing the charges against Mattson by affirming her legal right to fly on a broomstick over Philadelphia, saying "Well, I know of no law against it." The record fails to show any such commentary, but the story probably reflects popular views of Penn's socially progressive Quaker values.

=== Tennessee ===
Accusations of witchcraft and wizardry led to the prosecution of a man in Tennessee as recently as 1833.

=== Virginia ===
Colonial Virginia seemed a scary place that held spirits in its dark forests. When the colony's English settlers first came to the New World, they believed strongly in the devil's power. They believed Virginia Indians to be devil worshippers and were accusing one another of practicing witchcraft. Witchcraft in Virginia was less common compared to neighboring states, but nevertheless, evidence still shows that over two dozen trials were still taken place between 1626 and 1720. Judges were even administering water tests in order to find out if the accused were actually guilty or not. Records even show that the last witchcraft trial that took place on the mainland colonies happened in Virginia around 1730. Since then, the trials that occurred in Virginia are often forgotten as a key aspect of witchcraft in Colonial America.

== See also ==
- Colonial history of the United States
- List of people executed for witchcraft
- Modern witch-hunts
- Witch trials in the early modern period
