= Arctus =

Arctus may refer to:

- Arctus (crustacean) Dana, 1852, a genus of crustaceans in the family Scyllaridae
- Arctus Haan in Siebold, 1849, a genus of crustaceans in the family Scyllaridae, synonym of Scyllarus
- Arctus (centaur), one of those arrayed against the Lapiths on the Shield of Heracles in Greek mythology.
- Arctus, one of the Horae
- Arctus (mythology), various mythological figures known as Arctus or its variations.

== See also ==
- Arktos (disambiguation)
