= Arctic (disambiguation) =

The Arctic is Earth's north polar region.

Arctic may also refer to:

== Places ==
- Arctic, Rhode Island, United States; a village in West Warwick, Rhode Island
- Arctic Ocean

== Ships ==
- AHTS Arctic, a motor vessel, an anchor handling tug supply vessel, operated originally by Bourbon and latterly by Horizon Maritime
- CGS Arctic, a polar exploration screw steamer, a Canadian Government Ship that laid claims to part of the country's north, built in 1901 as Gauss, entering Canadian service in 1903 as Arctic, abandoned in 1925
- MV Arctic, an icebreaking bulk ship built in 1978 and was operated by Fednav
- List of ships named SS Arctic, various steam-powered ships by the name
- USS Arctic, various United States Navy ships of the name

== Other uses ==
- Arctic GmbH, a German manufacturer of computer hardware and consumer electronics
- Arctic S.A., a Romanian household appliances brand owned by Arçelik
- ARCTIC (ISS Facility), a temperature-controlled environment for storing biological samples on the International Space Station
- Arctic (journal), a quarterly multidisciplinary scientific journal about the northern polar and subpolar regions
- Arctic (film), a 2018 film directed by Joe Penna starring Mads Mikkelsen

== See also ==
- Tundra, a climate found in the Arctic, the Antarctic, and alpine regions
- Arctic Circle
- Arctic Cooperation and Politics
- Arctic Report Card
- Arctica (disambiguation)
- Antarctica (disambiguation)
- Antarctic (disambiguation)
- Arktos (disambiguation)
- Artic (disambiguation)
- Artik (disambiguation)
