= Auxesia =

Auxesia (Ancient Greek: Αυξησία), may refer to:

- Auxesia (mythology), a goddess
- Another name for Auxo, one of the Horae
- An epithet of Persephone
