= Elete =

Goddess of Praying time in Greek mythology

In Greek mythology, Elete (Ancient Greek: Ηλετη, romanized: Êletê) was the eight Hora (Hour) who presided over the hour of prayer, the first of the afternoon work hours. She was also called Telete (/ˈtɛlɪtiː/; Ancient Greek: Τελετή, romanized: Teletḗ, lit. 'consecration')

== Family ==
Elete was sister of the other eleven Hora: Anatole (Sunrise), Auge (First Light), Musica (Hour of Music), Gymnasica (Hour of Exercise), Nympha (Hour of Bath), Messembria (Noon), Sponde (Libations), Akte (Hour of Pleasure), Hesperis (Evening), Dysis (Sunset) and Arctus (Night Sky).

Their father was either Helios (Sun) or Chronos (Time).
