= Witch trials in New York =

New York witch trials

During the 17th through 19th centuries, there are at least thirty documented New York Witch Trials, hearings and prosecutions of people accused of witchcraft in the Province of New York. Several of the witchcraft cases in New York pre-dated the Salem witch trials.

== Witchcraft in New York ==
Witchcraft was a phenomenon that was of concern for colonial inhabitants of New Netherland (now New York). European settlers brought several superstitions with them to the New World, including their beliefs in the devil’s power, demons, and witches. During William Kieft's term as Director of New Netherland from 1638 to 1647, he expressed great animosity towards local Indigenous peoples and accused them of cursing him.

However, New York saw fewer witch trials than other early settlements due, in part, to the large Dutch influence in the province’s early history and the influence of New York’s Reformed Church community in opposing the practice of witch trials.

The entire history of witchcraft in New York is challenging to track, primarily due to the general lack of documentation from the accusations and trials, and the destruction of original records in the March 1911 fire at the New York State Capitol building.

As of 2012, four New York residents are listed as qualifying ancestors in the Associated Daughters of Early American Witches Roll of Ancestors.

== Prominent figures ==
=== Elizabeth "Goody" Garlick ===
In 1657–1658, Elizabeth "Goody" Garlick, a resident of East Hampton, was accused and tried for witchcraft following the mysterious death of a 16-year-old girl named Elizabeth, the daughter of Lion Gardiner, an English engineer and colonist who founded the first English settlement in New York. According to the court records, her trial had been for "some detestable and wicked Arts, commonly called Witchcraft and Sorcery, [you] did (as is suspected) maliciously and feloniously, practice at the said town of Seatalcott in the East Riding of Yorkshire on Long Island". The jury and magistrate, which included John Winthrop the Younger, found Garlick not guilty, but did find "grounds for suspicion". After the trial, Garlick continued to live in East Hampton with her husband.

=== Ralph and Mary Hall ===
In 1665, Ralph and Mary Hall of Setauket were accused of witchcraft and causing the death of their neighbor, George Wood, along with his child. A three-year witch hunt, investigations, and trials followed where the Halls found themselves fighting for their freedom and livelihoods in the court system, only to eventually be released and acquitted of all charges by order of Colonial Governor Richard Nicolls in 1668.

=== Katherine Harrison ===
In June of 1670, after being convicted of witchcraft in a trial in Wethersfield, Connecticut, Katherine Harrison moved to Westchester County, New York as an order of the court and with hopes of escaping the vandalism and demolishing of her property by neighbors. Shortly after, residents in Westchester complained about her presence and ordered her to leave the city, but once she was brought into court in June of 1670, the governor allowed her to live where she pleased. In early 1672, Harrison sued 11 of her neighbors for defamation of property.

=== Winifred Benham ===
In 1690s, Winifred King Benham and her daughter Winifred were thrice tried for witchcraft in Wallingford, Connecticut, the last of such trials in New England. Even though they were found innocent, they were compelled to leave Wallingford and settle in Staten Island.

=== Witch of Esperance ===
In the late 1700s, an unnamed woman known as the "Witch of Esperance", near Cobleskill, was a French woman residing in the town after her husband's death. She was accused of witchcraft by local residents and blamed for causing failed crops and livestock deaths. The woman did not speak English and was not able to defend herself against the accusations. Instead of charging her through the justice system, local villagers instead decided to shoot her through window as she prepared dinner one evening. Due to their belief that burying a witch under a tree could prevent her from "enacting revenge" on them in the afterlife, the woman was buried upside down in an unmarked grave under a pine tree on the north side of the village.

=== Jane Kanniff ===
Local Rockland County, New York historian Dr. Frank Bertangue Green published recollections of an oral history describing a witch trial that had occurred in the town of Clarkstown. According to Green's 1886 book, The History of Rockland County, Jane Kanniff, a twice-married widow and medicinal herbalist, became the target of witchcraft accusations after a series of incidents in which local housewives’ butter churned badly, and a cow failed to produce milk after being found standing in a wagon. According to Green, a witchcraft trial for Ms. Kanniff took place in around 1815 in a local mill, but no further outcome is recorded.

== Legacy ==
In 2017, the New York Historical Society, New York Folklore Society, and William G. Pomeroy Foundation erected a historical road marker dedicated to the "Witch of Pomerance". The story is also memorialized in an exhibit at the Esperance Historical Museum.

== See also ==
- List of people executed for witchcraft
- Witch trials in Connecticut
- Modern witch-hunts
- Witchcraft accusations against children
- Witch trials in the early modern period

=== General ===
- Colonial history of the United States
- List of wrongful convictions in the United States
- Moral panic
