= Gymnastica =

In Greek mythology, Gymnastica (Ancient Greek: Γυμναστικη, romanized: Gymnastikê, lit. 'gymnastics') or Gymnasia (/dʒɪmˈneɪzɪəm/), was the fourth Hora (Hour) who presided over the morning hour of education, training, gymnastics and exercise.

== Family ==
Gymnasia was sister of the other eleven Hora: Anatolia (Sunrise), Auge (First Light), Musia (Hour of Music), Nymphe (Hour of Bath), Messembria (Noon), Sponde (Libation), Elete (Hour of Prayer), Acte (Hour of Pleasure), Hesperis (Evening), Dysis (Sunset) and Arktos (Night Sky).

Their father was either Helios (Sun) or Chronos (Time).
