= Arctus (mythology) =

In Greek mythology, Arctus (Ancient Greek: Ἄρκτος, romanized: Árktos, lit. 'bear') may refer to the following:

- Arctus, one of the twelve Horae.
- Arctus, one of the centaurs who fought against the Lapiths during the wedding of Pirithous and Hippodamia.
- Arktos, the name of Callisto among the stars after being transformed by her lover Zeus into the constellation Ursa Major (‘The Great Bear’). Meanwhile, their son Arcas was changed and set into the sky as Arctophylax (‘The Bear Watcher’).
- Arctus, the son of Zeus and a woman named Manthea, whom he seduced in the form of a bear according to a Christian writer.
