= List of ships named SS Arctic =

SS Arctic may refer to the following steamships, several of which are screw-propelled, bearing the name Arctic:

- SS Arctic (1850), a trans-Atlantic sidewheel paddle steamship launched in 1850 and sunk in 1854
- SS Arctic (sunk 1860), a sidewheel steamer that sank in Lake Superior in 1860; see Huron Island Light
- SS Arctic (1859), a British steamship launched from Kingston-upon-Hull in 1859; see list of ship launches in 1859
- SS Arctic (1864), a screw steamer launched in 1864 and sunk in Lake Huron in 1893
- Arctic (1881), a Great Lakes icebreaking steam tug launched in 1881 and abandoned in 1930
- SS Arctic (1925), a cargo liner launched in 1903, named Arctic (1925–1937), scrapped in 1937
- SS Arctic (1913), a steam towboat launched in 1913, entering U.S. Navy service in 1917 as USS Arctic, leaving navy service in 1919, and scrapped in 1941

== See also ==
- SS Arctic disaster (27 September 1854)
- Arctic (disambiguation)
- USS Arctic
- CGS Arctic
