= Artic =

Artic or ARTIC may refer to:

== Places ==
- Artic, Washington, an unincorporated community

== Transportation ==
- Anaheim Regional Transportation Intermodal Center, a transit hub in Anaheim, California
- Articulated lorry, a common term for a semi-trailer truck
- Articulated bus, a type of bus
- Volvo Gran Artic 300, a proposed bi-articulated bus chassis manufactured by Volvo
- Škoda Artic, an articulated low-floor Transportation tram manufactured by Škoda Transtech Oy
- "Artic" is the radio call sign for Canadian North Airlines

== Other uses ==
- Art Institute of Chicago
- Artic Computing, a defunct video game developer

== See also ==
- Artik (disambiguation)
- Arctic (disambiguation)
