= Sponde (Hora) =

In Greek mythology, Sponde (/ˈspɒndiː/; Ancient Greek: Σπονδη, romanized: Spondê, lit. 'libations') was the seventh Hora (Hour) who presided over the hour of libations poured after lunch.

== Family ==
Sponde was sister of the other eleven Hora: Anatole (Sunrise), Auge (First Light), Musica (Hour of Music), Gymnasica (Hour of Exercise), Nympha (Hour of Bath), Messembria (Noon), Elete (Hour of Prayer), Akte (Hour of Pleasure), Hesperis (Evening), Dysis (Sunset) and Arctus (Night Sky).

Their father was either Helios (Sun) or Chronos (Time).
