= Auge (Hora) =

Greek goddess

In Greek mythology, Auge (/ˈɔːdʒiː/; Ancient Greek: Αὐγή, romanized: Augê, lit. 'sunbeam, daylight, dawn';), “Daybreak”, was the first Hora (Hour) who presided over the hour of the first light of day. She was not initially counted as part of this lesser known set of goddesses.

== Family ==
Auge was sister of the other eleven Horae: Anatole (Sunrise), Musica (Hour of Music), Gymnastica (Hour of Exercise), Nymphe (Hour of Bath), Mesembria (Noon), Sponde (Libation), Elete (Hour of Prayer), Acte (Hour of Pleasure), Hesperis (Evening), Dysis (Sunset) and Arctus (Night Sky).

Their father was either Helios (Sun) or Chronos (Time).
