= Acte (mythology) =

In Greek mythology, Acte (Ancient Greek: Ἀκτή, romanized: Aktê, lit. 'corn, meal'), also called Acme, was the ninth Hora (Hour) who presided over the hour of eating and pleasure, the second of the afternoon work hours.

== Family ==
Akte was sister of the other eleven Hora: Antolia (Sunrise), Auge (First Light), Musia (Hour of Music), Gymnasia (Hour of Exercise), Nymphe (Hour of Bath), Mesembria (Noon), Sponde (Libations), Elete (Hour of Prayer), Hesperis (Evening), Dysis (Sunset) and Arktos (Night Sky).

Their father was either Helios (Sun) or Chronos (Time).

== Namesake ==
Acte (Akte), also Actica, was the ancient name for Attica derived from its first ruler, Actaeus.
