= Hesperis (Hora) =

In Greek mythology, Hesperis (Ancient Greek: Ἑσπερίς, romanized: Hesperís, lit. 'evening') was the tenth Hora (Hour) who presided over the hour of dusk, the end of the afternoon work hours and start of evening.

== Family ==
Hesperis was sister of the other eleven Hora: Anatole (Sunrise), Auge (First Light), Musica (Hour of Music), Gymnasica (Hour of Exercise), Nympha (Hour of Bath), Messembria (Noon), Sponde (Libations), Elete (Hour of Prayer), Akte (Hour of Eating), Dysis (Sunset) and Arctus (Night Sky).

Their father was either Helios (Sun) or Chronos (Time).
