= Anatole (mythology) =

Figure in Greek mythology

In Greek mythology, Anatole (Ancient Greek: Ανατολη, romanized: Anatolê, lit. 'rising') was the second Hora (Hour) who presided over the hour of dawn. She was also called Anatolia or Antolia (Ἀντολίη means ‘eastern’).

== Family ==
Anatolia was sister of the other eleven Hora: Auge (First Light), Musica (Hour of Music), Gymnastica (Hour of Exercise), Nymphe (Hour of Bath), Mesembria (Noon), Sponde (Libation), Elete (Hour of Prayer), Acte (Hour of Pleasure), Hesperis (Evening), Dysis (Sunset) and Arctus (Night Sky).

Their father was either Helios (Sun) or Chronos (Time).

== Mythology ==
Antolia along with her sisters, Dysis, Mesembria and Arktos were the attendants of the goddess Harmonia (Harmony) within her halls in heaven. Like the rest of her siblings, she attended one of the four gates of the Winds.

"With hurrying shoe, she (i.e. Aphrodite) whizzed along the vault of heaven to the hall of Allmother Harmonia, where that nymph dwelt in a house, self-built, shaped like the great universe with its four quarters joined in one. Four portals were about that stronghold standing proof against the four winds. Handmaids protected this dwelling on all sides, a round image of the universe: the doors were allotted — Antolia was the maid who attended the East Wind's gate; at the West Wind's was Dysis the nurse of Selene; Mesembrias held the bolt of the fiery South; Arktos the Bear was the servant who opened the gate of the North, thick with clouds and sprinkled with hail. To that place went Charis, fellow-voyager with the Foamborn (i.e. Aphrodite), and running ahead she knocked at the eastern gate of Euros. As the rap came on the saffron portal of Antolia, Astynomeia an attendant ran up from within; and when she saw Cypris (i.e. Aphrodite) standing in front of the gatehouse of the dwelling, she went with returning feet to inform her mistress beforehand."

— Nonnus, Dionysiaca 41.275-293
