= D. antarctica =

D. antarctica may refer to:

- Deschampsia antarctica, the Antarctic hair grass, a flowering plant species native to Antarctica
- Dicksonia antarctica, the soft tree fern, man fern or Tasmanian tree fern, an evergreen tree fern species native to parts of Australia
- Durvillaea antarctica, a kelp species found in southern New Zealand and Chile

== See also ==
- Antarctica (disambiguation)
