= Musica (mythology) =

Mythological figure

In Greek mythology, Musica (Ancient Greek: Μουσικη, romanized: Mousikê, lit. 'music') or Musia, was the third Hora (Hour) who presided over the morning hour of music and study.

== Family ==
Musia was sister of the other eleven Hora: Anatole (Sunrise), Auge (First Light), Gymnastica (Hour of Exercise), Nymphe (Hour of Bath), Mesembria (Noon), Sponde (Libation), Elete (Hour of Prayer), Acte (Hour of Pleasure), Hesperis (Evening), Dysis (Sunset) and Arctus (Night Sky).

Their father was either Helios (Sun) or Chronos (Time).
