= Nymphe (Hora) =

In Greek mythology, Nymphe (Ancient Greek: Νύμφη, romanized: Nymphê, lit. 'bath') or Nympha, was the fifth Hora (Hour) who presided over the morning hour of ablutions (bathing, washing).

== Family ==
Nympha was sister of the other eleven Hora: Anatolia (Sunrise), Auge (First Light), Musia (Hour of Music), Gymnasia (Hour of Exercise), Messembria (Noon), Sponde (Libation), Elete (Hour of Prayer), Acte (Hour of Pleasure), Hesperis (Evening), Dysis (Sunset) and Arktos (Night Sky).

Their father was either Helios (Sun) or Chronos (Time).
