= Mesembria (mythology) =

Figure in Greek mythology

In Greek mythology, Mesembria (Ancient Greek: Μεσημβρία, romanized: Mesêmbria, lit. 'midday'), also spelled Messembria, was the sixth Hora (Hour) who presided over the hour of noon.

== Family ==
Messembria was sister of the other eleven Hora: Auge (First Light), Anatole (Sunrise), Musica (Hour of Music), Gymnastica (Hour of Exercise), Nymphe (Hour of Bath), Sponde (Libation), Elete (Hour of Prayer), Acte (Hour of Pleasure), Hesperis (Evening), Dysis (Sunset) and Arctus (Night Sky).

Their father was either Helios (Sun) or Chronos (Time).

== Mythology ==
Mesembria along with her sisters, Antolia, Dysis and Arctus, were the attendants of the goddess Harmonia (Harmony) within her halls in heaven. Like the rest of her siblings, she attended one of the four gates of the Winds.

"With hurrying shoe, she (i.e. Aphrodite) whizzed along the vault of heaven to the hall of Allmother Harmonia, where that nymph dwelt in a house, self-built, shaped like the great universe with its four quarters joined in one. Four portals were about that stronghold standing proof against the four winds. Handmaids protected this dwelling on all sides, a round image of the universe: the doors were allotted — Antolia was the maid who attended the East Wind's gate; at the West Wind's was Dysis the nurse of Selene; Mesembrias held the bolt of the fiery South; Arktos the Bear was the servant who opened the gate of the North, thick with clouds and sprinkled with hail."

— Nonnus, Dionysiaca 41.275-287
