= M. arctica =

M. arctica may refer to:

- Melangyna arctica, a hoverfly species found in Europe
- Marsupella arctica, the Arctic rustwort, a liverwort species found in the Northern Hemisphere

== See also ==
- Arctica (disambiguation)
