= Goody Bassett =

Connecticut woman accused of witchcraft (died 1651)

- Died: 15 May 1651; Stratford, Connecticut Colony
- Cause of death: Hanged
- Known for: victim of the witch trials in Connecticut
- Criminal charges: Witchcraft
- Criminal penalty: Death by hanging
- Criminal status: Executed
- Spouse: Thomas Bassett

Goody Bassett (died 15 May 1651) was a woman executed for witchcraft in the Connecticut Colony. The fourth of eleven executed witch hunt victims in the colony, Bassett's confession of there being a witch in Fairfield led to the arrest, trial, and execution of Goodwife Knapp.

== Biography ==
Little is known about Bassett's life or death, including her first name; the moniker "Goody" stemmed from the term "goodwife", a common way to refer to a married woman of low social standing in the Thirteen Colonies. Her name has been suggested as being Mary Paine Bassett, though this is not confirmed in any primary sources. Bassett was married to Thomas Bassett, a carpenter, and had previously lived in New Haven and Windsor before moving to Stratford by 1651.

=== Arrest, trial and execution ===
There is little evidence of Bassett's arrest and trial, including the evidence against her and who accused her. The only explicit mention of her being tried at all exists in the official record of the New Haven Colony, which noted in May 1651 that "the Governor, Mr Cullick and Mr Clarke are desired to go down to Stratford to keep court upon the trial of Goody Bassett for her life". Despite the lack of trial records, it is widely accepted that Bassett was subjected to a witch trial; the 1653 trial records of Goodwife Knapp for makes mention of Bassett having confessed to being a witch and subsequently hanged. There is also a consensus among historians that Bassett likely made a confession under torture, a common feature of witch trials in New England.

It is believed that Bassett's trial was overseen by John Haynes, one of the founders of the Connecticut Colony, alongside leaders from New Haven. Some contemporary sources have stated that Bassett had been accused of putting curses on people that caused physical pain, with others noting that people experienced hallucinations, illness and death shortly after the Bassetts moved to Stratford in 1651, though there is no clear evidence for such accounts. During the trial of Goodwife Knapp in 1653, it was reported that Bassett had suggested there was a witch in Fairfield, with her alleged to have said there were "others who hold their heads full high"; Bassett did not explicitly name Knapp and it is unknown if the women knew each other, though Bassett had previously lived in Fairfield.

Bassett was executed by hanging on 15 May 1651. Retrospective sources from the 19th century have alleged that Bassett attempted to cling to a boulder while being transported to the gallows, leaving "peculiar marks" on the stone. While Bassett is commonly assumed to have been executed in Stratford, the location of her death is disputed; it has been variously proposed that the site of the gallows is now the location of an exit of Interstate 95, behind an ice cream parlour, and in the vicinity of Phelps Mansion. Local records suggest Bassett's husband moved to Fairlfield following her death.

Bassett was the fourth woman executed for witchcraft in Connecticut, and the first in Fairfield County.

== Legacy and commemoration ==
In May 2023, the Stratford Historical Society held its inaugural Goody Bassett Ball. That same month, the Mayor of Stratford, Laura Hoydick, issued a proclamation recognizing Bassett for her "valuable contribution" to Stratford's history.

On 26 October 2023, Bassett was formally exonerated at a ceremony held in Stratford Green, 371 years after her death. The Stratford Historical Society had lobbied Stratford Town Council to issue a resolution for her exoneration to reverse what it described as a "historic injustice". Bassett has been described as a "relatively powerless scapegoat" who fell victim to "a community panic... likely whipped up by a baseless rumor".

Good Bassett's Ice Cream Shop, an ice cream parlour in Stratford, is named after Bassett.
