= Antarctic (disambiguation) =

The Antarctic is the high-latitude region enclosed by the Antarctic Circle.

It may also refer to:

== Places ==
- Antarctic Plate, a Earthly tectonic plate containing Antarctica
- Antarctica, a continent contained on the Antarctic Plate located in the Antarctic
- Antarctic Ocean, the ocean surrounding Antarctica
- Antarctic realm, a biogeographic region

== Other uses ==
- Antarctic Press, a comic book publisher
- Antarctic (magazine), a magazine published by the New Zealand Antarctic Society
- Antarctic (ship), a Swedish steamship used in polar exploration

== See also ==
- Antarctic Circle
- East Antarctic Shield, the craton of Antarctica
- France Antarctique, a short-lived French colony in Brazil
- Antarctica (disambiguation)
- Arctic (disambiguation)
