= Arktos =

Arktos may refer to:

- Arktos (book), a 1993 book by Joscelyn Godwin
- Arktos Media, a publishing company
- Arktos, a solo Arctic Circle expedition by Mike Horn
- Arktos, a character from the TV series Tabaluga

== See also ==
- Arctos, the Latin species word for a brown bear
- Arctus (disambiguation)
- Arctic (disambiguation)
