= Witch trials in Connecticut =

Witch trials occurring in Connecticut from 1647 to 1663

The witch trials in Connecticut, also sometimes referred to as the Hartford witch trials, occurred from 1647 to 1663. They were the first large-scale witch trials in the American colonies, predating the Salem Witch Trials by nearly thirty years. John M. Taylor lists a total of 37 cases, 11 of which resulted in executions. The execution of Alse Young of Windsor in the spring of 1647 was the beginning of the witch panic in the area, which would not come to an end until 1670 with the release of Katherine Harrison.

The history of witchcraft in Connecticut is difficult to track, owing primarily to the lack of documentation from the accusations, trials, and executions. Despite this, there is enough existing evidence to gain an insight into the culture of witchcraft trials at the time. In the early days of the trials, Reverends Samuel Stone of Hartford, Joseph Haynes of Wethersfield, and Samuel Hooker of Farmington served on a "prosecutorial tribunal" which contradicted the traditional idea that prosecutors should remain skeptical and immune to public pressure to convict. Thomas Welles was the Magistrate during the trials. As was the popular belief of the time, the magistrates of Connecticut relied on evidence of "the devil's involvement in inflicting harm" to secure a conviction of witchcraft, but such evidence could easily be found through "battering interrogations".

== Key figures ==
=== Alse Young ===
Alse Young was the first person executed for witchcraft not only in Connecticut, but likely in the whole of the American colonies. On May 26, 1647, she was executed in Hartford. Her execution was recorded in the journals of John Winthrop the governor of Massachusetts Bay; and Matthew Grant, the second town clerk of Windsor. There are no further surviving records on Young's trial or specification of the charges against her. Around the time of the trial, an influenza epidemic occurred throughout the New England area, including her hometown of Windsor, which may have influenced the accusations against her. Young was likely married or related to John Young of Windsor, and may have been eligible to inherit his property, which may have made her an even more attractive target.

=== Mary Johnson ===
Mary Johnson's was the first recorded confession of witchcraft. She worked as a house servant and was accused of theft in 1648. After extensive torture and interrogation, Johnson confessed to "familiarity with the devil". She also confessed to having sexual relations with "men and devils" and to murdering a child. Her execution was delayed as she was pregnant during her imprisonment in Hartford. Johnson was executed June 6, 1650.

=== Katherine Harrison ===
Katherine Harrison was a former maidservant of Captain John Cullick and the widow of Wethersfield's town crier. Harrison was born in England and came to America around 1651. She became a wealthy citizen of Wethersfield, Connecticut, after she inherited her husband's estate, worth one thousand pounds. Harrison experienced several legal problems, including the death of her livestock and the destruction of crops. Though her losses were supported by eyewitnesses, she received no compensation. In 1668, she was sued for slandering Goody Griswold.

Between 1668 and 1669, Harrison was also accused of witchcraft. The accusations against her included breaking the Sabbath, fortune-telling and using black magic, as well as appearing in spectral form to people. She was also accused of calling to the devil by the swamp. On May 11, 1669 she was moved to the local jail to await her trial. Harrison's trial faced many complications: the first jury never reached a decision, and the second found her guilty, but the magistrates disagreed as most of the evidence was spectral, which relied solely on the accuser. In May of 1670, Harrison was released from prison, and banished from the Connecticut colony; she and her family relocated to New York, as they had already planned to do.

=== Goodwife Knapp ===
Goodwife Knapp was a Fairfield woman who was accused of being the witch identified in the testimony of Goody Bassett, a woman who had confessed to being a witch and had been executed in 1651. Knapp maintained her innocence both before, during, and after her trial, and did not accuse anyone else of being a witch, stating she would not "render evil for evil". Knapp was executed in 1653.

== Major sites ==
=== Wethersfield ===
During the 1650s, several people were tried for witchcraft through the Connecticut area. In Wethersfield, Joan and John Carrington were executed in 1651. They were prominent members of the Wethersfield community before being accused of witchcraft. Wethersfield was also the home of Mary Johnson, the first open confessor of witchcraft; and Katherine Harrison. This resulted in the coining of the term "Wethersfield Witches" by historians.

=== Hartford ===
In the 1640s, the town of Hartford saw a surge in witch hysteria. A series of accusations were made among the townsfolk. The first accusation was by Anne Cole, who accused Rebecca Greensmith and Elizabeth Seager of tormenting her through magic. The parents of Elizabeth Kelly accused Goody Ayres of using black magic to kill their daughter. Other claims of black magic from Hartford were more peculiar: one person claimed Satan caused her to speak with an accent. Another said her neighbors transformed into animals at night. Katherine Branch, servant to the Wescot family, suffered from a series of fits and other instances that Daniel Wescot described as being "beyond nature", like elevating above her bed. A minister from a neighboring village claimed Branch's afflictions were the result of her declining to join a witch coven.

From Hartford, four people were executed for the crime of witchcraft. Nathaniel and Rebecca Greensmith, Mary Sanford, and Mary Barnes were hanged in 1662. Elizabeth Seager was accused of witchcraft, but the charges were dropped due to weak evidence.

== End of the trials ==
By 1663, the witchcraft trials in Hartford were beginning to wind down, due in no small part to the return of the governor of the Connecticut colony, John Winthrop Jr. Winthrop was generally regarded as "New England's quintessential adjudicator of witchcraft cases", due not only to his status as the son of the governor of Massachusetts, but also to his "first-hand knowledge of natural magical practices... associated with alchemy, a mystical form of chemical experimentation". Because of his experience with alchemy, and having seen John Dee and Robert Fludd – two major influences in Winthrop's studies – stand against false accusations of witchcraft, Winthrop often involved himself in witchcraft cases to ensure that the accused were not executed. His return and involvement in the trials ushered in a period of increasing skepticism towards accusations of witchcraft, and in 1669, it was Winthrop's court that established that multiple witnesses needed to bear witness to the same act of witchcraft simultaneously. This significantly stemmed the flow of accusations, and despite a minor panic during the Salem crisis later, no witches were executed in Connecticut after Katherine Harrison's release in 1670.

== Aftermath ==
On October 6, 2012, descendants of the executed petitioned the Connecticut government to posthumously pardon the victims, but the motion was not passed. In 2007, Addie Avery communicated with the British government in an attempt to acquit the convicted witches. Addie Avery was the descendant of Mary Sanford, who was executed for "dancing around a tree while drinking liquor". Avery has also been involved in many theatrical performances about the Connecticut witch trials, like The Witching Hour.

On February 6, 2017, the town of Windsor unanimously passed a resolution to symbolically clear the names of the town's two victims, Alice Young and Lydia Gilbert. A documentary about the passage of this resolution entitled Delayed Justice: Windsor Atones For Its Witch Trial History produced through Windsor Community Television can be accessed through Internet Archive. Several individuals arranged memorial services for the victims of the witch trials in Windsor in June 2017. The "Memorial For Connecticut's Witch Trial Victims" marked the 370th anniversary of Alse Young's execution.

On May 10, 2023, the Connecticut House of Representatives voted 121 in favor and 30 against, in order to exonerate 12 people who were convicted of witchcraft in the colonial era. On May 26, the Connecticut State Senate voted 33–1 to pardon the same group on the 376th anniversary of the first witch-hanging in New England, that of Alse Young.

== See also ==
- Salem witch trials
- Witch trials in New York
- Daemonologie
- Matthew Hopkins
