= Elizabeth Morse (Newbury witch trials) =

English-born American accused of witchcraft (1617–1690)

- Elizabeth Morses' historical marker, erected in 1999 by the Morse Society
- Born: Elizabeth Titcombe; July 20, 1617; Marlborough, Wiltshire, England
- Died: March 18, 1690 (aged 72); Newbury, Essex County, Massachusetts
- Other name: Witch of Newbury
- Occupation: Housewife
- Known for: Witch Trials
- Spouse: William Morse (m. c. 1632)
- Children: 13

Elizabeth Morse (née Elizabeth Titcombe; July 20, 1617 – March 18, 1690) was an English-born American colonial woman who was accused and convicted of witchcraft in 1680, from Newbury, Massachusetts in the Massachusetts Bay Colony. Her case is historically significant as one of the earlier witchcraft prosecutions in Massachusetts and illustrates the cultural and legal context that preceded the more famous Salem witch trials of 1692.

== Early life ==
Elizabeth Titcomb was born on July 20, 1617, in Marlborough, England, to Alice Wellman and Thomas Titcombe. She married circa 1632 William Morse (1618–1683), a shoe maker, in Newbury, Massachusetts. Her and her husband would have 13 children, between 1634 and 1656.

== Poltergeist disturbances ==
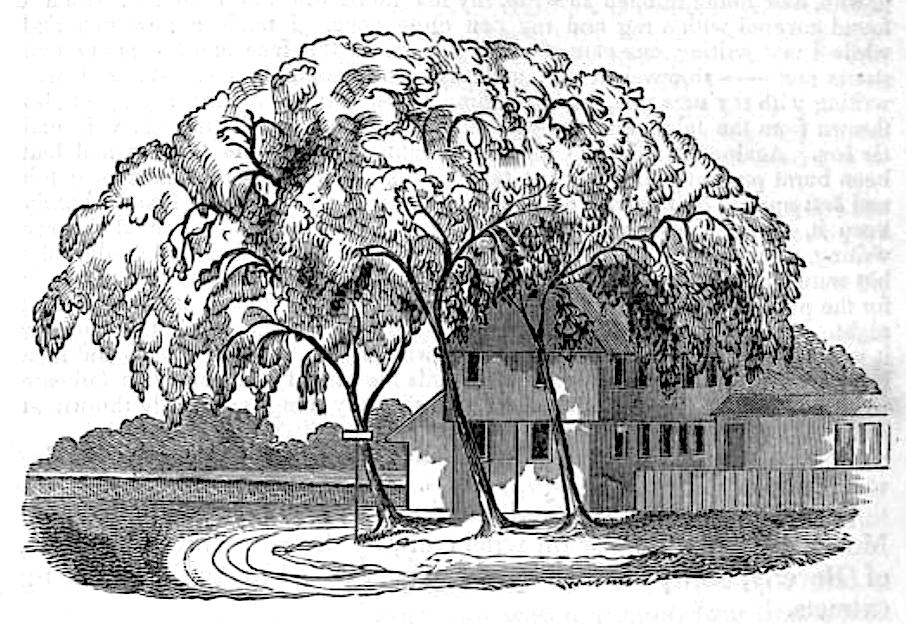
Engraving of the Morse House in Market Square in Newbury, Massachusetts

Her husband William Morse started to accuse someone else publicly of witchcraft in 1679, starting a series of accusations and sightings of supernatural things. When their grandson moved in with them, a boy named John Stiles, problems began to mount. Objects would disappear and come clattering down the chimney some short time later. William Morse found a large pig inside his house in the middle of the night and the couple would often awake to stones and branches hitting the sides of their house, with no one outside when they looked. William Morse initially accused a man named Caleb Powell of practicing the witchcraft that afflicted his property but Powell was later acquitted.

== Arrest and trial ==
The people of Newbury, unsatisfied, figured if he was not the witch, someone else had to be, and the old woman living on the property was the easy target. Seventeen people came forward to testify against her once she was accused. Zechariah Davis said that after he had failed to remember several times to bring Elizabeth some quills he had promised her, she was offended by his carelessness and told him so. When he returned home, three of his calves began having seizures and eventually died. He concluded that the previously healthy animals had been put under a spell.

Elizabeth Morse was convicted in May 27, 1680, and convicted for "not having the fear of God before her eyes, being instigated by the Devil and had familiarity with the Devil". She was ordered to be hung, but was given reprieve until October.

== Aftermath and later life ==
She was imprisoned in Boston and members of the colonial government wrote about how they could not believe she had not been executed yet. Her husband petitioned the court, offering to refute all seventeen witnesses. In 1681, more testimony was heard, and she was allowed to go home by May 1681. She was kept there until her death in 1690.

== See also ==
- Lithobolia
- Margaret Jones
- Ann Glover
