= Goodwife Knapp =

Connecticut woman accused of witchcraft (1605–1653)

- Born: 1605
- Died: 1653 (aged 47–48); Fairfield, Connecticut Colony
- Cause of death: Hanged
- Known for: victim of the witch trials in Connecticut
- Spouse: Richard Knapp

Goodwife Knapp (c. 1605 – 1653), also known as Goody Knapp, was a woman hanged for witchcraft in 1653 in the Connecticut Colony. One of eleven executed witch hunt victims in the colony, Knapp was notable for never confessing to being a witch and for not naming any other women during her trial.

== Biography ==
Not much is known about Knapp's life, including her name. She was married to Roger Knapp, who had settled in New Haven before 1638 and later moved to Fairfield. The Knapps had three children – Jonathan, Josiah and Lydia.

Knapp was variously described as a "woman of good repute" and a "just and high-minded old lady"; conversely, she was also described in some sources as a "simple-minded woman" who was regarded to with "contempt" by townspeople in Fairfield.

== Arrest, trial and execution ==
Knapp's case is one of the most well-documented witch trials in Connecticut, likely due to its relative high profile; among the magistrates were John Davenport, one of the founders of New Haven, and Roger Ludlow, the deputy governor of the Connecticut Colony and the Massachusetts Bay Colony.

In 1561, Goody Bassett, an accused witch from Stratford, was executed after confessing to being a witch. During her trial, she had alleged that there was "another witch in Fairfield that held her head full high". It is unclear what specifically led to Knapp being accused of being the Fairfield witch identified by Bassett; it has been suggested that she was targeted by Ludlow because she had refused to accuse Goodwife Staples, the wife of Ludlow's political rival, Thomas Staples, of being a witch.

Knapp was arrested and tried for being a witch in New Haven. Knapp consistently denied the charges against her, both following her arrest, during her trial, and after her sentencing. A midwife, Goody Odell, and Luce Pell, the wife of a local surgeon, examined Knapp's body for which marks, concluding that she had "witch's teats". Numerous people testified against her, including Goodwife Staples, whose testimony against Knapp was described as being damning. Knapp was found guilty of being a witch, and sentenced to death; she was reported to have been "hysterical" at the verdict, but said that she would "whisper" any confessions she did have at the gallows.

Awaiting execution, Knapp refused to name another witch; it was suggested that she continued to be pressured to name Goodwife Staples. While some sources alleged that Knapp had told a story from her cell of Staples telling her she had met a Native American in the woods who had showed her two gods that "shone brighter than day", implicitly suggesting that Staples was a witch, most sources maintain that Knapp never named another witch. A commonly attributed quote to Knapp stated, "I apprehend that Goodwife Staples has done me some wrong in her testimony, but I must not render evil for evil... I have sins enough already, and I will not add this to my condemnation". She reported that she did not know Staples and hoped she was an "honest woman".

Knapp was hanged in 1653. Following her death, her body was checked for marks of the devil, none of which were identified. Among those who examined her body was Staples, who, despite being one of Knapp's accusers, was understood to have changed her mind following her trial, stating "there were naught but such [marks] as she herself or any woman had". Ludlow would later claim that Knapp had told him at the gallows that Staples was a witch; this incensed Thomas Staples, who attempted to have Ludlow arrested for libel. Ludlow left the colonies for England and never returned.

== Legacy ==
Knapp was among eleven people executed for witchcraft in the Connecticut Colony between 1647 and 1663. Her refusal to name other witches during her trial has been attributed to the relatively low number of executions in Connecticut compared to the neighboring Massachusetts Bay Colony.

In 2019, a memorial for Knapp was unveiled at the Burroughs Community Center in Black Rock, Bridgeport, which stands on the site of Knapp's execution. A memorial service was led by David Spollett, pastor of the First Church Congregational; the church's first pastor had escorted Knapp to the gallows. Representatives from the Black Hat Society, a collective of Connecticut witches, also attended the ceremony.

Beverly Kahn, a descendent of Knapp, testified before the Connecticut General Assembly's Judiciary Committee supporting a resolution that would officially pardon Knapp and others accused of witchcraft in colonial Connecticut. In May 2023, the resolution was passed, pardoning Knapp.
