= Artik (disambiguation) =

Artik may refer to:

- Artik (Armenian: Արթիկ), Shirak, Armenia; a town
  - Artik BC, a basketball team in Artik, Armenia
- Diocese of Artik, southern Shirak, Armenia; of the Armenian Apostolic Church
- Artik (film), 2019 U.S. horror film
- Artik (band), a Russian band headlined by Anna Asti

== See also ==
- Artic (disambiguation)
- Arctic (disambiguation)
