= Arthur Cook (Pennsylvania politician) =

American judge (died 1699)

Arthur Cook (or Cooke) (1636 – 1699) was a colonial Rhode Island and Pennsylvania politician whose various offices included service as a justice of the Supreme Court of Pennsylvania, assuming office on July 14, 1685, and serving as chief justice from 1686 to 1690.

Cooke was a member of the Rhode Island General Assembly in 1681 and 1683, thereafter moving to Bucks County, Pennsylvania. There, he was a justice of the peace and member of the provincial council from 1686 to 1688, and a member of the Pennsylvania General Assembly in 1689, where he served as its speaker. He then returned to his positions as justice of the peace and member of the provincial council from 1690 to 1692. He was also a commissioner of the state of Pennsylvania in 1688, a justice of the peace of Philadelphia County, Pennsylvania, in 1690, 1692, and 1695, and a commissioner of property for the state of Pennsylvania in 1694.

In 1686, Cooke of received a patent for 2,000 acres, which lay in part along the northwest line of the township of Frankford, on what is now the Dublin road. On his death in 1699, "his widow and executrix, Margaret Cooke, and his son, John, conveyed 1,000 acres to Clement and Thomas Dungan, settlers in the township".

== In popular culture ==
In July 1682, he was visiting Great Island, New Hampshire along with the Deputy Governor of Rhode Island, Walter Clark, where they were witnesses to the Lithobolia, or stone-throwing devil.
