= Elizabeth Garlick =

Elizabeth "Goody" Garlick was a resident of East Hampton, Long Island, who was accused of witchcraft in 1657. Her case is a significant one in the history of witchcraft accusations in North America, predating the more famous Salem witch trials by several decades. The accusation stemmed from the death of 16-year-old Elizabeth Howell, the daughter of prominent citizen Lion Gardiner and wife of prominent resident Arthur Howell.

In February, 1658, 16-year old Elizabeth Gardiner Howell, who had recently given birth to a child, fell ill. During the illness, Elizabeth reportedly suffered from nightmares and claimed she saw a "black thing at the bed's feet" and that Garlick stood by her bed at night “ready to pull me in pieces.” As friends ministered to her, she was reported to have shrieked in hysteria: "A witch! A witch! Now you are come to torture me because I spoke two or three words against you!”

Following Elizabeth's death, local magistrates launched an investigation. Several of Goody Garlick's other accusers claimed that she employed black magic to harm people and livestock. Garlick was also accused of performing “works above the course of nature to the loss of lives of several persons.” Goodwives Edwards and Davis blamed Garlick for causing their children to fall ill, while additional witnesses attributed the death of two other children to her malignant power.

In the spring of 1658, Elizabeth Garlick traveled from her home on Long Island (which was under Connecticut's jurisdiction at the time), to stand trial in Hartford for witchcraft. The record of the trial—on May 5, 1658, about three months after Elizabeth Gardiner Howell's death—is brief. Goody Davis testified that Garlick was responsible for the death of one of her children. However, during the trial both Jeremiah and Katherine Vaile, servants of Lion Gardiner, challenged her assertion, reporting that they heard the Gardiner say that “Goody Davis had taken an Indian child to nurse & for lucre [profit] of a little wampum [valuable shell beads] had merely starved her own child.” The court was headed by Connecticut Governor John Winthrop the Younger, and the indictment was severe: “Elizabeth Garlick…that not having the fear of God before thine eyes thou hast entertained familiarity with Satan the great enemy of God and mankind, and by his help since the year 1650 have done works above the course of nature to the loss of lives of several persons (with several other sorceries) and in particular the wife of Arthur Howell of East Hampton, for which both according to the laws of God and the established law of this commonwealth thou deserveth to die.”

After hearing testimony, the jury reached a verdict of not guilty, and the court duly released her from custody. Her husband, however, had to enter a bond of thirty pounds to ensure that he and his wife would “carry good behavior to all the members of this jurisdiction” and appear before the next court held at Easthampton, so it could confirm that Garlick had not been a source of disorder. Though her date of death was not recorded in local records, Elizabeth Garlick was buried at the South End Burying Ground in East Hampton.
