= ARCTIC (ISS Facility) =

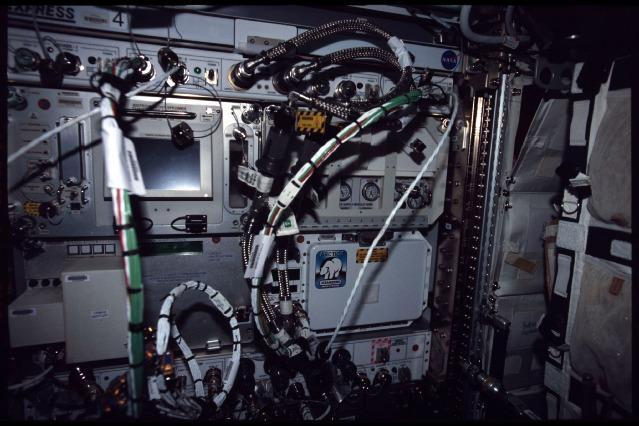
ARCTIC-1 and ARCTIC-2 units installed in EXPRESS rack 4 during Expedition 5.

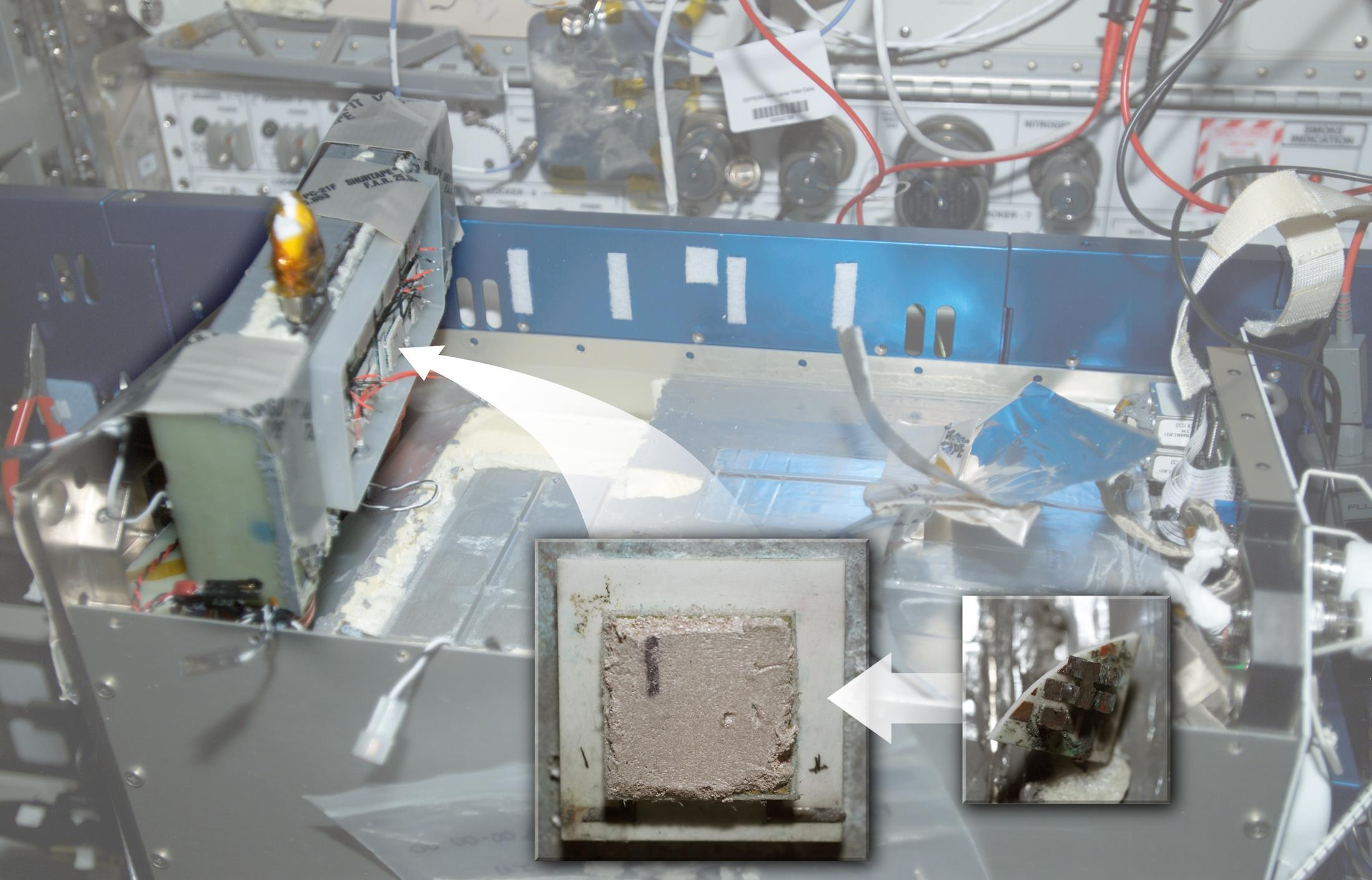
The disassembled ARCTIC-1 unit. The inset images show the corroded thermoelectric elements inside the ARCTIC.

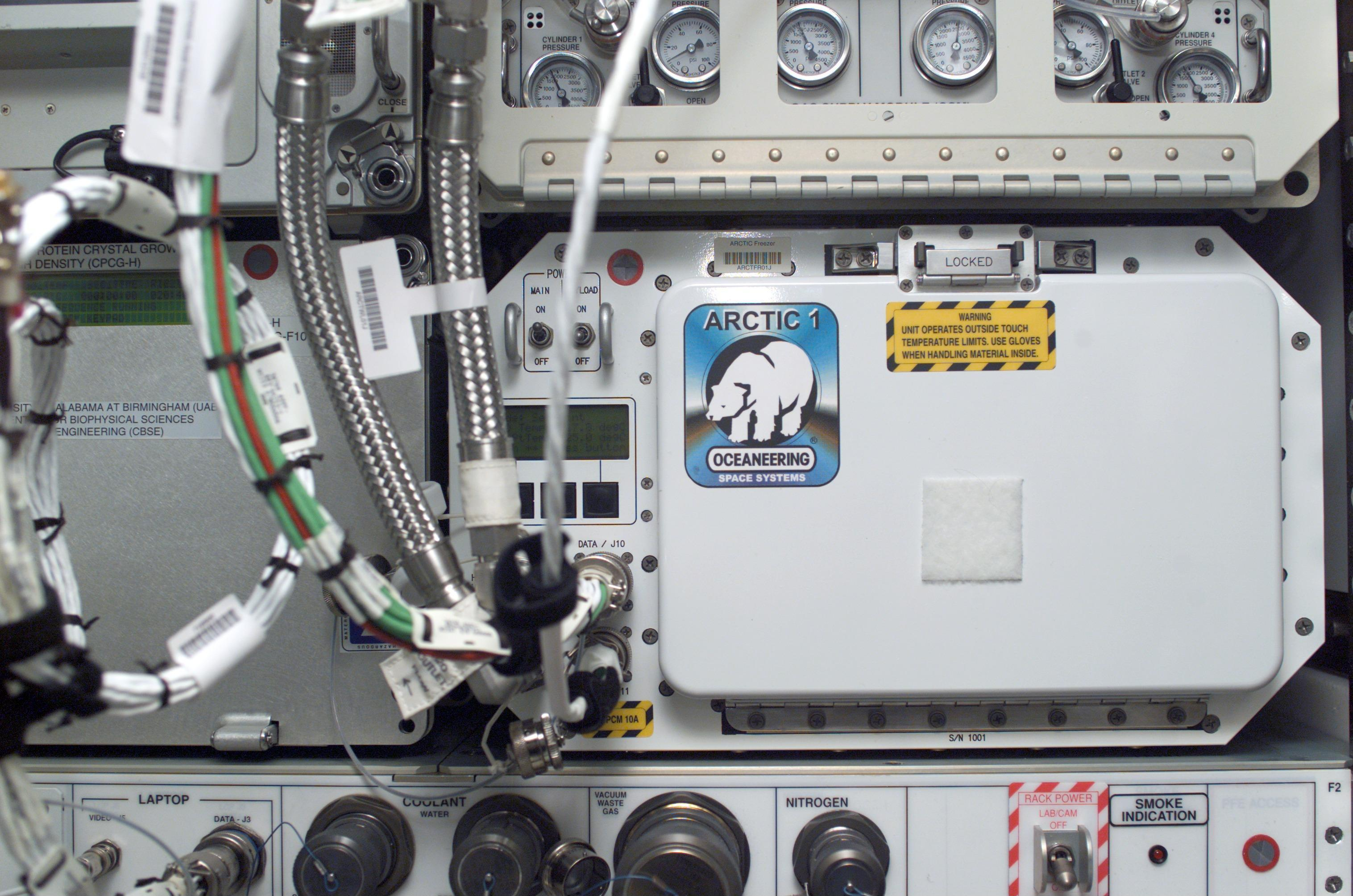
Overall horizontal view of the Advanced Thermoelectric Refrigerator/Freezer (ARCTIC) 1 unit installed in Expedite the Processing of Experiments to the Space Station (EXPRESS) Rack 4. Unit connectors and cables are visible.

The ARCTIC refrigerator/freezer (ARCTIC) provided a thermally-controlled environment for storing biological samples prior to their return to Earth in the early stages of the International Space Station (ISS). The ARCTIC freezers supported several of these experiments on ISS during Expeditions 4 and 5.
