= Arctica (disambiguation) =

Arctica was an ancient continent that formed in the Neoarchean era.

Arctica or Arktika may also refer to:

- Arctica (bivalve), a bivalve genus in the family Arcticidae
- "Arctica" (song), a single by Amberian Dawn
- 1031 Arctica, a dark asteroid
- Arktika (1972 nuclear icebreaker)
  - Arktika-class icebreakers, a class of Soviet and later Russian nuclear icebreakers
- Arktika (2016 nuclear icebreaker), a Project 22220 icebreaker
- Arktika 2007, a Russian expedition involving a crewed descent to the ocean bottom at the North Pole
- Azimut Hotel Murmansk or Artika, a hotel in Russia
- Fratercula arctica, the Atlantic puffin or common puffin, a species of seabird in the auk family
- Physaria arctica, a perennial flowering herb in the family Brassicaceae
- Salix arctica, the Arctic willow, a creeping willow in the family Salicaceae
- Trivia arctica, a marine gastropod mollusc in the family Triviidae

== See also ==
- Sonata Arctica, a Finnish power metal band
- Arctic (disambiguation)
- Antarctica (disambiguation)
