= Eunice Cole =

American colonist

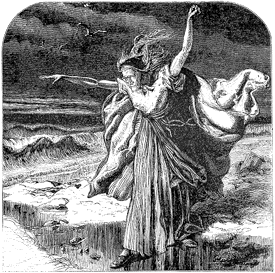
- Eunice Cole in "The Wreck of the Rivermouth" from The Poems of John Greenleaf Whittier (1879)
- Born: c. 1590; Kingdom of England
- Died: October 1680; Hampton, Province of New Hampshire

Court record from the witchcraft prosecution of Eunice Cole in 1673. Massachusetts Archives Collection, Vol. 135, No. 9

Eunice Cole (c. 1590, England – October 1680, Hampton, New Hampshire, United States), maiden name unknown, was a woman from the coast of New Hampshire. Better known as "Goody Cole", she is the only woman convicted of witchcraft in New Hampshire.

== Family ==
Her husband was William Cole. There are no records of this union producing children, although since they came to the United States when they were already well past childbearing age, it is certainly possible that they had children in England. Both of them were indentured servants of Matthew Craddock, a wealthy London merchant. After their service with Craddock was over, the Coles were released from Craddock's service and came to New England with their passage furnished, for £10. In Boston they were granted 2 acres (8,100 m^{2}) of land in Mount Wollaston (now Quincy), Massachusetts on February 20, 1637, though they left for Exeter, New Hampshire, before the end of the year. Both of the Coles were followers of Reverend John Wheelwright, who believed in antinomianism. Very soon after, they moved to neighboring Hampton, New Hampshire, receiving a 40-acre (160,000 m^{2}) parcel of land. The 5-acre (20,000 m^{2}) house lot was situated slightly east of where the Baptist church stands today on Winnacunnet Road. The other 35 acres (140,000 m^{2}) was a good source of income, considering William Cole was a carpenter. He died on May 26, 1662.

== Witchcraft accusations and death ==
Cole was formally accused of witchcraft three times, the first in Boston in 1656 when several townspeople testified against her. She was imprisoned until 1660, but was released until 1662 when she was returned to prison until sometime between 1668 and 1671. She was eventually acquitted, despite the "just ground of vehement suspicion" of her guilt. She was accused again in 1673, but acquitted, and once again in 1680, and although she was not indicted, she was still kept in prison.

Upon her death in 1680, she was hastily buried in an unmarked grave in Hampton; its precise whereabouts are unknown, although it is believed to be near the site of today's Tuck Museum. Local legends suggest that a stake was driven into her body after her death "in order to exorcise the baleful influence she was supposed to have possessed", and a horseshoe hung on the stake, just to be on the safe side. Goody Cole was much maligned – Hampton historian Joseph Dow referred to her as "ill-natured and ugly, artful and aggravating, malicious and revengeful" – but certainly not a witch.

== Goody Cole in the 20th century ==
In anticipation of the 300th anniversary of the town of Hampton in 1938, people organized in 1937 to clear Cole's name, forming "The Society in Hampton Beach for the Apprehension of Those Falsely Accusing Eunice (Goody) Cole of Having Familiarity With the Devil" – usually shortened to "The Goody Cole Society". A doll in her image was made and sold locally.

In 2003, a barbecue restaurant opened in Exeter with the name "Goody Cole's Smokehouse", relocating in 2006 to Brentwood, New Hampshire.

== In literature ==
John Greenleaf Whittier tells Cole's tale in his poem, "Wreck at Rivermouth".

== See also ==
- Margo Burns
- Mount Wollaston
- Salem witch trials
- Margaret Krieger
- Lithobolia

== Bibliography ==
- Demos, John Putnam. Chapter 10: "From Generation to Generation", pp. 313–339 in Entertaining Satan: Witchcraft and the Culture of Early New England, Oxford University Press, New York, 1982. ISBN 0-19-503378-7
- Hall, David D. Chapter 14: "Vehement Suspicion: Eunice Cole of Hampton (1656–1680)", pp. 213–229 in Witch-Hunting in Seventeenth Century New England: A Documentary History 1638–1695. 2nd edition. Northeastern University Press, Boston, 1999. ISBN 1-55553-415-5
