= Auxesia (mythology) =

Goddess from Greek mythology

Auxesia (Ancient Greek: Αυξησία) was in Greek mythology the goddess who grants growth and prosperity to the fields, sometimes distinct and sometimes an epithet of the goddess Persephone. Her name is the Greek word for "increase". She is often associated with the similar goddess Damia, as the pair together -- similar to the pair of Demeter and Persephone -- were worshipped in several communities across the Saronic Gulf, though in some communities they may have been worshipped more as heroes than genuinely divine goddesses. Auxesia was possibly simply a variant name of Azesia.

Their cults and rituals involved choruses of women exchanging verbal abuse or speaking indecently to one another, similar to various Demeter cults. In some places these choruses were secret and no men were permitted, while in others they were public, and trained by men, as at Aegina, where each chorus was trained and overseen by a group of ten male choregoi. Modern scholars generally take this to indicate that the cult had a magical formulae consisting of sexual language intended to arouse or awaken the fertility of the earth.

== Myth ==
According to a Troezenian legend, there came once during an insurrection at Troezen two Cretan maidens, Auxesia and Damia, whom some writers assume was a disguised Demeter, and who, in editions of the ancient geographer Pausanias, is called Lamia (though perhaps this is only an incorrect reading for Damia). During the tumult, the two maidens were stoned to death, whereupon the Troezenians paid divine honors to them, and instituted the festival of the Lithobolia, a stone-throwing rite of symbolic battles between participants.

According to an Epidaurian and Aeginetan tradition, the country of Epidaurus was afflicted with famine, and the Delphic oracle advised the Epidaurians to erect statues of Auxesia and Damia, which were to be made of olive wood. The Epidaurians therefore asked permission of the Athenians to cut down an Attic olive tree. The request was granted, on the condition that the Epidaurians should annually offer sacrifices to Athena Agraulos and Erechtheus. When the condition was complied with, the country of Epidaurus again bore fruit as before.

When around 540 BCE Aegina separated itself from Epidaurus, which had till then been regarded as its metropolis, the Aeginetans, who had sacred traditions in common with the Epidaurians, took away the two statues of Auxesia and Damia, and erected them in a part of their own island called Oea, where they offered sacrifices and celebrated mysteries. When the Epidaurians, in consequence of this, ceased to perform the sacrifices at Athens, and the Athenians heard of the statues being carried to Aegina, they demanded them back from the Aeginetans.

The islanders refused, and the Athenians threw ropes around the sacred statues to drag them away by force. But, according to legend, thunder and earthquakes ensued, and the Athenians engaged in the work were seized with madness, in which they killed one another. Only one of them escaped to carry back to Athens the news.

The Aeginetans added to this legend that the statues, while the Athenians were dragging them down, fell upon their knees, and that they remained in this attitude ever after.

== Retroactive history ==
Some of this myth was used by the historian Herodotus to explain the "ancient enmity" between Aegineta and Athens, which persisted into his time, and even goes so far as to use it to justify the state of modern fashion in these cities. According to him, the lone surviving Athenian sailor, on returning to Athens, was stabbed to death with the brooch pins of the dead sailors' widows, causing the Athenians to forbid women from wearing the peplos with its large brooches and instead start wearing the chiton with smaller brooches. The Aeginetan women, by comparison, celebrated the event by wearing even larger brooches than before.
