= Artic, Washington =

Unincorporated community in Washington, US

- Unincorporated community
- Location within Washington (state) Location within the United States
- Coordinates: 46°53′20″N 123°42′53″W
- Country: United States
- State: Washington
- County: Grays Harbor
- Established: 1887
- Elevation: 154 ft (47 m)
- Time zone: UTC-8 (Pacific (PST))
  - Summer (DST): UTC-7 (PDT)
- Area code(s): 360, 564
- GNIS feature ID: 1510790

Artic is an unincorporated community in Grays Harbor County, in the U.S. state of Washington.

== History ==
A post office called Artic (Note: The name of the community is often spelled as Arctic, depending on the source.) was established in 1887, and remained in operation until July 31, 1907. The community was named for Arta Saunders. A recording error by postal officials accounts for the error in spelling, which was never corrected.

Clark's Restaurant, a diner serving American cuisine, opened in 1960 at a former Artic gas station. Its hamburger was named one of the best in the United States by author George Motz.
