= Arctus (Hora) =

Greek goddess

In Greek mythology, Arctus (Ancient Greek: Ἄρκτος, romanized: Arktos, lit. 'bear') was the twelfth Hora (Hour) who presided over the night sky and constellations. She was originally not part of this lesser-known group of goddesses.

== Family ==
Arctus was sister of the other eleven Horae: Auge (First Light), Anatole (Sunrise), Musica (Hour of Music), Gymnastica (Hour of Exercise), Nymphe (Hour of Bath), Mesembria (Noon), Sponde (Libation), Elete (Hour of Prayer), Acte (Hour of Pleasure), Hesperis (Evening), and Dysis (Sunset).

Their father was said to be either Helios (the Sun god) or Chronos, (the personification of Time).

== Mythology ==
Arktos along with her sisters, Antolia, Dysis and Mesembria, attended of the goddess Harmonia (Harmony) within her halls in heaven. Like of her siblings, she guarded one of the four gates of the Winds.

"With hurrying shoe, she (i.e. Aphrodite) whizzed along the vault of heaven to the hall of Allmother Harmonia, where that nymph dwelt in a house, self-built, shaped like the great universe with its four quarters joined in one. Four portals were about that stronghold standing proof against the four winds. Handmaids protected this dwelling on all sides, a round image of the universe: the doors were allotted — Antolia was the maid who attended the East Wind's gate; at the West Wind's was Dysis the nurse of Selene; Mesembrias held the bolt of the fiery South; Arktos the Bear was the servant who opened the gate of the North, thick with clouds and sprinkled with hail."

— Nonnus, Dionysiaca 41.275-287
