= Lithobolia =

1698 narrative piece by Richard Chamberlayne

Lithobolia: or, the Stone-Throwing Devil is a 7,000-word narrative folk tale by Richard Chamberlayne first printed in London in 1698. It is considered an early example of esoteric literature and supernatural horror writing, and has been compared to modern poltergeist stories.

The book describes events which supposedly took place during the summer of 1682 in Great Island (present-day New Castle), Province of New Hampshire. During the summer months, hundreds of stones rained down on a certain tavern. Nobody witnessed anyone throwing the stones. The tavern owner accused a female neighbor of using witchcraft against him, and she in turn accused him of being a wizard. The tavern was already controversial in the area, because the owner was a prosperous Quaker, its personnel included Native Americans, and its regular customers included so-called "godless" fishermen. The events marked the first major accusations about witchcraft in New England, starting a trend of similar accusations in other New England towns.

The word "lithobolia" comes from a religious festival of ancient Greece, the Lithobolia, in which participants threw stones at one another.

== Overview ==
The book's frontispiece describes itself as being "an Exact and True account (by way of Journal) of the various actions of infernal Spirits or (Devils Incarnate) Witches or both: and the great Disturbance and Amazement they gave to George Walton's family at a place called Great Island in the province of New Hampshire in New England, chiefly in throwing about (by an Invisible hand) Stones, Bricks, and Brick-Bats of all sizes, with several other things, as Hammers, Mauls, Iron-Crows, Spits, and other Utensils, as came into their Hellish minds, and this for space of a quarter of a year ..."

The "Stone-Throwing Devil" created quite a sensation on Great Island (present-day New Castle, New Hampshire) in 1682. Hundreds of stones mysteriously rained down on George Walton's tavern, as well as onto him, his son Shadrach and others in the area over the entire summer. Yet, no one ever came forward who saw anyone throwing the stones. Many other unexplained events also occurred at that time. Demonic voices were heard, and items were flung about inside Walton's tavern. Prominent Boston minister Increase Mather described the strange events in his book Illustrious Providences.

George Walton, who was in a property boundary dispute with his neighbor, accused her of witchcraft. She, in turn, accused him of being a wizard. Others in the area may also have had reasons to throw stones at Walton. He was a Quaker. Quakers were looked upon with great suspicion by Puritans, and just being a Quaker was a crime. Walton was a successful innkeeper, merchant, and lumberman, and became the largest landowner on the island. Walton was envied by his less industrious neighbors. There were also a number of lawsuits over business and property disputes. He also had two Native American employees, which would have caused great concern so soon after war with the Indians (King Philip's War) and because of the uneasy peace that existed. His tavern customers included a variety of rowdy outsiders, including "godless" fishermen, who were considered undesirables by others on the island. Regardless of what caused Walton and his inn to be the victim of a months-long rain of stones, it was the first major outbreak of apparent witchcraft in America.

News of it traveled throughout America and England. Within a few years, accusations of witchcraft would occur in other New England towns, culminating in the famous Salem witch trials.

== Alleged Witnesses ==
Chamberlain cites the following people as witnesses.

- Samuel Jennings, Deputy Governor of West Jersey
- Walter Clarke, Deputy Governor of Rhode Island and Providence Plantations
- Arthur Cook, Rhode Island Assemblyman
- Matthew Borden
- Oliver Hooten
- Thomas Maule, merchant
- Walter Barefoote, New Hampshire Customs Official
- John Hussey and wife, merchant

== Adaptions ==
In 1952, an uncredited writer and artist produced "The Devil's Stones", a 1-page comic for issue #5 of the Standard Comics horror anthology The Unseen based on the story.

== See also ==
- Eunice Cole
- Elizabeth Morse
- Puritans
