= USS Arctic =

USS Arctic is the name of several ships of the U.S. Navy:

- USS Arctic (1855), a screw steamer built by the Philadelphia Navy Yard
- Ice Boat No. 3, an 1873 municipal icebreaker briefly commissioned as the patrol vessel USS Arctic in the Spanish–American War
- USS Arctic (SP-1158), a 1913 tugboat used as a convoy escort in World War I
- USS Arctic (AF-7), an Arctic-class stores ship which saw service in World War II
- USNS Arctic (T-AOE-8), a fast combat support ship, commissioned as USS Arctic from 1995 to 2002

== See also ==
- Arctic (disambiguation)
