= Azesia =

Ancient Greek goddess of the harvest

Azesia or Azosia (Ancient Greek: Ἀζησία) was a cultic epithet of one or more Greek goddesses, or in some cases was possibly a distinct goddess. Different sources disagree on who it was an epithet of exactly: Hesychius of Alexandria wrote that this was an epithet of Demeter, while the Byzantine encyclopedia known as the Suda describes it as an epithet of Persephone. The playwright Sophocles apparently referred to Demeter as "Azesia" in one of his lost plays. At the same time, the name features in a number of ancient Greek proverbs clearly intending to mean Persephone. It was possibly simply a variant name of Auxesia.

The name occurred in communities throughout the Saronic Gulf paired with the goddess or hero Mnia, which mirrored similar paired goddesses or heroes of the harvest, fertility, and growth, such as Demeter and Persephone, and Auxesia and Damia (who may have been synonymous with Mnia).

The etymology and meaning of the name is unclear and the subject of some debate, and is likely derived either from an expression meaning "to dry fruits" (ἀζαίνειν τοὺς καρπούς) or one meaning "to seek" (ζητεῖν).

This goddess had a precinct in the Agora of Athens, as we know from the discovery of an ancient boundary marker.

Her name was the subject of several ancient Greek proverbs. One was "Amaia looked for Azesia", with "Amaia" being an epithet for Demeter, and Azesia in this instance indicating Persephone, and referring to Demeter's long search for her daughter after she had been kidnapped by the god Hades. It was used to refer to someone who took a long time to do something. Similarly, "Amaia has found Azesia" was an expression used to indicate that something greatly missed and sought after has been found.
