= Lithobolia (festival) =

Ancient Greek festival

The Lithobolia (Ancient Greek: Λιθοβόλια) was an apotropaic festival of ancient Greece associated with the cults of the harvest goddesses Damia and Auxesia -- sometimes used interchangeably with Demeter and Persephone -- celebrated throughout the Saronic Gulf, but especially in Troezen, Aegina, and Epidauros.

According to tradition, there was a civil insurrection or riot of some sort in Troezen, during which two foreign women who'd traveled from Crete named Auxesia and Damia happened to wind up between two opposing parties and were stoned to death, after which the people of Troezen paid honors to the woman and instituted the festival of Lithobolia, which means "stoning" or "stone fight". The citizens of Troezen were possibly ashamed at having murdered foreign guests to their city, though scholars have observed that the bloodshed of innocent passersby feature in many harvest festivals.

The exact nature of the festival is unclear, but scholars believe it was a purification rite and consisted of a kind of ritual abuse, similar to other fertility cults. This likely consisted of symbolic or actual battles of stone-throwing between participants, and the exchange of vulgar, sexualized language. While there may or may not have been real bloodshed during the event, it seems related to the ancient belief that blood sacrifices pleased the Chthonic deities. It was a popular belief that blood sprinkled on the ground protected crops from the anger of the gods. Other scholars liken it to the ritualistic role of a scapegoat, in which the greater good is served by the death of one or a few. The cults of these deified women involved aischrologia (αἰσχρολογία) or "filthy language", which possibly also featured in the Lithobolia.

The festival lent its name to a 17th century folk tale, Lithobolia.
