= Antarctica (disambiguation) =

Antarctica is a continent in the Southern Hemisphere with no permanent human population.

Antarctica may also refer to:

== Places ==
- Antarctic, the wider South Polar Region
- Antarctic Plate, the tectonic plate which covers the continent
- Antártica (commune), the Chilean commune including Chilean Antarctic territory
- Antártica Chilena Province, a Chilean province including the Chilean Antarctic territory and part of Isla Grande de Tierra del Fuego
- France Antarctique, a short-lived 16th-century colony in Brazil

== Arts and entertainment ==
=== Music ===
- Antarctica (band), a 1990s New York band

==== Albums ====
- Antarctica (Richie Beirach album) (1985)
- Antarctica (The Secret Handshake album) (2004)
- Antarctica (Vangelis album), a 1983 soundtrack album
- Antarctica: The Bliss Out, Vol. 2, a 1997 album by Windy & Carl

==== Songs ====
- "Antarctica" (song), by Suicideboys
- "Antarctica", a song by The Church from the album The Hypnogogue
- "Antarctica", a song by Immortal from the album Sons of Northern Darkness
- "Antarctica", a song by King Gizzard & the Lizard Wizard from the album Flight b741.

=== Film ===
- Antarctica (1983 film)
- Antarctica (1991 film)
- Antarctica (1995 film)
- Antarctica (2020 film)

=== Other arts and entertainment ===
- Antarctica (novel), a 1997 science fiction novel by Kim Stanley Robinson
- Antarctica: Empire of the Penguin, a theme area opened in 2013 at SeaWorld Orlando
- Antarctica, a 1999 short story collection by Claire Keegan

== See also ==
- Antarctic Circle
- Antarcticavis, an extinct genus of bird
- Arctica (disambiguation)
- Antarctic (disambiguation)
