= Katherine Harrison =

Woman convicted of witchcraft in 17th-century Connecticut

Katherine Harrison was a landowning widow who was subject to a historically notable 17th century witch trial in Wethersfield, Connecticut. Harrison was a servant earlier in her life, but when her husband who was a farmer died, she inherited property and wealth. Accusations of witchcraft followed this. Harrison was the last convicted witch in Wethersfield, Connecticut in 1669. This case served as an important example "in the development of the legal and theological responses to witchcraft in colonial New England."

== Widowhood ==
On 3 September 1666, her husband, John Harrison, died. He left behind a will dated 6 August 1666 in which a substantial amount of money and land was to be distributed to his wife and three daughters: £60 to his eldest daughter Rebeckah, £40 to his second daughter, and £40 to his youngest daughter Sarah. The estate and role of "sole Executrix" was left to his wife, Katherine Harrison.

On 6 September 1666, just days after the passing of her husband, Katherine Harrison petitioned the court to settle £210 to her oldest daughter and £200 to each of the younger daughters because of "inconsiderate portions left to them by their father." This was assumed to be denied by the courts since she later signed over the estate to her daughters and appointed Jonathon and John Gilbert as her daughters' guardians.

The death of Katherine Harrison's husband is prominent because before his death, Harrison was never formally accused of any witchcraft. John Harrison left his wife one of the wealthiest women in Wethersfield and she chose not to remarry.

== Witchcraft accusations ==
In the summer of 1668, just two years after Katherine Harrison was widowed, she was tried as a witch following several different testimonies. It was reported that Mr. Griswold was the main accuser of Katherine Harrison practicing witchcraft. Harrison stated that "the said Michael Griswold would Hang her though he damned long agoe". Michael Griswold claimed Harrison called his wife Ann a "savage whore." Within a month, Harrison filed a petition against their accusations of slandering, but soon gave in, acknowledging herself as "a female, a weaker vessel, subject to passion" and made her confession to her fault in slandering and offered to repair "the wound" she may have put in Griswold's name. Harrison eventually paid them £40 for slandering.

On October 6, 1668, Harrison wrote to the courts to seriously consider her state as a widow and recognize the attacks that have occurred on her property. She alleged that her livestock had been vandalized, with several examples of brutal attacks. She explained her oxen were being bruised so severely they were unserviceable or developing broken ribs and back, her pigs were being earmarked, and young cattle left with a weapon stabbed in it and being wounded to death. Harrison also noted that her cornfield was damnified with horses. She went on to claim that the damage to livestock and property all occurred after her husband's death. To account as a witness for the acts of vandalism, Harrison listed many individuals including Jonathan and Josiah Gilbert.

There was no record of the court ever responding to Harrison's requests or investigating her grievances.

=== Testimonies ===
John Welles was a neighbor of Katherine Harrison. He explained in his testimony from June 29, 1668 that his parents had cattle that were often late returning home. One evening his mother sent him to see if he "could [meet] them". The second time he was sent by his mother, he "went about half way [across] the street and could [go] no further" saying his "legs were bound." He claimed to have seen Katherine Harrison "rise up from a cow that was [not] of her [own]" holding a pail. Welles claimed this had happened about seven or eight years prior to his testimony.

At 50 years old, Thomas Waples testified on August 7, 1668 that Harrison was a "noted [liar]" that has read William Lilly's book in England and spun excessively, a common argument made against women accused of witchcraft as the myth told that the spindle assisted witches in flying their sabbath. Waples also accused Harrison of telling fortunes to Captain Cullet, who refrained from Katherine's services for her "evil conversation." He also noted that Gooddy Greenesmith also accused Harrison to be a witch.

Mary Olcott testified on August 8, 1668 with evidence of Katherine Harrison's act of fortune-telling, explaining how a woman named Elizabeth, who was currently married to Simon Smith, was told by Katherine that "[she] should have [been] married to William Chapman." After Katherine married John Harrison, she then allegedly told Elizabeth that her husband's name would be Simon.

Aged 52 years old, Richard Montague accused Katherine Harrison of gathering bees in his testimony on October 29, 1668. He claimed Harrison once said to him that a "swarm of her bees flew [away]," passing her neighbor Boreman's lot and ended up at the "Nabuck side" where she then "fetched" them and brought them back to her home.

Rebecka Smith, aged 75 at the time of her testimony, accused Katherine Harrison of tainting Goodwife Gilbert's black hat that she had lent her. Rebecka Smith claimed to have been at the home of the Gilberts for 14 days. Mrs. Gilbert lent Harrison her black hat and Katherine wished to purchase it from her. After Mr. Gilbert refused to sell it to Katherine, Mrs. Gilbert claimed to have worn the hat and felt very ill when wearing it, saying "her head and shoulders [were] much afflicted." Afterwards, Smith claimed to have heard the hat was burned and she fell ill herself and her family could attest to this.

William Warren also testified that Katherine Harrison was a "common and professed" fortune teller in testimony on October 30, 1668. She allegedly told the fortune of Warren himself, Simon Sackett, Elizabeth Batermen, and his master's daughter by looking at their hands and said she "had her skill from Lilly."

Samuel Martin Sr., about 50 years old, accused Katherine Harrison of another instance of fortune telling when he testified on May 25, 1669. He claimed she predicted the death of two men, Josiah Willard and Samuel Hale Senior. They spoke about them, and Katherine told Martin that he should soon "see them gone." He asked her why and she responded "doe you not know." One of the men was almost gone and Martin asked Katherine if she knew who that was. Harrison replied "Mr. Willard for he had been sick."

The testimony of Samuel Hurlibut and Alexander Keny, from May 26, 1669, was in regards to Katherine Harrison's grievances presented to the court on October 6, 1668. They testify that they know nothing about her accusation against Josiah Gilbert and "utterly disclaim it." They also note that Harrison claimed Gilbert to be her cousin but he knows no such matter and Harrison was the "one that followed the Army in England."

Eliazer Kimmerly, at about 28 years old, testified that he suspected Katherine Harrison caused the death of Master Robbins. Kimmerly also made a statement that they suspected Katherine Harrison's mother was bewitched. He claimed to have heard that his late wife often suspected that Master Robbins' late wife had died after Katherine Harrison spoke the words "in the presence of sondry persons. He says this took deep impression upon his spirit as suspicion of murder.

Alis Wakey, wife of James Wakely and about 50 years old, testified being present with Mrs Robbins (the death Eliazer Kimmerly testified on) while she was sick and died. Alis Wakely also claimed this was an "extraordinary" death. Wakely alleged that Robbins' body was so stiff that she and Goodwife Wright senior could not move any of her limbs when she was sick. After she died, Wakely said the body was "limber extraordinary."

== Life after sentencing and death ==
Harrison was released from jail in the late summer, early fall of 1669. Shortly after, 38 Wethersfield townsmen filed a petition. In October of 1669, all jury members found Harrison guilty of witchcraft but on the 20th of October her execution was stalled. In May of 1670, the courts ordered Katherine Harrison to pay her fees and flee the Wethersfield colony for good.

In June of 1670, Katherine Harrison moved to Westchester, New York, as an order of the court and with hopes of escaping the vandalism and demolishing of her property by neighbors. To her dismay, the neighbors in Westchester complained about her presence and ordered her to leave the city, but once she was brought into court in June of 1670, Westchester allowed her to live where she pleased. In early 1672, Harrison sued 11 of her neighbors for defamation of property. A month later, she signed over all her land to John Gilbert, her daughter's guardian.

Not much is known or recorded about Katherine Harrison after she signed over her estate in 1672. Some evidence suggests that she died in October of 1682 at Dividend, an area outside Wethersfield.

== See also ==
- Connecticut Witch Trials
