= Horae =

Greek mythology goddesses of the seasons and time

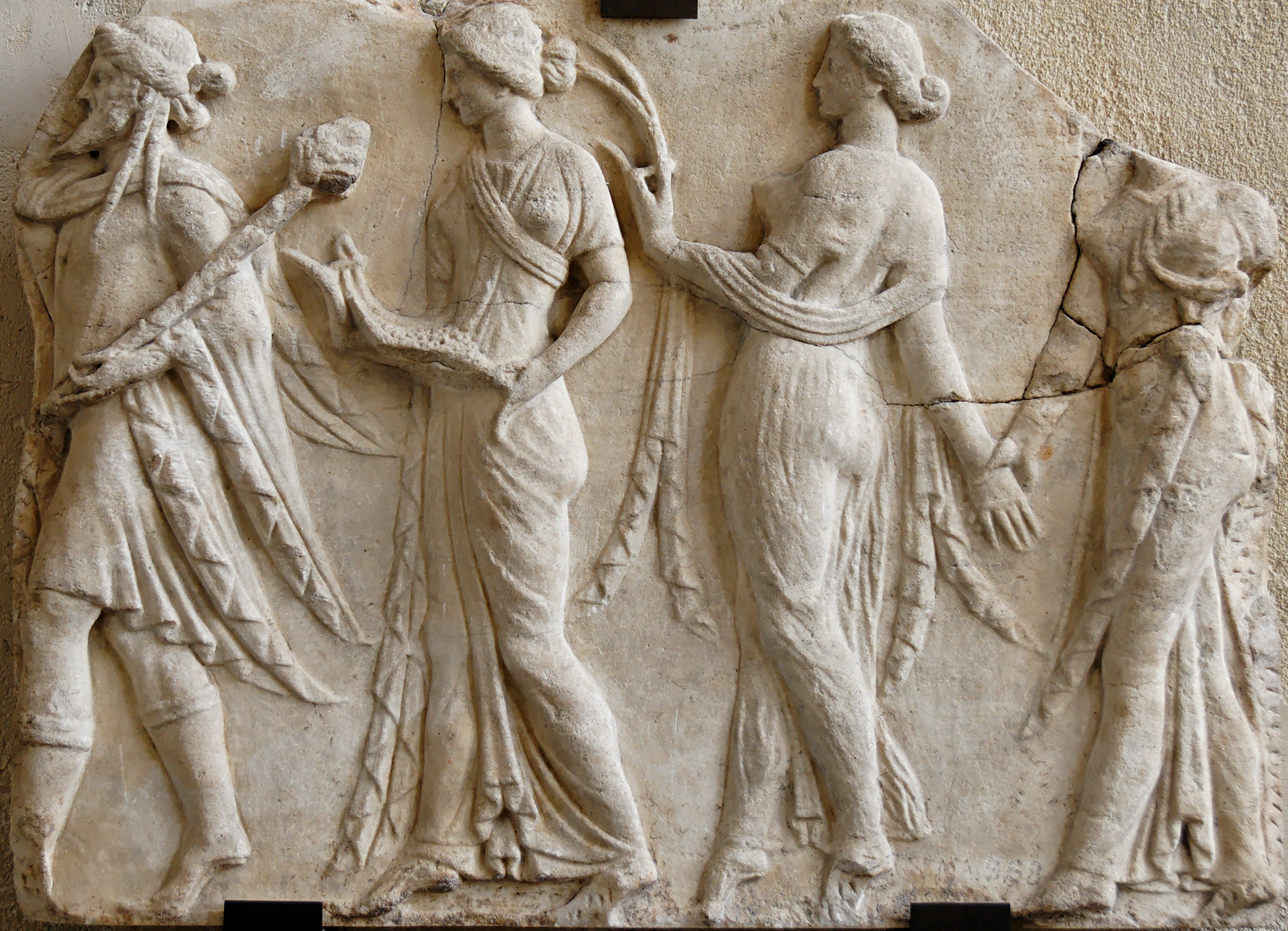
Dionysus leads the Horae. Dionysus carries his thyrsus, and the middle Hora hold ears of wheat. Neo-Attic Roman relief, c. 50–25 BC.

In Greek mythology, the Horae (/ˈhɔːriː/), Horai (/ˈhɔːraɪ/) or Hours (Ancient Greek: Ὧραι, romanized: Hôrai, lit. 'Seasons', pronounced [hɔ̂ːrai̯]) were the goddesses of the seasons and the natural portions of time.

== Etymology ==
The term hora comes from the Proto-Indo-European *yóh₁r̥ ("year").

== Function ==
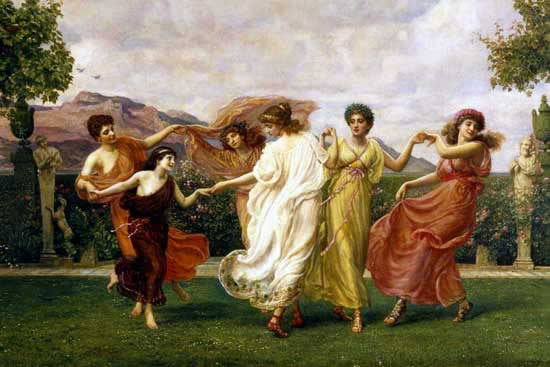
A detail of Horae Serenae by Edward Poynter (1894)

The Horae were originally the personifications of nature in its different seasonal aspects, but in later times they were regarded as goddesses of natural justice and order in general. "They bring and bestow ripeness, they come and go in accordance with the firm law of the periodicities of nature and of life", Karl Kerenyi observed, adding "Hora means 'the correct moment'." Traditionally, they guarded the gates of Olympus, promoted the fertility of the earth, and rallied the stars and constellations.

The course of the seasons was also symbolically described as the dance of the Horae, and they were accordingly given the attributes of spring flowers, fragrance and graceful freshness; for example, in Hesiod's Works and Days, the fair-haired Horai, together with the Charites and Peitho crown Pandora — she of "all gifts" — with garlands of flowers. Similarly Aphrodite, emerging from the sea and coming ashore at Cyprus, is dressed and adorned by the Horai, and, according to a surviving fragment of the epic Cypria, Aphrodite wore clothing made for her by the Charites and Horai, dyed with spring flowers, such as the Horai themselves wear.

== Names and numbers ==
The number of Horae varied according to different sources, but was most commonly three: either the trio of Thallo, Auxo, and Carpo (goddesses of the order of nature), or Eunomia (goddess of good order), Dike (goddess of Justice) and Eirene (goddess of Peace).

=== The classical Horae triads ===
The earliest written mention of Horai is in the Iliad where they appear as keepers of Zeus's cloud gates. "Hardly any traces of that function are found in the subsequent tradition," Karl Galinsky remarked in passing. They were daughters of Zeus and Themis, younger sisters of the Moirai.

The Horai are mentioned in two aspects in Hesiod and the Homeric Hymns:

- in one variant emphasizing their fruitful aspect, Thallo, Auxo, and Carpo —the goddesses of the three seasons the Greeks recognized: spring, summer and autumn— were worshipped primarily amongst rural farmers throughout Greece;
- in the other variant, emphasizing the "right order" aspect of the Horai, Hesiod says that Zeus wedded "bright Themis" who bore Dike, Eunomia, and Eirene, who were law-and-order goddesses that maintained the stability of society; they were worshipped primarily in the cities of Athens, Argos, and Olympia.

==== First triad ====
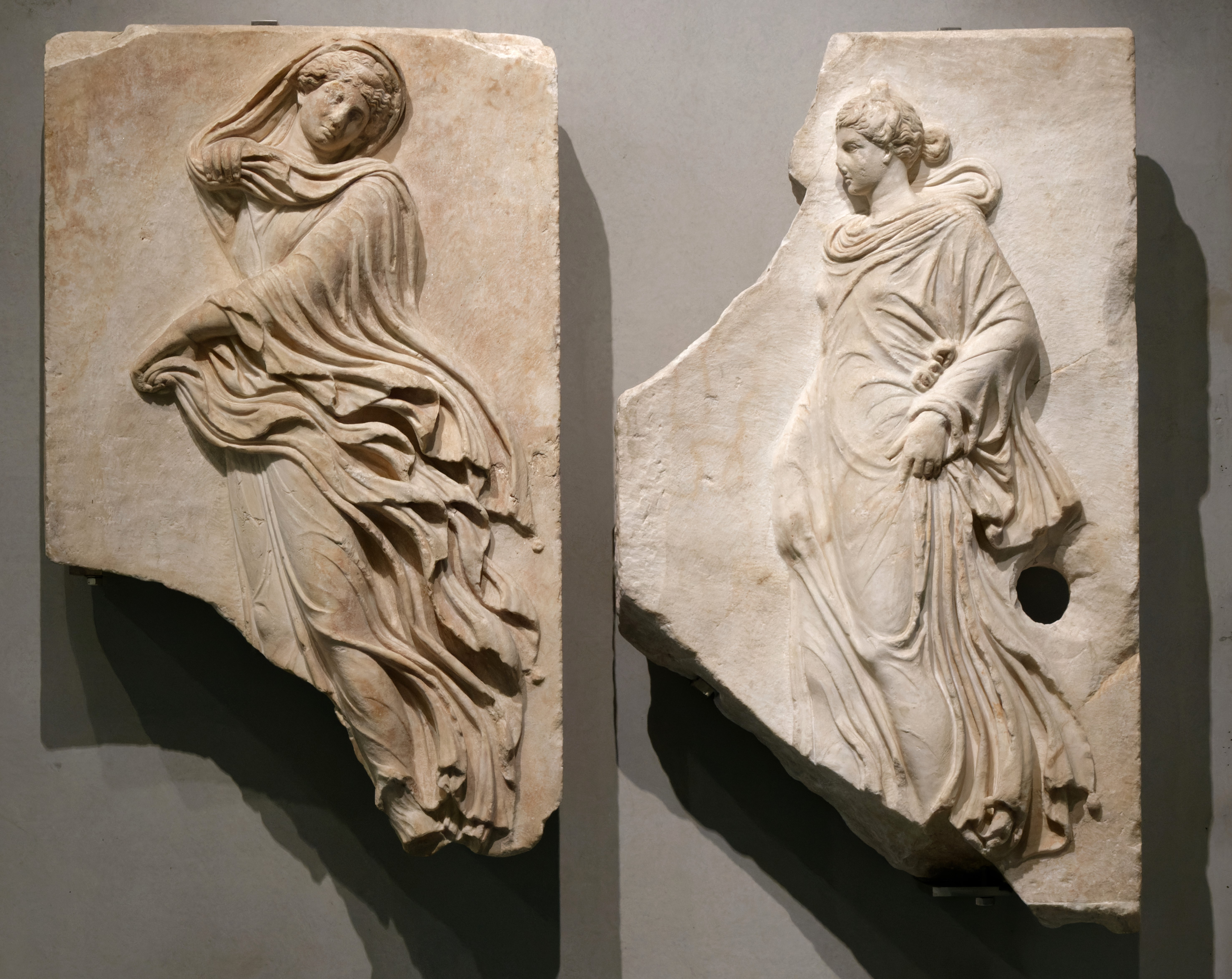
Roman marble reliefs of two female figures who may be Horae, 1st-century BC, Acropolis Museum in Athens.

Of the first, more familiar, triad associated with Aphrodite and Zeus is their origins as emblems of times of life, growth (and the classical three seasons of year):

- Thallo (Θαλλώ, from θάλλειν (thallein 'to sprout, grow', esp. fruit trees) or Thalatte was the goddess of spring, buds and blooms, and a protector of youth.
- Auxo (Αὐξώ, from αὐξάνειν (auxanein, 'to increase') or Auxesia was worshipped (alongside Hegemone) in Athens as one of their two Charites. Auxo was the Charis of spring and Hegemone was the Charis of autumn. One of the Horae, and the goddess and personification of the season of summer, she is the protector of vegetation and plants, and growth and fertility.
- Carpo (Καρπώ, from καρπῶν (karpōn) 'to bear fruit') Carpho, Xarpo or Damia (not to be mistaken with Karpos) was the one who brings food and was in charge of autumn, ripening, and harvesting, as well as guarding the way to Mount Olympus and letting back the clouds surrounding the mountain if one of the gods left. She was an attendant to Persephone, Aphrodite, and Hera, and was also associated with Dionysus, Apollo, and Pan.

At Athens, two Horae: Thallo (the Hora of spring) and Carpo (the Hora of autumn), also appear in rites of Attica noted by Pausanias in the 2nd century AD.

In Argos, the two Horae recognised were presumably winter and summer: Auxesia (possibly another name for Auxo) and Damia (possibly another name for Carpo). In late euhemerist interpretations, these Argive Horae were seen as Cretan maidens who were worshipped as goddesses after they had been wrongfully stoned to death.

==== Second triad ====
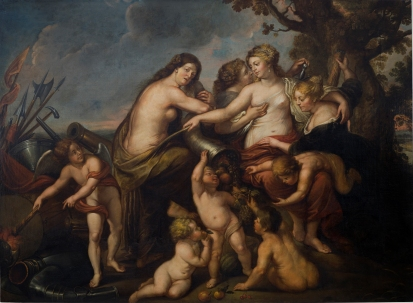
An allegory of the peace and happiness of the state; depicted are Dike (justice), Eunomia (order) and, in the center, Eirene (peace).The painting is by Jacob Jordaens

Of the second triad associated to Themis and Zeus for law and order:

- Dike (Δίκη, "Justice", her Roman equivalent was Iustitia) was the goddess of morality and justice: she ruled over human justice, as her mother Themis ruled over divine justice. The anthropomorphisation of Diké as an ever-young woman dwelling in the cities of men was so ancient and strong that in the 3rd century BCE Aratus in Phaenomena 96 asserted that she was born a mortal and that, though Zeus placed her on earth to keep mankind just, he quickly learned this was impossible and placed her next to him on Olympus, as the Greek astronomical/astrological constellation The Maiden.
- Eunomia (Εὐνομία, "Order", her Roman equivalent was Disciplina) was the goddess of law and legislation. The same or a different goddess may have been a daughter of Hermes and Aphrodite.
- Eirene (Εἰρήνη. "Peace", her Roman equivalent was Pax) was the personification of peace and wealth, and was depicted in art as a beautiful young woman carrying a cornucopia, scepter, and a torch or rhyton.

==== Third triad ====
The last triad of Horae was identified by Hyginus:

- Pherusa (Substance)
- Euporie (Abundance)
- Orthosie (Prosperity)

=== The Four Seasons ===
Nonnus in his Dionysiaca mentions a distinct set of four Horae, the daughters of Helios. Quintus Smyrnaeus calls the Horae daughters of Helios and Selene, and describes them as the four handmaidens of Hera. The seasons were personified by the ancients, the Greeks represented them generally as women but on some antique monuments they are depicted as winged children with attributes peculiar to each season. The Greek words for the four seasons of the year were as follows:

Name	Personified	Image	Description
Eiar	Spring		Crowned with flowers, holding either a kid or a sheep, and having near to her a budding shrub: she is also characterised by Mercury, and by a ram.
Theros	Summer		Crowned with ears of corn, holding a bundle of them in one hand and a sickle in the other: she is also characterised by Apollo, and by a serpent.
Phthinoporon	Autumn		Either holds bunches of grapes, or has a basket of fruits upon her head: she is also characterised by Bacchus, and by a lizard or hare.
Cheimon	Winter		Well clothed, and the head covered, stands near a tree deprived of foliage, with dried and withered fruits in one hand and water-fowls in the other: she is also characterised by Hercules, and by a salamander.

Here Spring appears with flowery chaplets bound.
Here Summer in her wheaten garland crown'd;
Here Autumn the rich trodden grapes besmear.
And hoary Winter shivers in the rear.

— Ovid, Metamorphoses 2.34

==== Modern influence ====
Nicolas Poussin has represented the four seasons by subjects drawn from the Bible: Spring is portrayed by Adam and Eve in paradise: Summer, by Ruth gleaning: Autumn, by Joshua and Caleb bearing grapes from the promised land; and Winter, by the deluge.

In more modern representations the seasons are often surrounding Apollo: Spring, as Flora, crowned with flowers, and in a shaded green drapery over a white robe: Summer, standing under the lion in the zodiac, with a gold-coloured drapery over a white gauze vestment, the edges of which are tinged by the yellow rays of the sun, holding a sickle, having near her a wheat-sheaf; Autumn, as a Bacchante, in a violet-coloured garment, pressing grapes with one hand into a golden cup, which she holds in the other; and Winter as an aged person, placed in the shade at a great distance from the god.

=== The Hours ===
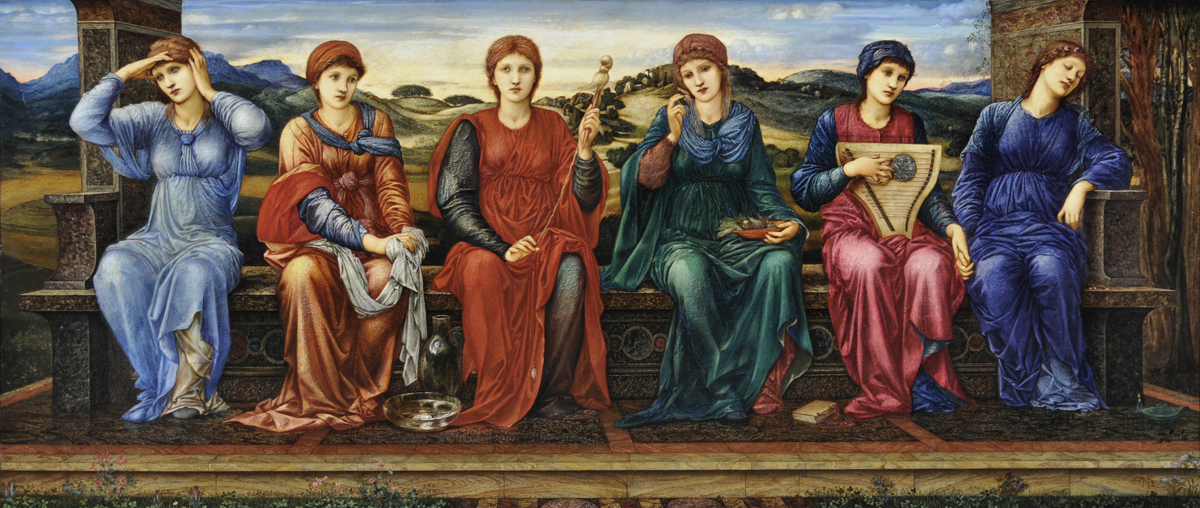
The Hours by Edward Burne-Jones (1882)

Finally, a quite separate suite of Horae personified the twelve hours (originally only ten), as tutelary goddesses of the times of day. The hours run from just before sunrise to just after sunset, thus winter hours are short, summer hours are long:

==== The nine Hours ====
According to Hyginus, the list is only of nine, borrowed from the three classical triads alternated:

Name	Personified	Triad
Auxo	Growth	1st triad
Eunomia	Order	2nd triad
Pherusa	Substance	3rd triad
Carpo	Fruit	1st triad
Dike	Justice	2nd triad
Euporie	Abundance	3rd triad
Thallo	Flora	1st triad
Eirene	Peace	2nd triad
Orthosie	Prosperity	3rd triad

==== The twelve Hours ====
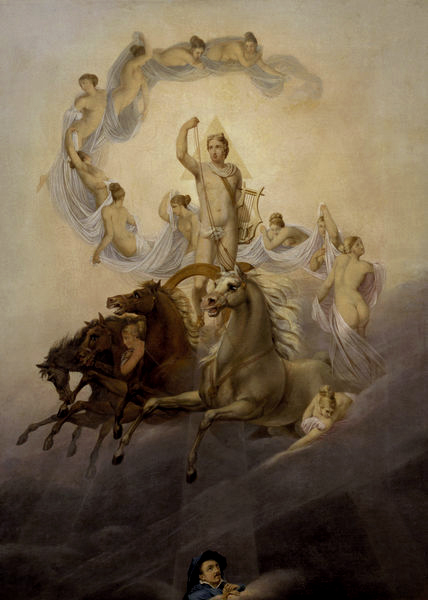
Apollo with the Hours by Georg Friedrich Kersting (1822)

A distinct set of ten or twelve Hours is much less known and they are described as daughters of Chronos (Time):

Name	Description
Auge	First light (initially not part of the set)
Anatolê	Sunrise
Musica	The morning hour of music
Gymnastica	The morning hour of gymnastics
Nymphe	The morning hour of bathing
Mesembria	Noon
Sponde	Libations poured after lunch
Elete	Prayer
Acte	Eating and pleasure
Hesperis	Evening
Dysis	Sunset
Arctus	Night sky, constellation (initially not part of the set)

==== The twenty-four Hours ====
The last set of hours of the day and night is allegorically represented in the following:

Hours	Description	Ruling Planet
Twelve Hours of Morning	The ancients supposed each of the hours to be governed by a separate planet.	Ruling Planet
First hour	Represented as a young girl, her head adorned with light flowing hair; she is clad in a short dress of rose-colour, resembling the tints of the clouds before the rising of the sun; her wings are like those of a butterfly, and she holds the Sun and a bunch of full-blown roses.	Sun
Second hour	Appears to have wings like the preceding; her hair is of a darker hue, and her dress of a deep gold colour; she is surrounded by light clouds, indicating the vapours which the sun exhales from the earth; her attributes are the planet Venus and a sunflower.	Venus
Third hour	Her hair is brown, and her drapery is white, shaded with red; she holds the planet Mercury and a sun-dial.	Mercury
Fourth hour	Considered to be time best calculated for gathering herbs, as the heat of the sun had by then dissipated the clouds, and sufficiently dried the earth; its personification was therefore clothed entirely in white, and bore a hyacinth and the figure of the Moon.	Moon
Fifth hour	Her robe was tinged with lemon colour, denoting the golden brightness of the sun as it advances towards the meridian; in her hand was the planet Saturn	Saturn
Sixth hour	Turns her face to the beholder, and as the sun has now attained its greatest power, her dress is red and flaming; her accompaniments are the planet Jupiter and a lotus, which, like the sunflower, follows the course of the sun.	Jupiter
Seventh hour	Her dress is orange, tinged with red; she holds the planet Mars and a lupin, a plant that, according to Pliny, served to indicate the time to the country people on a cloudy day.	Mars
Eighth hour	Wears a variegated robe of orange and white, showing the diminution of light, now beginning to be apparent; the Sun is in her hands.	Sun
Ninth hour	Her attitude and that of the two preceding hours, inclines towards the horizon; her dress is lemon-coloured; she bears the planet Venus and a branch of olive, a tree said by Pliny to shed its leaves during the solstice.	Venus
Tenth hour	She is dressed in yellow, tinged with brown; she holds the planet Mercury and a branch of poplar.	Mercury
Eleventh hour	As the day draws to its close, appeared to be precipitating her flight; her drapery is dark yellow, and her attributes are a moon and a clepsydra, or hour-glass, which marks the time without the sun's assistance.	Moon
Twelfth hour	Seems in the act of plunging beneath the horizon, thus denoting the setting of the sun; she is dressed in a robe of dark violet colour, and holds the planet Saturn and a branch of willow.	Saturn
Twelve Hours of Night	These, like the hours of the day, are depicted with wings, and in the attitude of flying; they differ from each other only in the colour of their drapery, and in their various attributes.	
First hour	Her robe is of the hue of the horizon during twilight; she bears in her hands the planet Jupiter and a bat.	Jupiter
Second hour	Habited in dark gray, and holds the planet Mars and a screech owl.	Mars
Third hour	Clad in black, carries an owl and the Sun.	Sun
Fourth hour	Her dress is not quite so dark as that of the preceding, because the light of the heavenly bodies now diminishes in some measure the obscurity of night; she holds the planet Venus and an hour-glass.	Venus
Fifth hour	Her attributes are the planet Mercury and a bunch of poppies.	Mercury
Sixth hour	She is enveloped in a thick black drapery, and holds the Moon and a cat, which has the faculty of seeing in the dark.	Moon
Seventh hour	Her robe is deep blue; she bears the planet Saturn and a badger, that animal being much disposed to sleep.	Saturn
Eighth hour	Clad in a lighter blue, holds the planet Jupiter and a dormouse.	Jupiter
Ninth hour	Dressed in violet colour, to denote the approach of morning, and is characterised by the planet Mars and an owl.	Mars
Tenth hour	Her robe is of a paler shade of violet; she bears the Sun and a clock surmounted by a bell.	Sun
Eleventh hour	Habited in blue, and accompanied by a cock, holds the planet Venus.	Venus
Twelfth hour	Her attitude of flying precipitately behind the horizon; her drapery is of mixed colours, white, blue, and violet; she bears in her hand the planet Mercury, and leads a swan, which, by its white plumage, indicates the brightness of the coming day.	Mercury
