= Chronos =

Ancient Greek personification of time

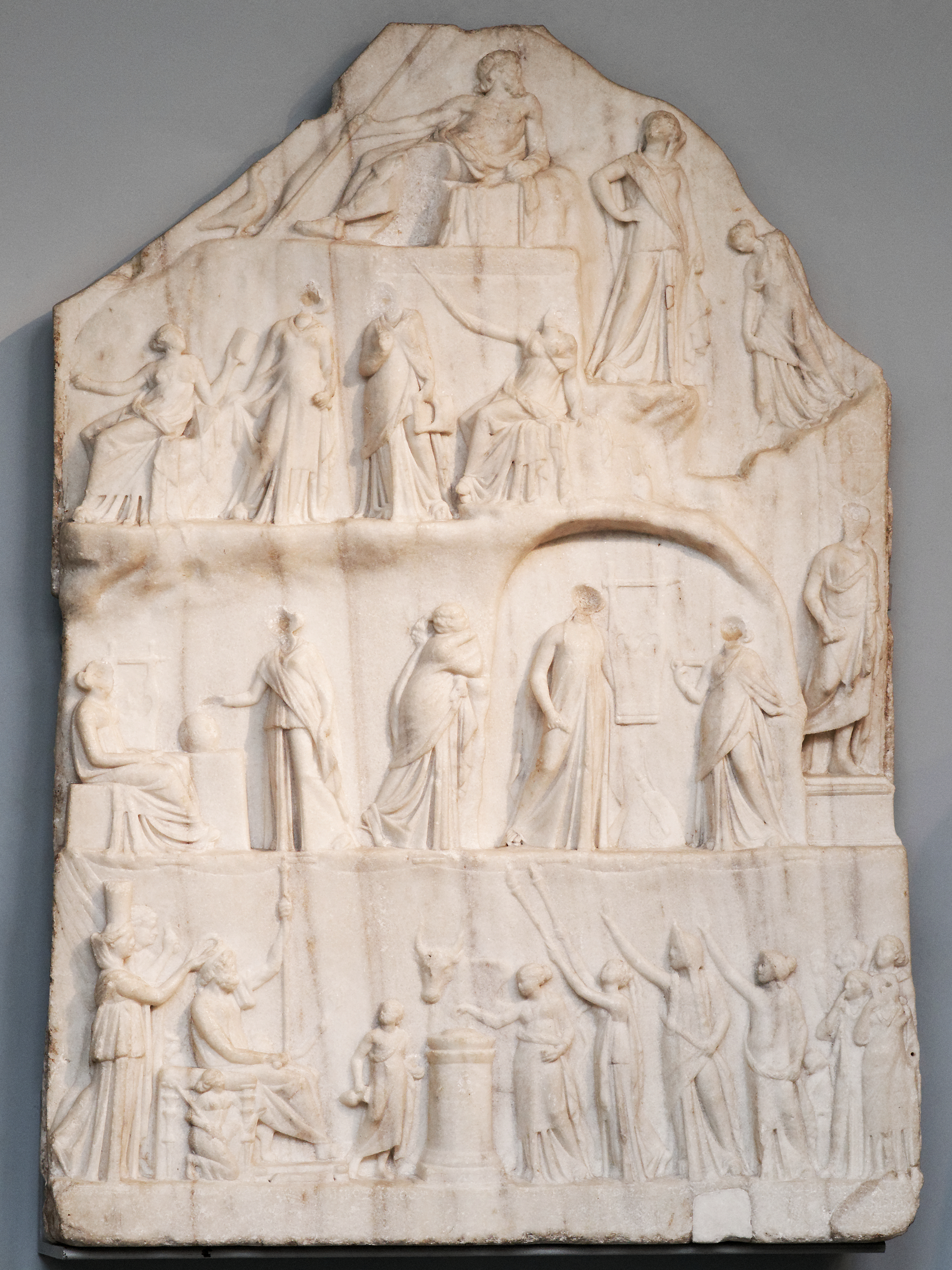
Chronos (left, background) stands beside Oikoumene (left, foreground), who places a crown atop the head of the poet Homer (right). Chronos is winged, is dressed in a chiton, and holds a volumen in each hand. This is the only certain depiction of Chronos in ancient art. Marble relief from Italy, c. 130 BC.

Chronos (/ˈkroʊnɒs, -oʊs/; Ancient Greek: Χρόνος, romanized: Khronos, lit. 'Time'; [kʰrónos], Modern Greek: ['xronos]), also spelled Chronus, is a personification of time in Greek mythology, who is also discussed in pre-Socratic philosophy and later literature. His consort is the goddess Ananke.

Chronos is frequently confused with, or perhaps consciously identified with, the Titan Cronus in antiquity, due to the similarity in names. The identification became more widespread during the Renaissance, giving rise to the iconography of Father Time wielding the harvesting scythe.

Greco-Roman mosaics depicted Chronos as a man turning the zodiac wheel. He is comparable to the deity Aion as a symbol of cyclical time. He is usually portrayed as an old, callous man with a thick grey beard, personifying the destructive and stifling aspects of time.

== Name ==
During antiquity, Chronos was occasionally interpreted as Cronus. According to Plutarch, the Greeks believed that Cronus was an allegorical name for Chronos.

== Mythology ==
In the Orphic tradition, the unaging Chronos was "engendered" by "earth and water", and produced Aether, Chaos, and an egg. The egg produced the hermaphroditic god Phanes who gave birth to the first generation of gods and is the ultimate creator of the cosmos.

Pherecydes of Syros in his lost Heptamychos ("The seven recesses"), around 6th century BC, claimed that there were three eternal principles: Chronos, Zas (Zeus) and Chthonie (the chthonic). The semen of Chronos was placed in the recesses of the Earth and produced the first generation of gods.

== See also ==
- Kairos
- Father Time
