= Aidos =

Theme in Ancient Greek literature

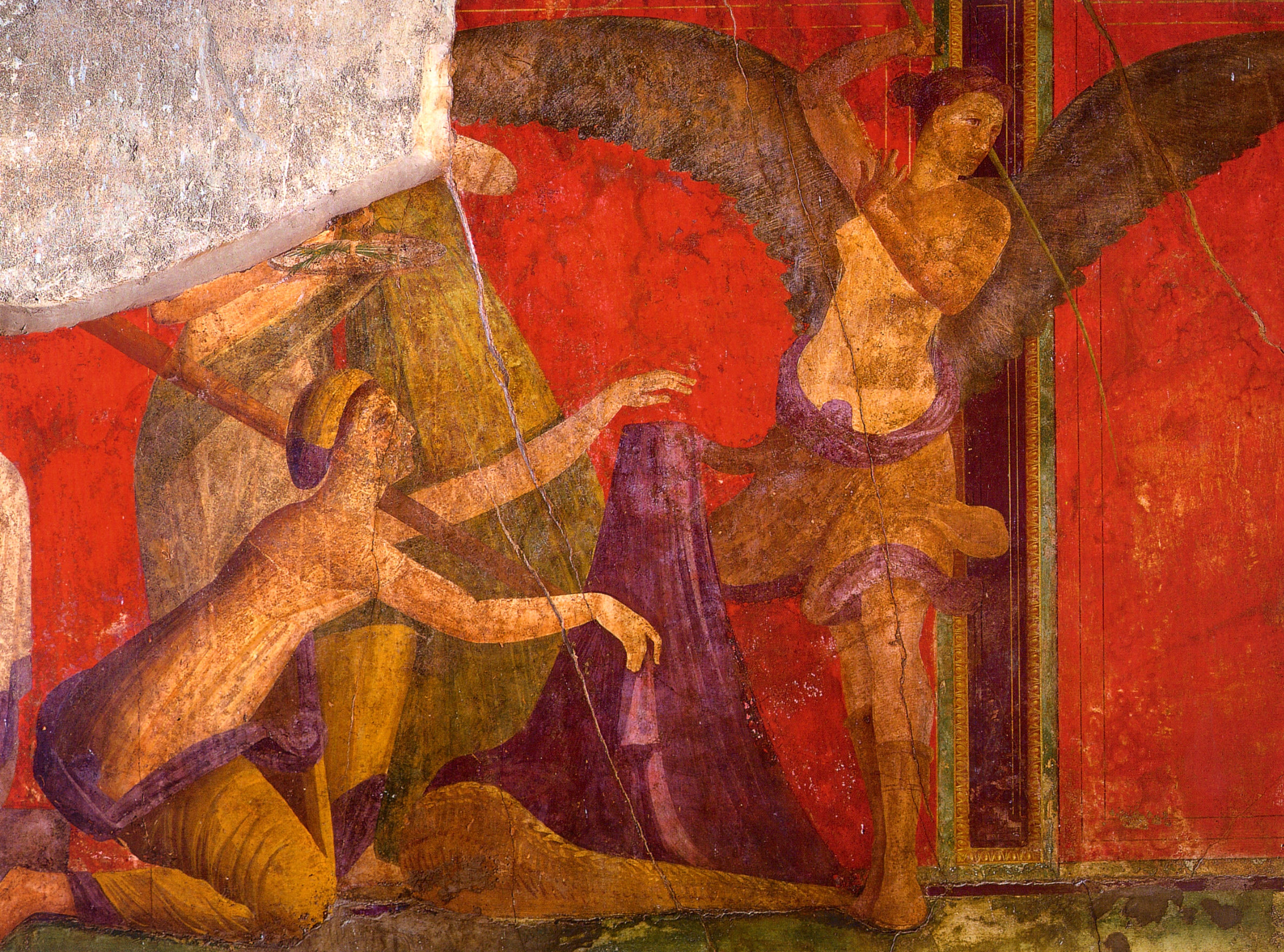
Fresco from the Villa de Misteri, Pompeii

Aidos or Aedos (/ˈiːdɒs/; Greek: Αἰδώς, pronounced [ai̯dɔ̌ːs]) was the Greek personification of either shame or modesty. Aidos, as a quality, was that feeling of reverence or shame which restrains men from wrong. It also encompassed the emotion that a rich person might feel in the presence of the impoverished, that their disparity of wealth, whether a matter of luck or merit, was ultimately undeserved. Ancient and Christian humility share common themes: they both reject egotism, self-centeredness, arrogance, and excessive pride; they also recognize human limitations. Aristotle defined it as a middle ground between vanity and cowardice.

== Mythology ==
She was the last goddess to leave the earth after the Golden Age. She was a close companion of the goddess of vengeance Nemesis. One source calls her daughter of Prometheus. Mythologically, she is often considered to be more of a personification than a physical deity.

There are references to her in various early Greek plays, such as Prometheus Bound by Aeschylus, Iphigenia at Aulis by Euripides, and Oedipus Rex by Sophocles.

There were altars to Aidos in Athens and in Sparta. Icarius, a Spartan king, tried to persuade his daughter Penelope to stay in Sparta after her marriage to Odysseus. When Odysseus made Penelope choose between her father and her husband, she modestly covered her face with a veil, signaling her decision to leave with Odysseus. Understanding her choice, Icarius let them go and commemorated the moment by erecting a statue of Aidos at the spot.

Some sources mention Aeschyne (Ancient Greek: Αἰσχύνη) as a personification of shame and reverence.

== See also ==
- Eleos: Goddess of pity, mercy, clemency, and compassion.
- Epiphron: God of prudence.
- Sophrosyne: Goddess of moderation and temperance.
