= Amechania =

Spirit of impossibility in Greek mythology

In Greek mythology, Amechania or Amekhania (Ancient Greek: Àμηχανίην) was the spirit of impossibility. She was regarded as a close companion (and sister) of Penia and Ptocheia. She was virtually identical to Aporia. Amechania was mentioned by ancient Greek authors such as Alcaeus and Herodotus.
