= Metis (mythology) =

Oceanid of Greek mythology

- Goddess of wisdom, counsel and deep thought
- Member of the Oceanids
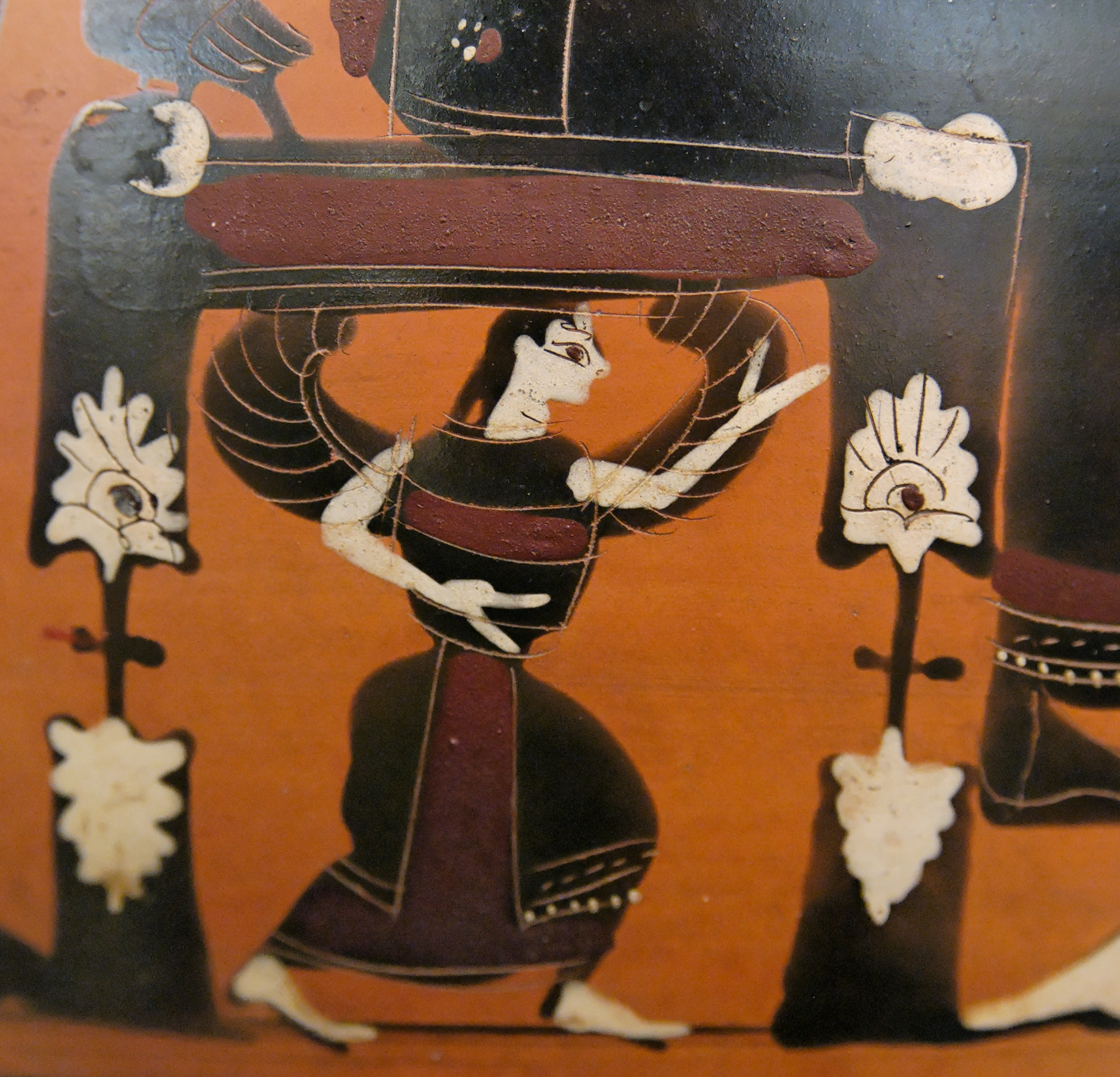
- A winged goddess depicted under Zeus's throne, possibly Metis.

Genealogy
- Parents: Oceanus and Tethys
- Siblings: Oceanids, River gods
- Spouse: Zeus
- Offspring: Athena, Porus

Metis (/ˈmiːtɪs/; Ancient Greek: Μῆτις, romanized: Mêtis; Modern Greek: Μήτις, lit. 'wisdom' or 'skill' or 'craft'), in ancient Greek religion and mythology, was the pre-Olympian goddess of wisdom, counsel and deep thought, and a member of the Oceanids. She is notable for being the advisor and first wife of Zeus, the king of the gods. She first helped him to free his siblings from their father Cronus's stomach and later helped their daughter Athena to escape from the forehead of Zeus, who swallowed both mother and child after it was foretold that she would bear a son mightier than his father.

Metis has been applied as a concept of literary criticism, notably by Jean-Pierre Vernant, along with Marcel Detienne.

== Function ==
By the era of Greek philosophy in the 5th century BC, Metis had become the first deity of wisdom and deep thought, but her name originally connoted "magical cunning" and was as easily equated with the trickster powers of Prometheus as with the "royal metis" of Zeus, who is titled Metieta (Ancient Greek: Μητίετα, lit. 'the wise counsellor') in the Homeric poems. The Stoic commentators allegorised Metis as the embodiment of "prudence", "wisdom" or "wise counsel", in which form she was inherited by the Renaissance.

The Greek word metis meant a quality that combined wisdom and cunning. This quality was considered to be highly admirable, the hero Odysseus being the embodiment of it, for example using such a strategy against Polyphemus, son of Poseidon. In the Classical era, metis was regarded by Athenians as one of the notable characteristics of the Athenian character.

== Mythology ==
=== Hesiod's account ===
In the Theogony by the 8th- or 7th-century BC poet Hesiod, Metis was one of the Oceanids, the 3000 daughters of the Titans Oceanus and Tethys. Metis gave her cousin Zeus an emetic potion to cause his father Cronus, the supreme ruler of the cosmos, to vomit out his siblings – Hestia, Demeter, Hera, Hades, and Poseidon – whom their father had swallowed out of fear of being overthrown. After Zeus and his siblings won the Titanomachy, the 10-year war among the Titans and the Olympians, he pursued Metis and they got married.

Metis was both an indispensable aid and a threat to Zeus. He lay with her, but immediately feared the consequences, for it had been prophesied by Gaia and Uranus that Metis would bear a daughter who would be wiser than her mother, and then a son more powerful than his father, who would eventually overthrow Zeus and become the king of the cosmos in his place. In order to forestall these consequences, Zeus tricked Metis into turning herself into a fly and promptly swallowed her. However, she was already pregnant with their first and only child, Athena, whom Metis raised in Zeus's mind. It is from this position that Metis continues to give Zeus advice as a ruler.

Once Athena fully grew up, Metis crafted robes, an armor, a shield, and a spear for her daughter, who banged her spear and shield together in order to give her father a terrible headache. Soon, Zeus could not take his headache anymore and had the smith god Hephaestus – a son of Hera, now Zeus's queen – cut his head open to let out whatever was in there on the river Triton's banks. Athena emerged from Zeus's mind full grown, wearing the armor her mother made for her. She was soon made the goddess of wisdom, warfare, and crafts.

But Zeus lay with the fair-cheeked daughter of Ocean and Tethys apart from Hera ... deceiving Metis although she was full wise. But he seized her with his hands and put her in his belly, for fear that she might bring forth something stronger than his thunderbolt: therefore did Zeus, who sits on high and dwells in the aether, swallow her down suddenly. But she straightway conceived Pallas Athena: and the father of men and gods gave her birth by way of his head on the banks of the river Trito. And she remained hidden beneath the inward parts of Zeus, even Metis, Athena's mother, worker of righteousness, who was wiser than gods and mortal men.

=== Other versions ===
According to a scholiast on the Theogony, Metis had the ability of changing her shape at will. Zeus tricked her and swallowed his pregnant wife when she transformed into a πικρὰν (Note: In accusative.) (pikràn). As Keightley notes, πικρὰ ("bitter") makes little or no sense in that context, and it has been variously corrected to μυῖαν (muîan, meaning "fly") or μικρὰν (mikràn, meaning "small thing") instead.

According to Apollodorus, Metis was raped by Zeus and changed many forms in order to escape him after he pursued her. An alternative version of the same myth makes the Cyclops Brontes rather than Zeus the father of Athena before Metis is swallowed.

Hesiod's account is followed by Acusilaus and the Orphic tradition, which enthroned Metis side by side with Eros as primal cosmogenic forces. Plato makes Poros, or "creative ingenuity", a son of Metis.

A close connection has been argued between Metis and Thetis, another shapeshifting sea-power later beloved by Zeus, that was bound by prophecy to bear a son greater than his father.

== Ancient legacy ==
The similarities between Zeus swallowing Metis and Cronus swallowing his children have been noted by several scholars. This also caused some controversy in regard to reproduction myths.

== Modern legacy ==
- Metis Island in Antarctica is named after Metis.
- 9 Metis, one of the larger main-belt asteroids, is named after this goddess.
- Metis, a moon of Jupiter, is named after the goddess.

== See also ==
- Themis
- Epiphron
