= Porus (mythology) =

Ancient Greek deity

There are related mythological figures named Porus or Poros (Ancient Greek: Πόρος, lit. 'Resource', 'Plenty') in Greek classical literature.

In Plato's Symposium, Porus was the personification of resourcefulness or expediency. Porus was the son of the goddess Metis, but his father is unknown.

He was seduced by Penia (poverty) while drunk on more than his fill of nectar at Aphrodite's birthday. Penia gave birth to Eros (love) from their union. According to the character Diotima, Eros is forever in need because of his mother, but forever pursuing because of his father.
