= Penia =

Greek goddess and personification of poverty

In Plato's Symposium, Penia /ˈpiːniə/ (Ancient Greek: Πενία, Penía), or Penae /ˈpiːˌniː/ (Latin: "Poverty", "Deficiency"), is the personification of poverty and need. She conceived Eros with an intoxicated Porus ("Resource", "Contrivance") in Zeus's garden while at Aphrodite's birthday. Her sisters are Amechania and Ptocheia. Penia was also mentioned by other ancient Greek writers such as Alcaeus (Fragment 364), Theognis (Fragment 1; 267, 351, 649), Aristophanes (Plutus, 414ff), Herodotus, Plutarch (Life of Themistocles), and Philostratus (Life of Apollonius).

== Mythology ==
=== Plato's account ===
Perhaps one of the most famous mentions is in Plato's Symposium (203b–e), a Socratic Dialogue written by Plato c. 385–370 BC. She is part of a story narrated by Socrates, that he originally heard from a priestess by the name of Diotima. There, Penia appears during a banquet thrown by the gods to celebrate the birth of Aphrodite, in order to beg. In the hope for alleviating her misery, she sleeps with Poros, god of wealth, while he is intoxicated from drinking too much, resulting in the birth of Eros, God of Love; who is a combination of both his parents, in that he is forever in need and forever pursuing.

=== Aristophanes' portrayal ===
In her portrayal by the playwright Aristophanes, Penia attempts to convince two foolish men about the dangers of allowing wealth to be abundant for everybody. She debates the issue of motivation among those who are wealthy; by acquiring a luxurious life, humans will not see a need to put in effort to produce goods and products. She explains that there will come a time when mankind will not be able to purchase much of anything because of low supply, and people will end up working significantly harder than before in order to obtain food or build furniture. She understands that she is resented, but also knows that she is vital for maintaining the continuity of mankind.
