= Griechische und römische Götter- und Heldensage =

1897 book by Hermann Steuding

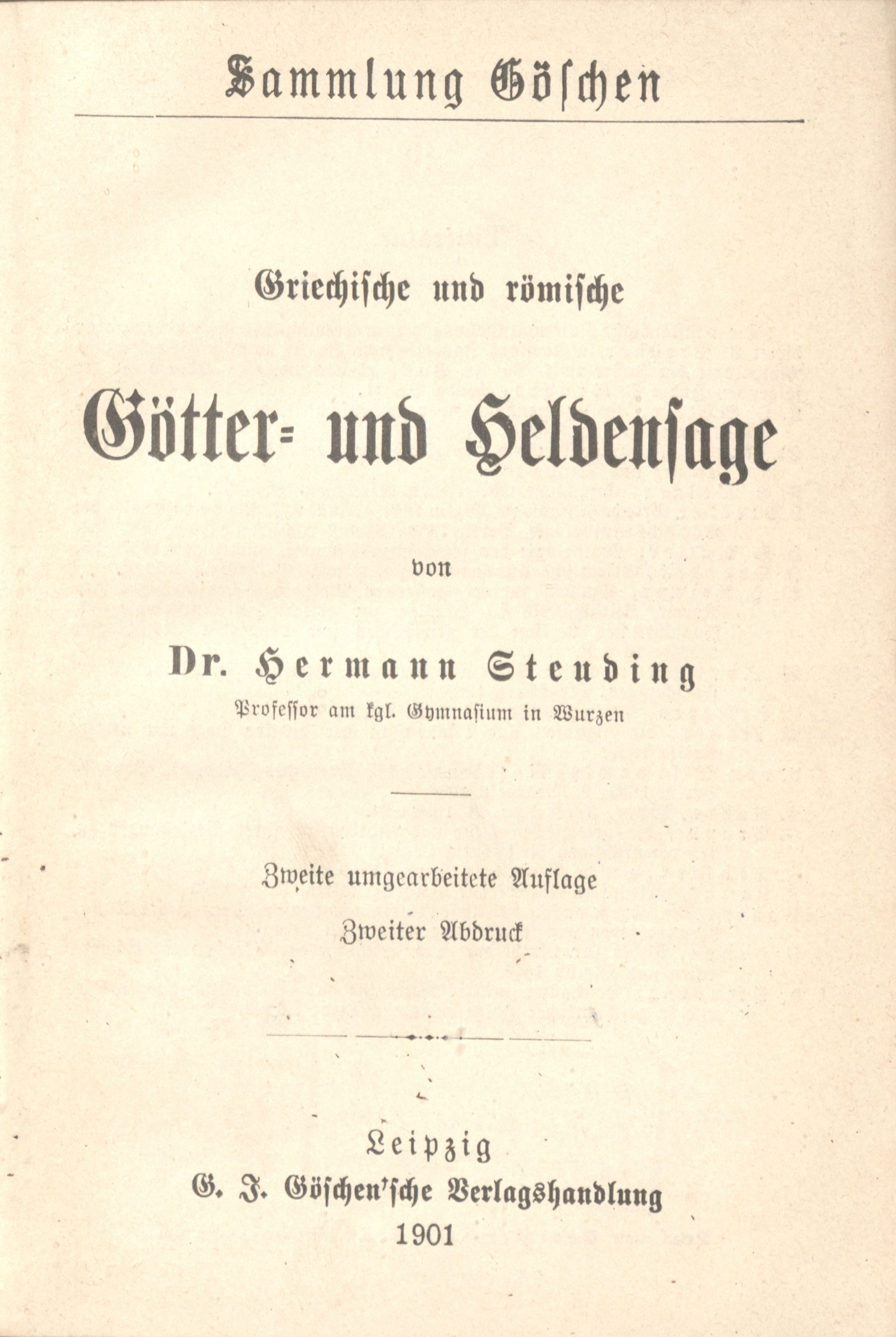
Title page

Griechische und römische Götter- und Heldensage (English: Greek and Roman mythology) is a book written by Hermann Steuding (1850-1917), which was published 1897 in Leipzig by G.J. Göschen. This book is a second edition of the original work "Griechische und römische Mythologie" published in 1892. The book offers an overview of the origins of Greek and Roman mythology. Since its publication, it has been reworked and translated multiple times and is his most famous publication. His work was well received, and has been described as valuable by proficient scholars.

== Context ==
Steuding was a classical philologist, teacher, and headmaster, who received his Doctor of Philosophy at the University of Jena in 1874, with his dissertation focusing on the tradition history of the works of Roman poet Tibull. After his dissertation, he started to work as a teacher in Gotha, before transferring to Wurzen. During his time in Würzen the school was transformed into a royal “Humanistisches Gymnasium” (Humanistic Gymnasium), focusing on the old languages (Greek, Latin, Hebrew). While teaching he wrote several books including school books, such as Beiträge zur Textkritik im Dialog des Tacitus (English: Contributions to textual criticism in the dialogues of Tacitus) from 1878 and Denkmäler antiker Kunst für das Gymnasium ausgewählt und in geschichtlicher Folge erläutert (English: Chosen antique monuments of art and explained in historical order).

Steuding was not the only German scholar of the late 19th century focusing on Greek and Roman mythology. Several authors produced publications, ranging from the discussion of smaller legends to the description of the whole Greek and Roman mythology, similar to the one by Steuding. Besides individual publications the journal Jahresbericht über die Fortschritte der klassischen Alterthumswissenschaft, also known as Bursians Jahresbericht, published editions solely focused on available literature about Greek and Roman mythology, such as Volume 25, which was published in 1891. Steudings work is based on such works of the 19th century, as all mentioned literature ranges from 1825 to 1896.

== Contents ==
The book is divided in two parts, with one part about Greek mythology and the other focusing on Roman mythology. The Greek part can be further divided into three parts.

1. Beginnings of Greek Belief and Worship: This part describes that in the beginning ghosts, spirits, or souls of deceased individuals were thought to exist in a form associated with the body of the deceased. The origins of these beliefs are rooted in the fear of death and also to explain otherwise inexplicable phenomena. In addition to ghosts, nether world powers, known as heroes are also discussed. These heroes were believed to be able to influence the lives of those living in the vicinity of their underground homes. Typically reputed individuals of families were regarded as heroes, and their graves became places of worship. In addition to that Natural and elemental powers are discussed, as well as Worship. Natural and elemental activities, exercising a force were believed to be caused by nature-demons. Finally, the author discusses the attributes and evolution of ancient Greek worship.
2. Greek Religion from the beginning of the Homeric Age: In this part, the classification of Gods as a result of migrations is discussed. This explanation is followed by a description of changes due to the migration such as the beginning of burning the deceased, and the accompanying changes in beliefs. This part further introduces many new concepts and offers explanations of their history such as Hades, Harpies, Erinyes, and Asklepios. The part closes with a thorough look and description of all Olympian deities.
3. Heroic Literature: The Theban, Argos, Mykenai and Tyrns are discussed in this part. These stories are followed by commonly known heroic stories such as Herakles, Theseus, Meleager, the Argonauts, and the Theban, Achian, and Trojan cycle. In these stories, their origins and different versions are being touched upon.
4. Roman Mythology: This part deals with the native Roman religion prior to the introduction of Greek gods. This native religion included beings, that didn't grow into concepts or personalities, but still remained to be worshiped. Additionally the traditional deities are being discussed and explained. These include deities of Springs (River Gods, and Neptunus), Ianus (Vesta, Volcanus, Saturnus, Consus and Ops), the deities of fertility( Faunus, Silvanus, Liber and Vertumunus, Fauna and Feronia, Flora and Pales and Diana), and Mars. Furthermore Iuppiter, and Iuno, and the deities of death are discussed as well. This part closes with personifications of beliefs, such as Fortuna, the goddess of good luck, and finally with a description of foreign gods.

== Reception ==
The publication by Steuding was well received. Until 1913 five editions of it were published in German, and in a newspaper review in 1912 its popularity was mentioned. In addition, it was also described as valuable, by Lionell D. Barnett, who translated it into English, with the hope that there was a public interest in this topic, as he expresses the importance of studying Greek and Roman mythology. It was also translated into English by Karl Pomeroy Harrington, and Herbert Cushing Tolman for American students. Besides English, the book was also translated into Spanish, where it received multiple editions, showcasing the interest in the book.

After the publication, Steuding continued his work as a teacher in Wurzen, before he became a headmaster in 1905 in Schneebergen. While working as a teacher he published multiple books, especially school books such as Die Behandlung der deutschen Nationalliteratur in der Oberprima des Gymnasiums, an den Hauptwerken des Goethes erläutert (English: The treatment of German national literature in the upper grades of the gymnasium, explained through the main works of Goethe) in 1998 focusing on school curricula. After becoming a headmaster, fewer publications were made, and after 1905 they were exclusively related to the new school. Only his inaugural speech and his speech regarding the twenty-fifth-year anniversary celebration of the school, as well as a report about it were published by him after 1905.

The topic has remained to be studied at the end of the 20th century, as multiple books by different authors were published dealing with Roman and Greek myths, but also ones focusing on the history of their religion.
