= Ptocheia =

Ancient Greek female spirit of beggary

Ptocheia or Ptokheia (pronounced pa-toh-KEE-uh; Ancient Greek: Πτωχεία) was the ancient Greek female spirit of beggary. She was regarded as a companion (and a sister) of Penia and Amechania. Her opposites were Euthenia and Ploutos.
