= Epiphron =

Figure in Hyginus's Fabulae

In Greek mythology, Epiphron (/ˈɛpɪfrɒn/ EP-if-ron; Ancient Greek: Ἐπίφρων [epípʰrɔːn], lit. 'prudence, care') was the daimon or spirit of prudence, shrewdness, thoughtfulness, carefulness, and sagacity. According to Hyginus, Epiphron was the son of Erebus (Darkness) and Nox (Night, the Roman equivalent of Nyx).
