= Greek mythology =

Body of myths originating in ancient Greece

Greek mythology is the body of myths originally told by the ancient Greeks, and a genre of ancient Greek folklore, today absorbed alongside Roman mythology into the broader designation of classical mythology. These stories concern the origin and nature of the world, the lives of deities, and heroes and the significance of the ancient Greeks' cult and ritual practices. Modern scholars study the myths to shed light on the religious and political institutions of ancient Greece, and to better understand the nature of mythmaking itself.

The Greek myths were initially propagated in an oral-poetic tradition most likely by Minoan and Mycenaean singers starting in the 18th century BC; eventually the myths of the heroes of the Trojan War and its aftermath became part of the oral tradition of Homer's epic poems, the Iliad and the Odyssey. Two poems by Homer's near contemporary Hesiod, the Theogony and the Works and Days, contain accounts of the genesis of the world, the succession of divine rulers, the succession of human ages, the origin of human woes, and the origin of sacrificial practices. Myths are also preserved in the Homeric Hymns, in fragments of epic poems of the Epic Cycle, in lyric poems, in the works of the tragedians and comedians of the fifth century BC, in writings of scholars and poets of the Hellenistic Age, and in texts from the time of the Roman Empire by writers such as Plutarch and Pausanias.

Aside from this narrative deposit in ancient Greek literature, pictorial representations of gods, heroes, and mythic episodes are featured prominently in ancient vase paintings and the decoration of votive gifts and many other artifacts. Geometric designs on pottery of the eighth century BC depict scenes from the Epic Cycle as well as the adventures of Heracles. In the succeeding Archaic, Classical, and Hellenistic periods, Homeric and various other mythological scenes appear, supplementing the existing literary evidence.

Greek mythology has had an extensive influence on the culture, arts, and literature of Western civilization and remains part of Western heritage and language. Poets and artists from ancient times to the present have derived inspiration from Greek mythology and have discovered contemporary significance and relevance in the themes.

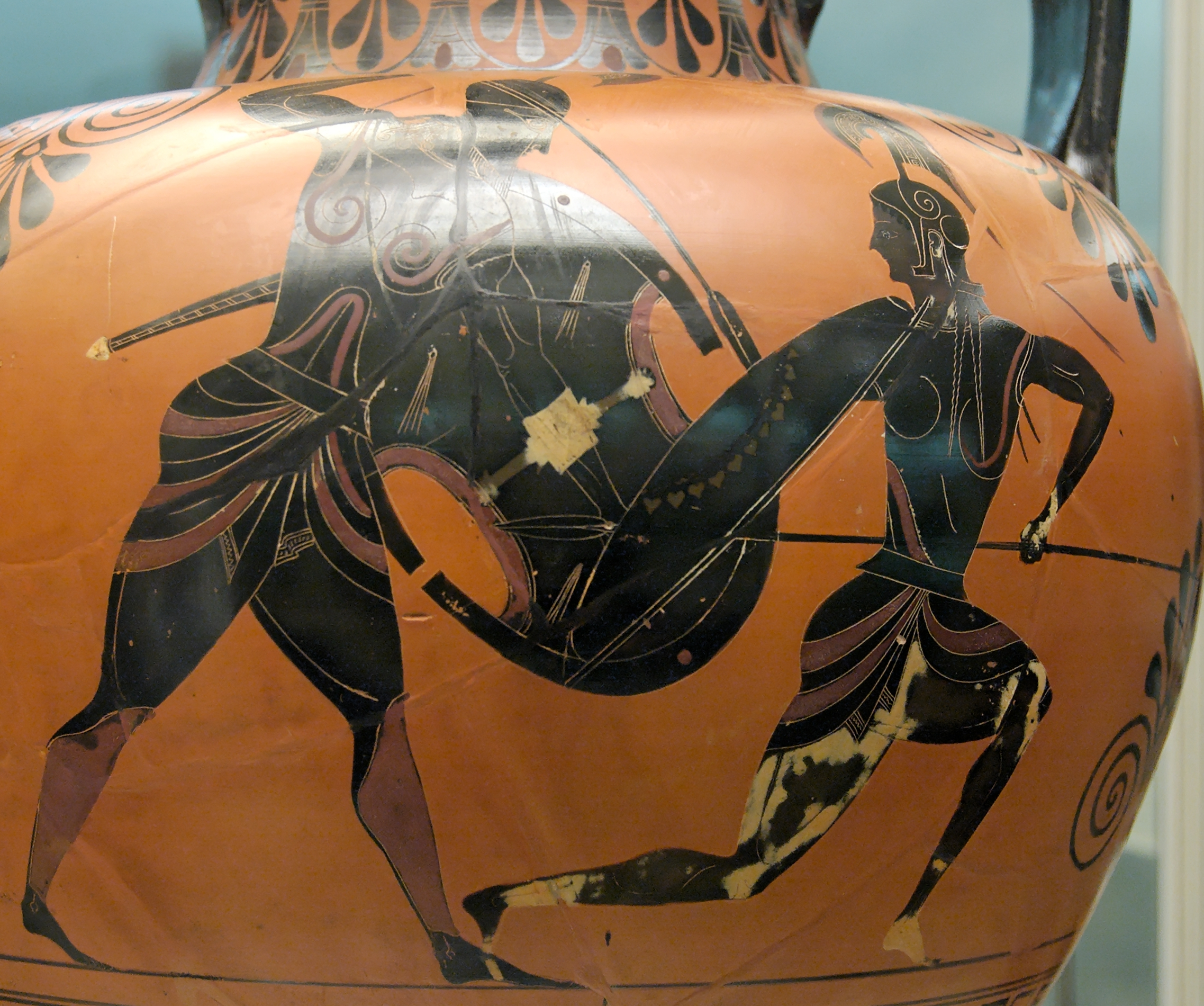
Achilles and Penthesileia by Exekias, c. 540 BC, British Museum, London

== Sources ==
Greek mythology is known today primarily from Greek literature and representations on visual media dating from the Geometric period from c. 900 BC to c. 800 BC onward. Literary and archaeological sources often intersect either reinforcing each other or other times presenting contradictions. Despite the absence of complete consensus, the available evidence points to the historical roots of Greek mythology.

=== Literary sources ===
Mythical narration plays an important role in nearly every genre of Greek literature. Nevertheless, the only general mythographical handbook to survive from Greek antiquity was the Library of Pseudo-Apollodorus. This work attempts to reconcile the contradictory tales of the poets and provides a grand summary of traditional Greek mythology and heroic legends. Apollodorus of Athens lived from c. 180 BC to c. 125 BC and wrote on many of these topics. His writings may have formed the basis for the collection; however, the "Library" discusses events that occurred long after his death, hence the name Pseudo-Apollodorus.

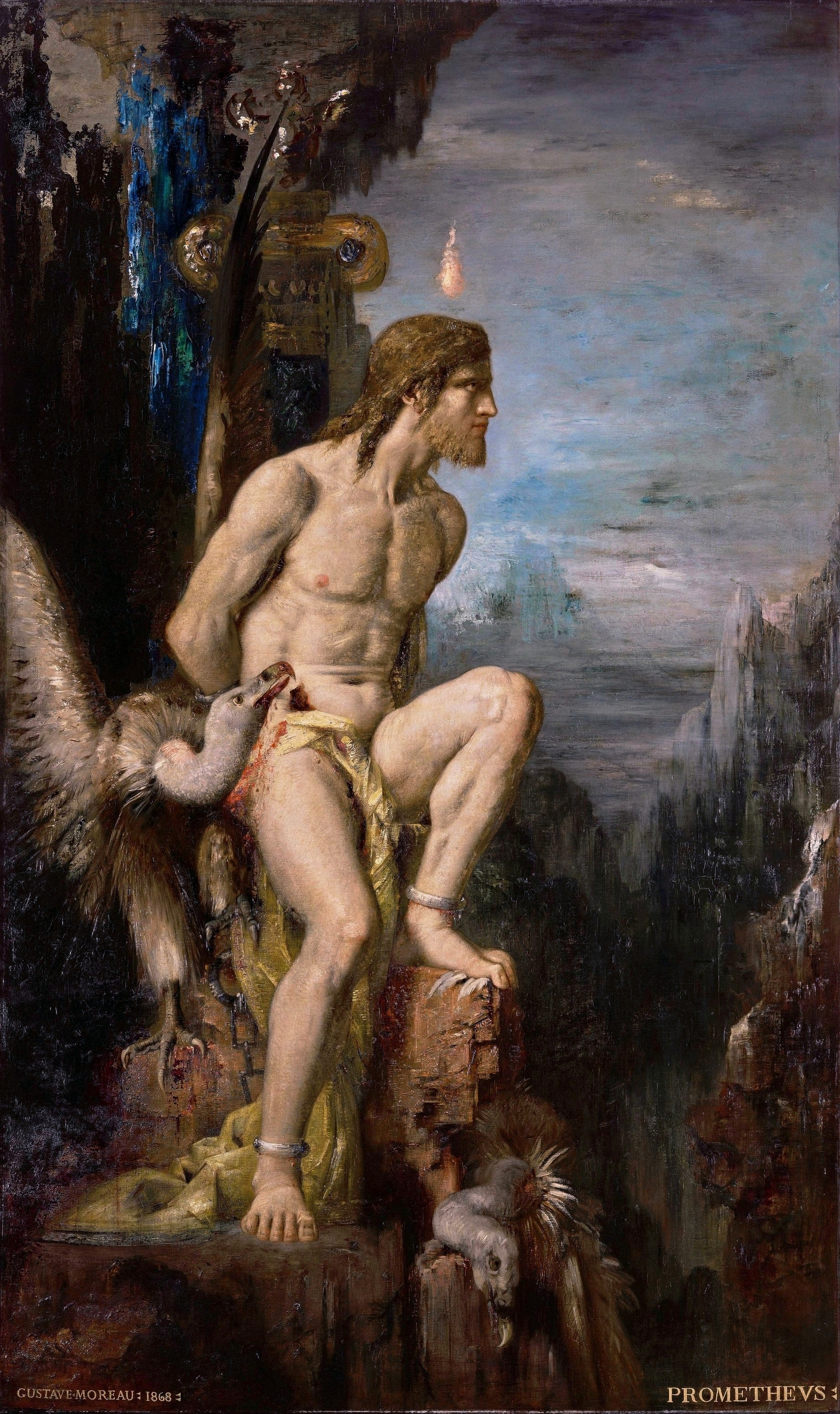
Prometheus (1868 by Gustave Moreau). The myth of Prometheus first was attested by Hesiod and then constituted the basis for a tragic trilogy of plays, possibly by Aeschylus, consisting of Prometheus Bound, Prometheus Unbound, and Prometheus Pyrphoros.

Among the earliest literary sources are Homer's two epic poems, the Iliad and the Odyssey. Other poets completed the Epic Cycle, but these later and lesser poems now are lost almost entirely. Despite their traditional name, the Homeric Hymns have no direct connection with Homer. The oldest are choral hymns from the earlier part of the so-called Lyric age. Hesiod, a possible contemporary with Homer, offers in his Theogony (Origin of the Gods) the fullest account of the earliest Greek myths, dealing with the creation of the world, the origin of the gods, Titans, and Giants, as well as elaborate genealogies, folktales, and aetiological myths. Hesiod's Works and Days, a didactic poem about farming life, also includes the myths of Prometheus, Pandora, and the Five Ages. The poet advises on the best way to succeed in a dangerous world, rendered yet more dangerous by its gods.

Lyrical poets often took their subjects from myth, but their treatment became gradually less narrative and more allusive. Greek lyric poets, including Pindar, Bacchylides and Simonides, and bucolic poets such as Theocritus and Bion, relate individual mythological incidents. Additionally, myth was central to classical Athenian drama. The tragic playwrights Aeschylus, Sophocles, and Euripides took most of their plots from myths of the age of heroes and the Trojan War. Many of the great tragic stories (e.g. Agamemnon and his children, Oedipus, Jason, Medea, etc.) took on their classic form in these tragedies. The comic playwright Aristophanes also used myths, in The Birds and The Frogs.

Historians Herodotus and Diodorus Siculus, and geographers Pausanias and Strabo, who traveled throughout the Greek world and noted the stories they heard, supplied numerous local myths and legends, often giving little-known alternative versions. Herodotus in particular, searched the various traditions he encountered and found the historical or mythological roots in the confrontation between Greece and the East. Herodotus attempted to reconcile origins and the blending of differing cultural concepts.

The poetry of the Hellenistic and Roman ages was primarily composed as a literary rather than cultic exercise. Nevertheless, it contains many important details that would otherwise be lost. This category includes the works of:

1. The Roman poets Ovid, Statius, Valerius Flaccus, Seneca and Virgil with Servius's commentary.
2. The Greek poets of the Late Antique period: Nonnus, Antoninus Liberalis, and Quintus Smyrnaeus.
3. The Greek poets of the Hellenistic period: Apollonius of Rhodes, Callimachus, Pseudo-Eratosthenes, and Parthenius.

Prose writers from the same periods who make reference to myths include Apuleius, Petronius, Lollianus, and Heliodorus. Two other important non-poetical sources are the Fabulae and Astronomica of the Roman writer styled as Pseudo-Hyginus, the Imagines of Philostratus the Elder and Philostratus the Younger, and the Descriptions of Callistratus.

Finally, several Byzantine Greek and various other writers provide important details of myth, much derived from earlier now lost Greek works. These preservers of myth include Arnobius, Hesychius, the author of the Suda, John Tzetzes, and Eustathius. They often treat mythology from a Christian moralizing perspective.

=== Archaeological sources ===
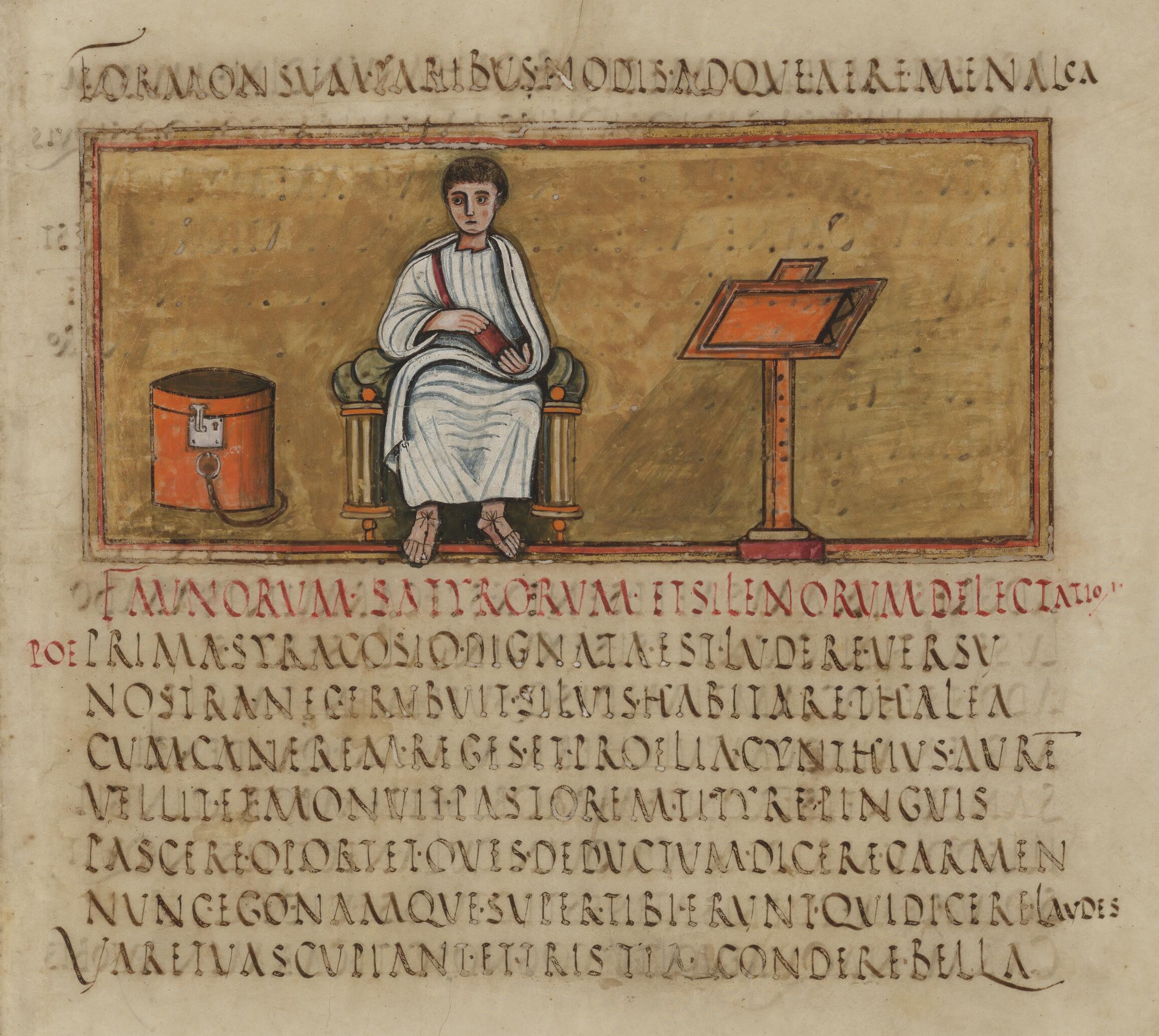
The Roman poet Virgil, here depicted in the fifth-century manuscript, the Vergilius Romanus, preserved details of Greek mythology in many of his writings.

The discovery of the Mycenaean civilization by the German amateur archaeologist Heinrich Schliemann in the nineteenth century, and the discovery of the Minoan civilization in Crete by the British archaeologist Arthur Evans in the twentieth century, helped to explain many existing questions about Homer's epics and provided archaeological evidence for many of the mythological details about gods and heroes. The evidence about myths and rituals at Mycenaean and Minoan sites is entirely monumental, as the Linear B script (an ancient form of Greek found in both Crete and mainland Greece) was used mainly to record inventories, although certain names of gods and heroes have been tentatively identified.

Geometric designs on pottery of the eighth-century BC depict scenes from the Trojan cycle, as well as the adventures of Heracles. These visual representations of myths are important for two reasons. Firstly, many Greek myths are attested on vases earlier than in literary sources: of the twelve labors of Heracles, for example, only the Cerberus adventure occurs in a contemporary literary text. Secondly, visual sources sometimes represent myths or mythical scenes that are not attested in any extant literary source. In some cases, the first known representation of a myth in geometric art predates its first known representation in late archaic poetry, by several centuries. In the Archaic (c. 750 – c. 500 BC), Classical (c. 480–323 BC), and Hellenistic (323–146 BC) periods, Homeric and various other mythological scenes appear, supplementing the existing literary evidence.

== Survey of mythic history ==
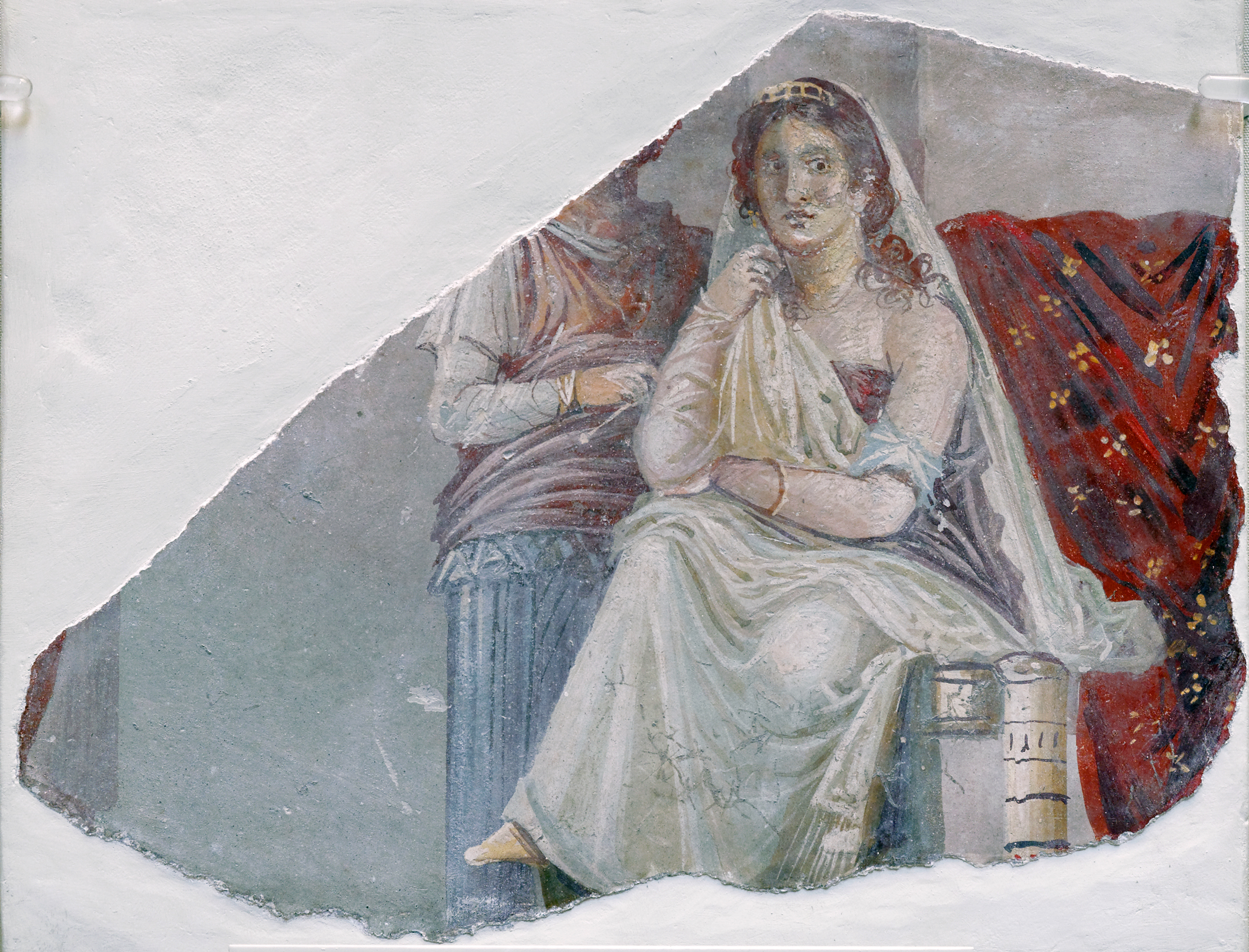
Phaedra with an attendant, probably her nurse, a fresco from Pompeii, c. 60 – c. 20 BC

The earlier inhabitants of the Balkan Peninsula were an agricultural people who, using animism, assigned a spirit to every aspect of nature. Eventually, these vague spirits assumed human forms and entered the local mythology as gods. When tribes from the north of the Balkan Peninsula invaded, they brought with them a new pantheon of gods, based on conquest, force, prowess in battle, and violent heroism. Other older gods of the agricultural world fused with those of the more powerful invaders or else faded into insignificance.

After the middle of the Archaic period, myths about relationships between male gods and male heroes became more and more frequent, indicating the parallel development of pedagogic pederasty (παιδικὸς ἔρως, eros paidikos), thought to have been introduced around 630 BC. By the end of the fifth-century BC, poets had assigned at least one eromenos, an adolescent boy who was their sexual companion, to every important god except Ares and many legendary figures. Previously existing myths, such as those of Achilles and Patroclus, also then were cast in a pederastic light. Alexandrian poets at first, then more generally literary mythographers in the early Roman Empire, often re-adapted stories of Greek mythological characters in this fashion.

The achievement of epic poetry was to create story-cycles and, as a result, to develop a new sense of mythological chronology. Thus, Greek mythology unfolds as a phase in the development of the world and of humans. While self-contradictions in these stories make an absolute timeline impossible, an approximate chronology may be discerned. The resulting mythological "history of the world" may be divided into three or four broader periods:

1. The myths of origin or age of gods (Theogonies, "births of gods"): myths about the origins of the world, the gods, and the human race.
2. The age when gods and mortals mingled freely: stories of the early interactions between gods, demigods, and mortals.
3. The age of heroes (heroic age), where divine activity was more limited. The last and greatest of the heroic legends is the story of the Trojan War and after (which is regarded by some researchers as a separate, fourth period).

While the age of gods often has been of more interest to contemporary students of myth, the Greek authors of the archaic and classical eras had a clear preference for the age of heroes, establishing a chronology and record of human accomplishments after the questions of how the world came into being were explained. For example, the heroic Iliad and Odyssey dwarfed the divine-focused Theogony and Homeric Hymns in both size and popularity. Under the influence of Homer the "hero cult" leads to a restructuring in spiritual life, expressed in the separation of the realm of the gods from the realm of the dead (heroes), of the Chthonic from the Olympian. In the Works and Days, Hesiod makes use of a scheme of Four Ages of Man (or Races): Golden, Silver, Bronze, and Iron. These races or ages are separate creations of the gods, the Golden Age belonging to the reign of Cronos, the subsequent races to the creation of Zeus. The presence of evil was explained by the myth of Pandora, when all of the best of human capabilities, save hope, had been spilled out of her overturned jar. In Metamorphoses, Ovid follows Hesiod's concept of the four ages.

=== Origins of the world and the gods ===
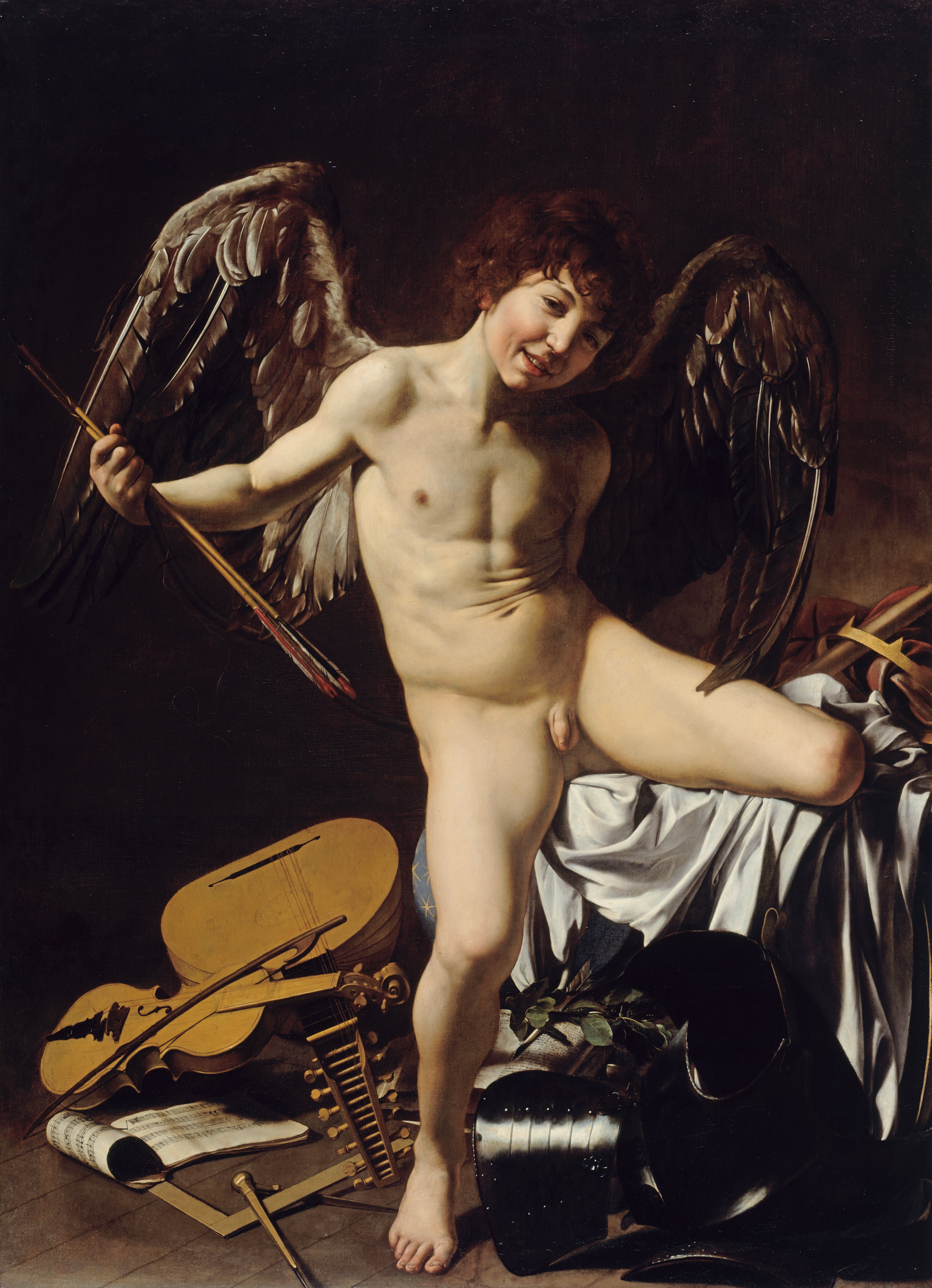
Amor Vincit Omnia (Love Conquers All), a depiction of the god of love, Eros. By Michelangelo Merisi da Caravaggio, circa 1601–1602.

"Myths of origin" or "creation myths" represent an attempt to explain the beginnings of the universe in human language. The most widely accepted version at the time, although a philosophical account of the beginning of things, is reported by Hesiod, in his Theogony. He begins with Chaos, a yawning nothingness. Next comes Gaia (Earth), "the ever-sure foundation of all", and then Tartarus, "in the depth of the wide-pathed Earth", and Eros (Love), "fairest among the deathless gods". Without male assistance, Gaia gave birth to Uranus (the Sky) who then fertilized her. From that union were born first the Titans—six males: Coeus, Crius, Cronus, Hyperion, Iapetus, and Oceanus; and six females: Mnemosyne, Phoebe, Rhea, Theia, Themis, and Tethys. After Cronus was born, Gaia and Uranus decreed no more Titans were to be born. They were followed by the one-eyed Cyclopes and the Hecatoncheires or Hundred-Handed Ones, who were both thrown into Tartarus by Uranus. This made Gaia furious. Cronus ("the wily, youngest and most terrible of Gaia's children") was convinced by Gaia to castrate his father. He did this and became the ruler of the Titans with his sister-wife, Rhea, as his consort, and the other Titans became his court.

A motif of father-against-son conflict was repeated when Cronus was confronted by his son, Zeus. Because Cronus had betrayed his father, he feared that his offspring would do the same, and so each time Rhea gave birth, he snatched up the child and ate it. Rhea hated this and tricked him by hiding Zeus and wrapping a stone in a baby's blanket, which Cronus ate. When Zeus was full-grown, he fed Cronus a drugged drink which caused him to vomit, throwing up Rhea's other children, including Poseidon, Hades, Hestia, Demeter, and Hera, and the stone, which had been sitting in Cronus's stomach all this time. Zeus then challenged Cronus to war for the kingship of the gods. At last, with the help of the Cyclopes (whom Zeus freed from Tartarus), Zeus and his siblings were victorious, while Cronus and the Titans were hurled down to imprisonment in Tartarus.

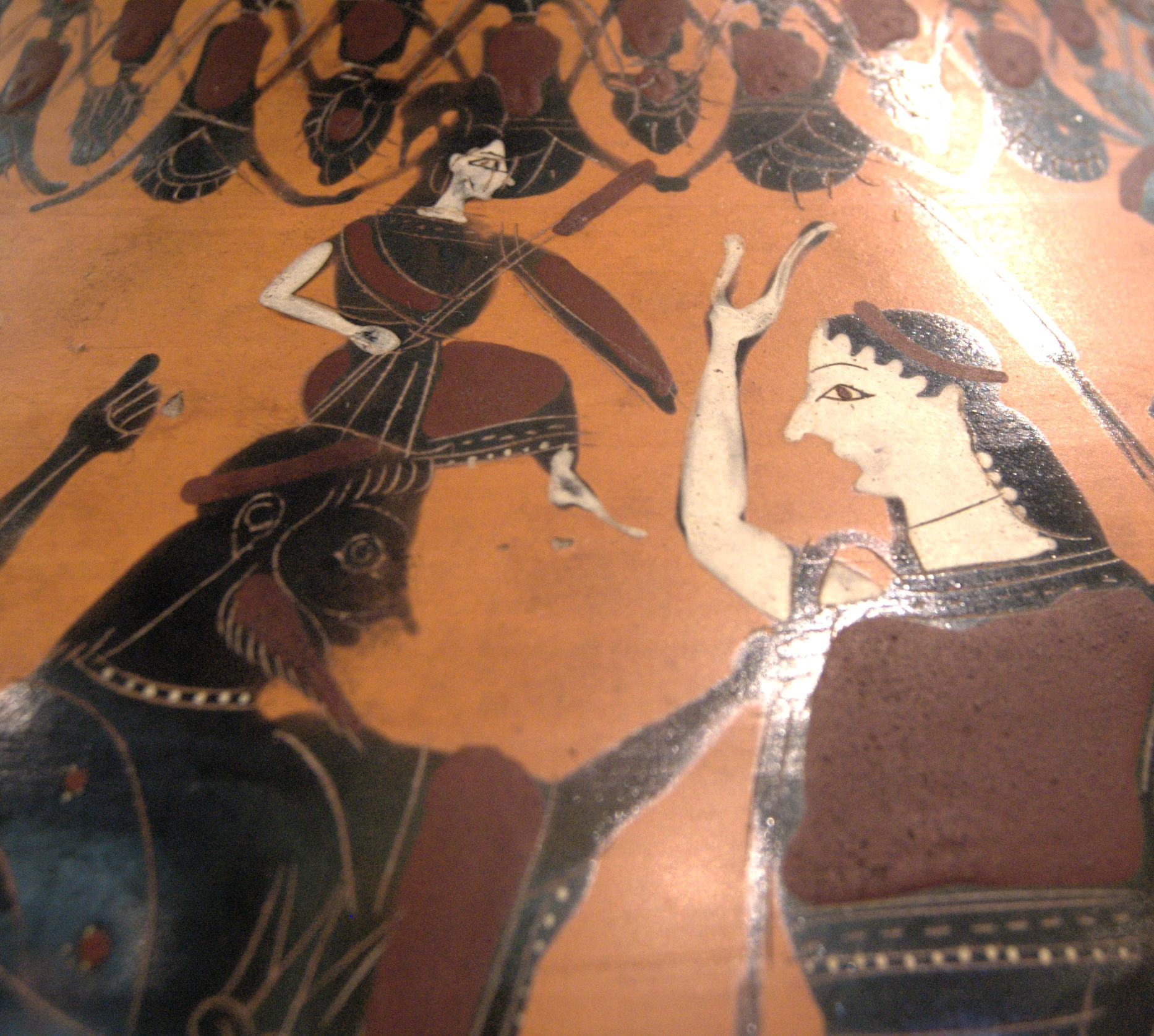
Attic black-figured amphora depicting Athena being "reborn" from the head of Zeus, who had swallowed her mother Metis, on the right, Eileithyia, the goddess of childbirth, assists, circa 550–525 BC (Musée du Louvre, Paris)

Zeus was plagued by the same concern, and after a prophecy that the offspring of his first wife, Metis, would give birth to a god "greater than he", Zeus swallowed her. She was already pregnant with Athena, however, and she burst forth from his head—fully-grown and dressed for war.

The earliest Greek thought about poetry considered the theogonies to be the prototypical poetic genre—the prototypical mythos—and imputed almost magical powers to it. Orpheus, the archetypal poet, also was the archetypal singer of theogonies, which he uses to calm seas and storms in Apollonius' Argonautica, and to move the stony hearts of the underworld gods in his descent to Hades. When Hermes invents the lyre in the Homeric Hymn to Hermes, the first thing he does is sing about the birth of the gods. Hesiod's Theogony is not only the fullest surviving account of the gods but also the fullest surviving account of the archaic poet's function, with its long preliminary invocation to the Muses. Theogony also was the subject of many lost poems, including those attributed to Orpheus, Musaeus, Epimenides, Abaris, and other legendary seers, which were used in private ritual purifications and mystery-rites. There are indications that Plato was familiar with some version of the Orphic theogony. A silence would have been expected about religious rites and beliefs, however, and that nature of the culture would not have been reported by members of the society while the beliefs were held. After they ceased to become religious beliefs, few would have known the rites and rituals. Allusions often existed, however, to aspects that were quite public.

Images existed on pottery and religious artwork that were interpreted and more likely, misinterpreted in many diverse myths and tales. A few fragments of these works survive in quotations by Neoplatonist philosophers and recently unearthed papyrus scraps. One of these scraps, the Derveni Papyrus, now proves that at least in the fifth-century BC a theogonic-cosmogonic poem of Orpheus was in existence.

The first philosophical cosmologists reacted against, or sometimes built upon, popular mythical conceptions that had existed in the Greek world for some time. Some of these popular conceptions can be gleaned from the poetry of Homer and Hesiod. In Homer, the Earth was viewed as a flat disk afloat on the river of Oceanus and overlooked by a hemispherical sky with sun, moon, and stars. The Sun (Helios) traversed the heavens as a charioteer and sailed around the Earth in a golden bowl at night. Sun, earth, heaven, rivers, and winds could be addressed in prayers and called to witness oaths. Natural fissures were popularly regarded as entrances to the subterranean house of Hades and his predecessors, home of the dead. Influences from other cultures always afforded new themes.

==== Greek pantheon ====
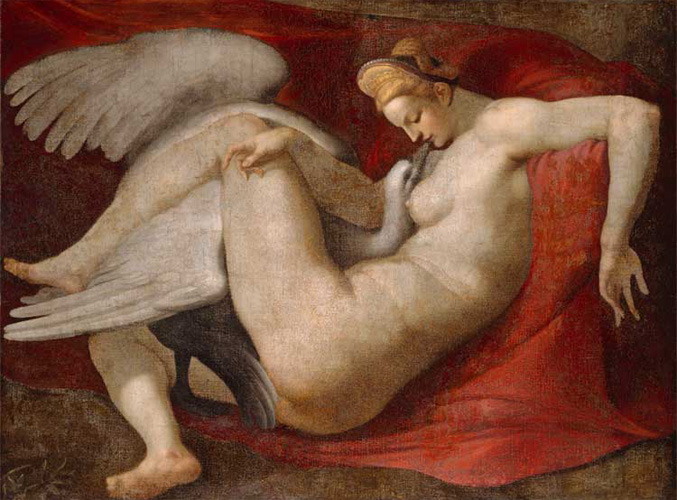
Zeus, disguised as a swan, seduces Leda, the Queen of Sparta. A sixteenth-century copy of the lost original by Michelangelo.

According to Classical-era mythology, after the overthrow of the Titans, the new pantheon of gods and goddesses was confirmed. Among the principal Greek gods were the Olympians, residing on Mount Olympus under the eye of Zeus. (The limitation of their number to twelve seems to have been a comparatively modern idea.) Besides the Olympians, the Greeks worshipped various gods of the countryside, the satyr-god Pan, Nymphs (spirits of rivers), Naiads (who dwelled in springs), Dryads (who were spirits of the trees), Nereids (who inhabited the sea), river gods, Satyrs, and others. In addition, there were the dark powers of the underworld, such as the Erinyes (or Furies), said to pursue those guilty of crimes against blood-relatives. In order to honor the Ancient Greek pantheon, poets composed the Homeric Hymns (a group of thirty-three songs). Gregory Nagy (1992) regards "the larger Homeric Hymns as simple preludes (compared with Theogony), each of which invokes one god."

The gods of Greek mythology are described as having essentially corporeal but ideal bodies. According to Walter Burkert, the defining characteristic of Greek anthropomorphism is that "the Greek gods are persons, not abstractions, ideas or concepts." Regardless of their underlying forms, the Ancient Greek gods have many fantastic abilities; most significantly, the gods are not affected by disease and can be wounded only under highly unusual circumstances. The Greeks considered immortality as the distinctive characteristic of their gods; this immortality, as well as unfading youth, was insured by the constant use of nectar and ambrosia, by which the divine blood was renewed in their veins.

Each god descends from their own genealogy, pursues differing interests, has a certain area of expertise, and is governed by a unique personality; however, these descriptions arise from a multiplicity of archaic local variants, which do not always agree with one another. When these gods are called upon in poetry, prayer, or cult, they are referred to by a combination of their name and epithets, that identify them by these distinctions from other manifestations of themselves (e.g., Apollo Musagetes is "Apollo, [as] leader of the Muses"). Alternatively, the epithet may identify a particular and localized aspect of the god, sometimes thought to be already ancient during the classical epoch of Greece.

Most gods were associated with specific aspects of life. For example, Aphrodite was the goddess of love and beauty, Ares was the god of war, Hades the ruler of the underworld, and Athena the goddess of wisdom and courage. Some gods, such as Apollo and Dionysus, revealed complex personalities and mixtures of functions, while others, such as Hestia (literally "hearth") and Helios (literally "sun"), were little more than personifications. The most impressive temples tended to be dedicated to a limited number of gods, who were the focus of large pan-Hellenic cults. It was, however, common for individual regions and villages to devote their own cults to minor gods. Many cities also honored the more well-known gods with unusual local rites and associated strange myths with them that were unknown elsewhere. During the heroic age, the cult of heroes (or demigods) supplemented that of the gods.

=== Age of gods and mortals ===
Bridging the age when gods lived alone and the age when divine interference in human affairs was limited was a transitional age in which gods and mortals moved together. These were the early days of the world when the groups mingled more freely than they did later. Most of these tales were later told by Ovid's Metamorphoses and they are often divided into two thematic groups: tales of love and tales of punishment.

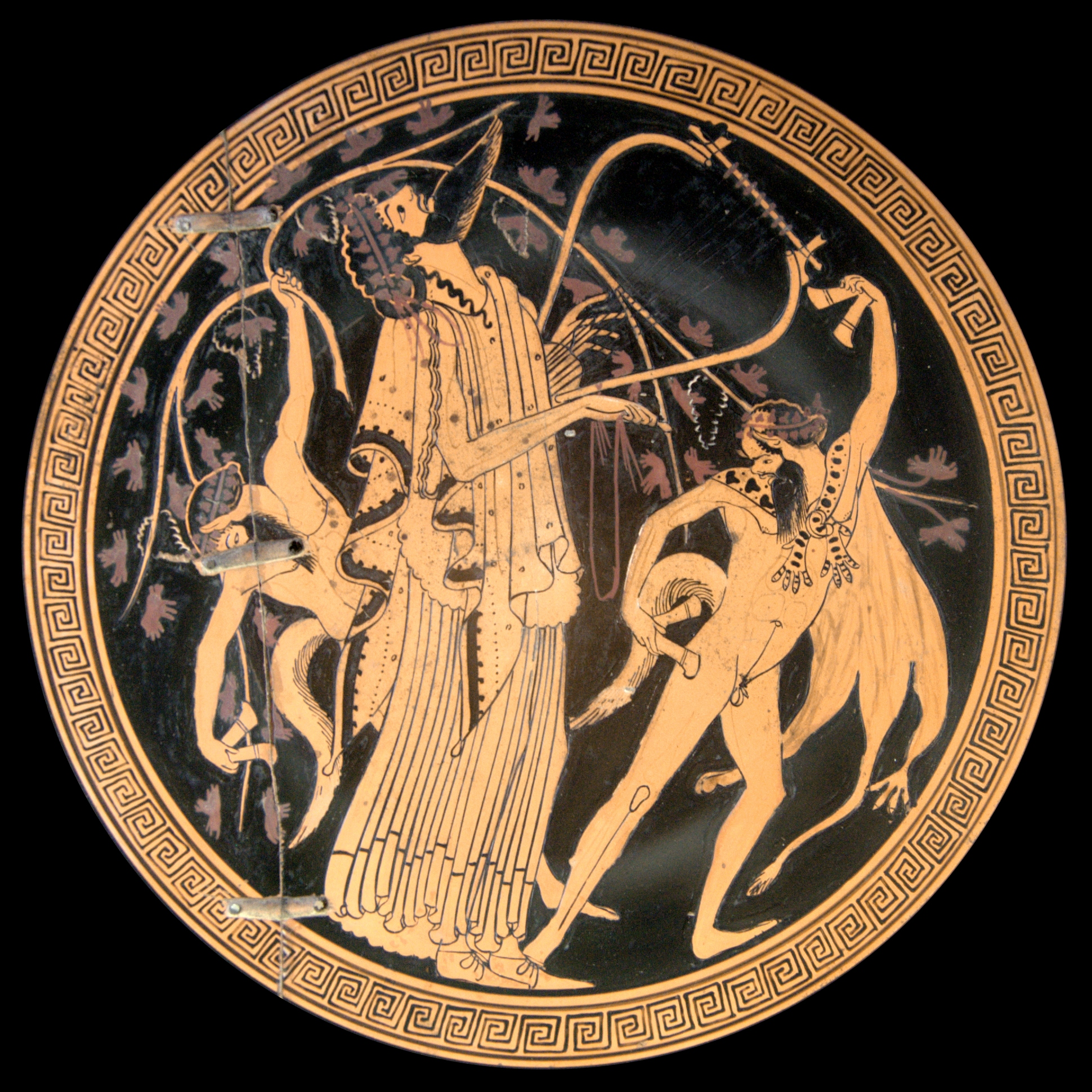
Dionysus with satyrs. Interior of a cup painted by the Brygos Painter, Cabinet des Médailles.

Tales of love often involve incest, or the seduction or rape of a mortal woman by a male god, resulting in heroic offspring. The stories generally suggest that relationships between gods and mortals are something to avoid; even consenting relationships rarely have happy endings. In a few cases, a female divinity mates with a mortal man, as in the Homeric Hymn to Aphrodite, where the goddess lies with Anchises to produce Aeneas.

The second type (tales of punishment) involves the appropriation or invention of some important cultural artifact, as when Prometheus steals fire from the gods, when Tantalus steals nectar and ambrosia from Zeus' table and gives it to his subjects—revealing to them the secrets of the gods, when Prometheus or Lycaon invents sacrifice, when Demeter teaches agriculture and the Mysteries to Triptolemus, or when Marsyas invents the aulos and enters into a musical contest with Apollo. Ian Morris considers Prometheus' adventures as "a place between the history of the gods and that of man." An anonymous papyrus fragment, dated to the third century, vividly portrays Dionysus' punishment of the king of Thrace, Lycurgus, whose recognition of the new god came too late, resulting in horrific penalties that extended into the afterlife. The story of the arrival of Dionysus to establish his cult in Thrace was also the subject of an Aeschylean trilogy. In another tragedy, Euripides' The Bacchae, the king of Thebes, Pentheus, is punished by Dionysus, because he disrespected the god and spied on his Maenads, the female worshippers of the god.

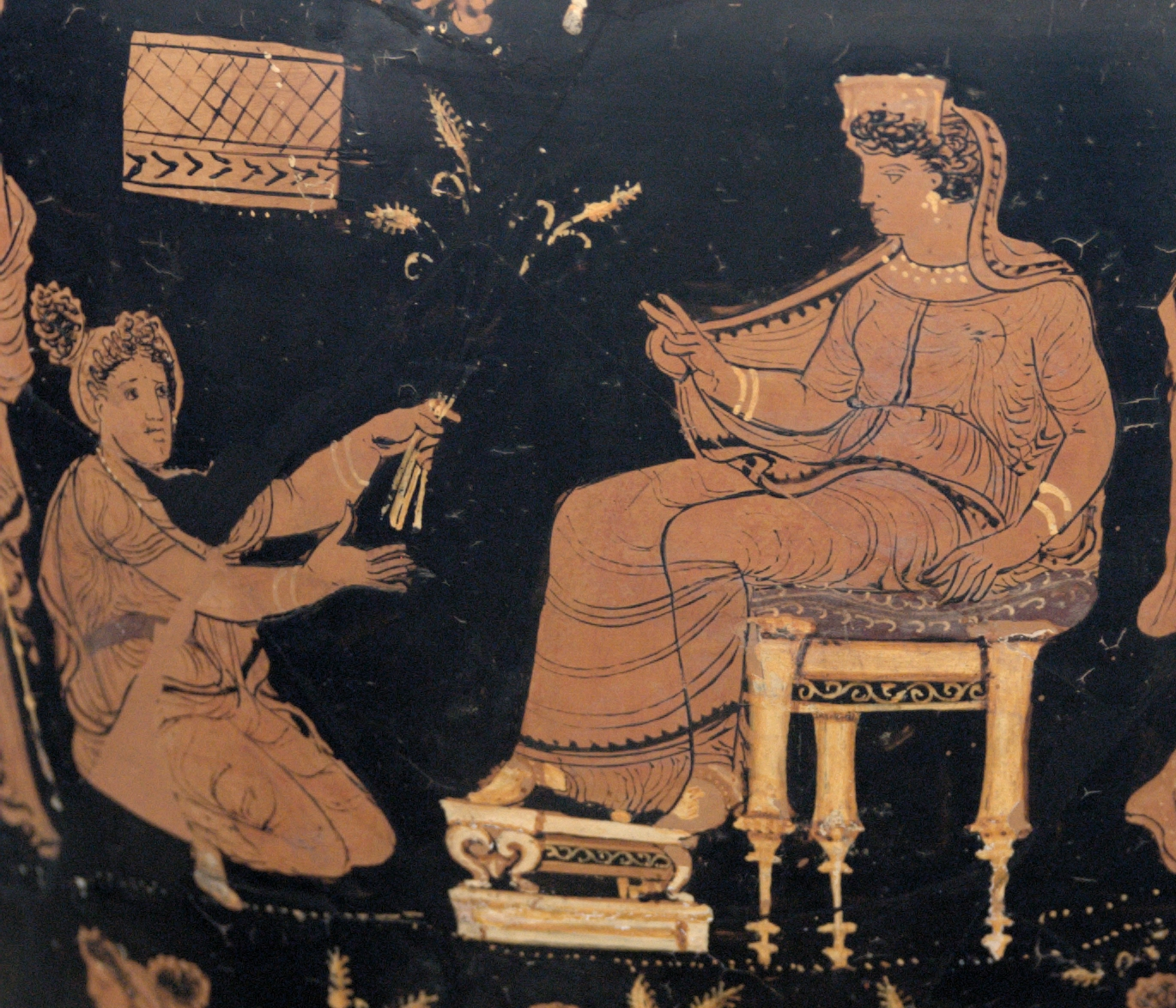
Demeter and Metanira in a detail on an Apulian red-figure hydria, circa 340 BC (Altes Museum, Berlin)

In another story, based on an old folktale motif and echoing a similar theme, Demeter was searching for her daughter, Persephone, having taken the form of an old woman called Doso, and received a hospitable welcome from Celeus, the King of Eleusis in Attica. As a gift to Celeus, because of his hospitality, Demeter planned to make his son Demophon a god, but she was unable to complete the ritual because his mother Metanira walked in and saw her son in the fire and screamed in fright, which angered Demeter, who lamented that foolish mortals do not understand the concept and ritual.

=== Heroic age ===
The age in which the heroes lived is known as the Heroic Age. The epic and genealogical poetry created cycles of stories clustered around particular heroes or events and established the family relationships between the heroes of different stories; they thus arranged the stories in sequence. According to Ken Dowden (1992), "there is even a saga effect: we can follow the fates of some families in successive generations."

After the rise of the hero cult, gods and heroes constitute the sacral sphere and are invoked together in oaths and prayers which are addressed to them. Burkert (2002) notes that "the roster of heroes, again in contrast to the gods, is never given fixed and final form. Great gods are no longer born, but new heroes can always be raised up from the army of the dead." Another important difference between the hero cult and the cult of gods is that the hero becomes the centre of local group identity.

The monumental events of Heracles are regarded as the dawn of the age of heroes. To the Heroic Age are also ascribed three great events: the Argonautic expedition, the Theban Cycle, and the Trojan War.

==== Heracles and the Heracleidae ====
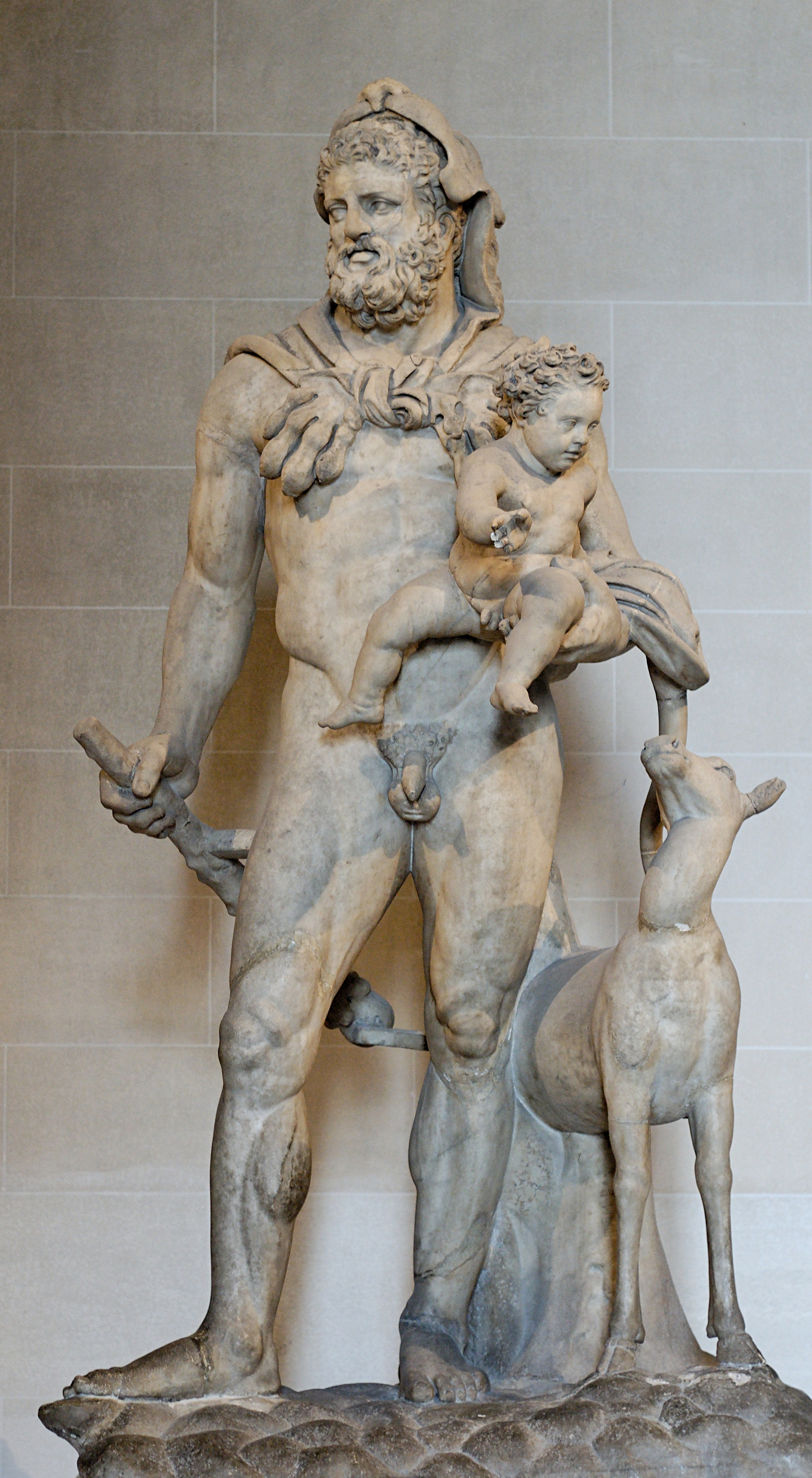
Heracles with his baby Telephus (Louvre Museum, Paris)

Some scholars believe that behind Heracles' complicated mythology there was probably a real man, perhaps a chieftain-vassal of the kingdom of Argos. Some scholars suggest the story of Heracles is an allegory for the sun's yearly passage through the twelve constellations of the zodiac. Others point to earlier myths from other cultures, showing the story of Heracles as a local adaptation of hero myths already well established. Traditionally, Heracles was the son of Zeus and Alcmene, granddaughter of Perseus. His fantastic solitary exploits, with their many folk-tale themes, provided much material for popular legend. According to Burkert (2002), "He is portrayed as a sacrificer, mentioned as a founder of altars, and imagined as a voracious eater himself; it is in this role that he appears in comedy.

While his tragic end provided much material for tragedy—Heracles is regarded by Thalia Papadopoulou as "a play of great significance in examination of other Euripidean dramas." In art and literature, Heracles was represented as an enormously strong man of moderate height; his characteristic weapon was the bow but frequently also the club. Vase paintings demonstrate the unparalleled popularity of Heracles, his fight with the lion being depicted many hundreds of times.

Heracles also entered Etruscan and Roman mythology and cult, and the exclamation "mehercule" became as familiar to the Romans as "Herakleis" was to the Greeks. In Italy he was worshipped as a god of merchants and traders, although others also prayed to him for his characteristic gifts of good luck or rescue from danger.

Heracles attained the highest social prestige through his appointment as official ancestor of the Dorian kings. This probably served as a legitimation for the Dorian migrations into the Peloponnese. Hyllus, the eponymous hero of one Dorian phyle, became the son of Heracles and one of the Heracleidae or Heraclids (the numerous descendants of Heracles, especially the descendants of Hyllus—other Heracleidae included Macaria, Lamos, Manto, Bianor, Tlepolemus, and Telephus). These Heraclids conquered the Peloponnesian kingdoms of Mycenae, Sparta and Argos, claiming, according to legend, a right to rule them through their ancestor. Their rise to dominance is frequently called the "Dorian invasion". The Lydian and later the Macedonian kings, as rulers of the same rank, also became Heracleidae.

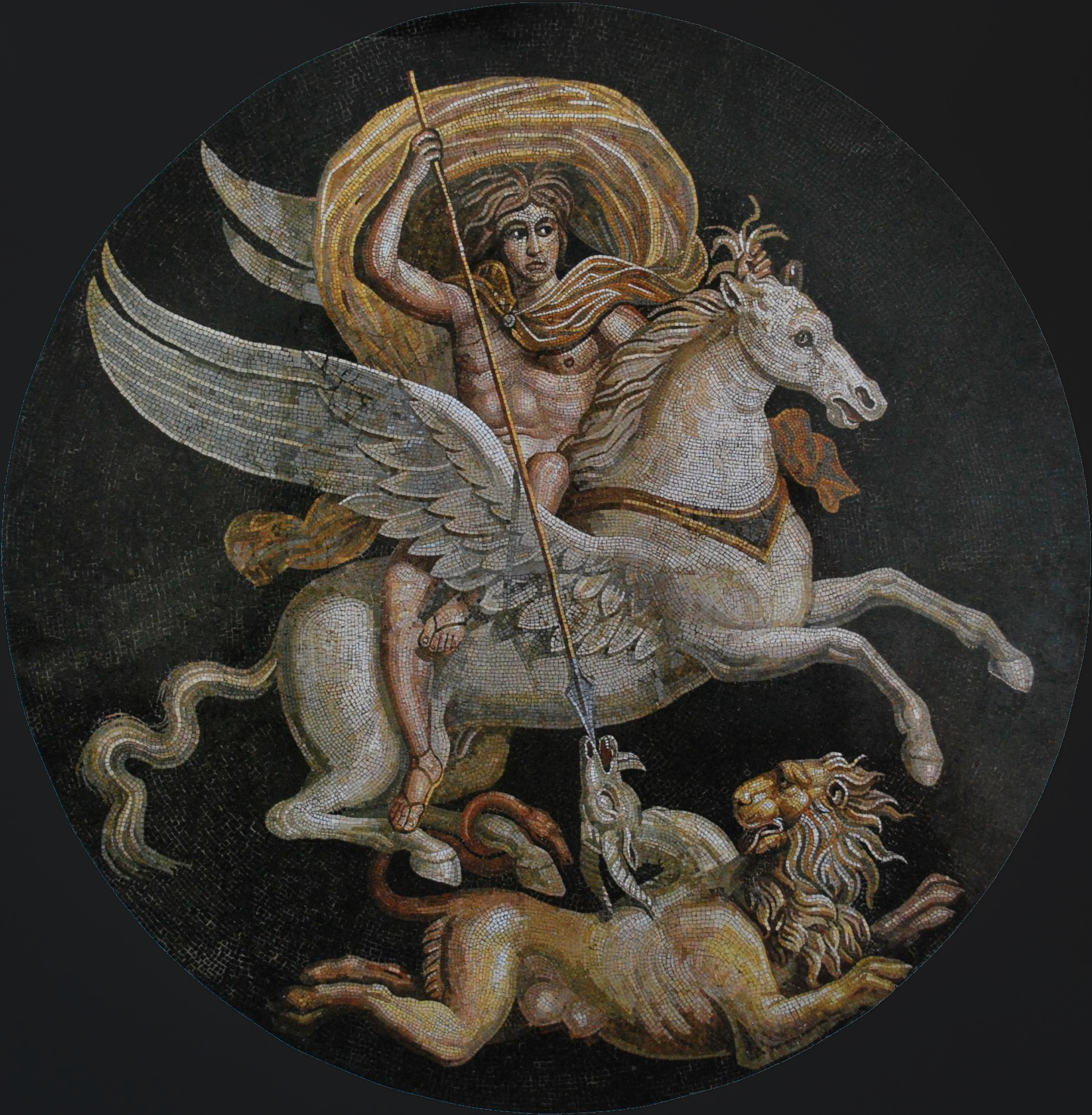
Bellerophon riding Pegasus and slaying the Chimera, central medallion of a Roman mosaic from Autun, Musée Rolin, 2nd to 3rd century AD

Other members of this earliest generation of heroes such as Perseus, Deucalion, Theseus and Bellerophon, have many traits in common with Heracles. Like him, their exploits are solitary, fantastic and border on fairy tale, as they slay monsters such as the Chimera and Medusa. Bellerophon's adventures are commonplace types, similar to the adventures of Heracles and Theseus. Sending a hero to his presumed death is also a recurrent theme of this early heroic tradition, used in the cases of Perseus and Bellerophon.

==== Argonauts ====
The only surviving Hellenistic epic, the Argonautica of Apollonius of Rhodes (epic poet, scholar, and director of the Library of Alexandria) tells the myth of the voyage of Jason and the Argonauts to retrieve the Golden Fleece from the mythical land of Colchis. In the Argonautica, Jason is impelled on his quest by king Pelias, who receives a prophecy that a man with one sandal would be his nemesis. Jason loses a sandal in a river, arrives at the court of Pelias, and the epic is set in motion. Nearly every member of the next generation of heroes, as well as Heracles, went with Jason in the ship Argo to fetch the Golden Fleece. This generation also included Theseus, who went to Crete to slay the Minotaur; Atalanta, the female heroine, and Meleager, who once had an epic cycle of his own to rival the Iliad and Odyssey. Pindar, Apollonius and the Bibliotheca endeavor to give full lists of the Argonauts.

Although Apollonius wrote his poem in the 3rd century BC, the composition of the story of the Argonauts is earlier than Odyssey, which shows familiarity with the exploits of Jason (the wandering of Odysseus may have been partly founded on it). In ancient times, the expedition was regarded as a historical fact, an incident in the opening up of the Black Sea to Greek commerce and colonization. It was also extremely popular, forming a cycle to which a number of local legends became attached. The story of Medea, in particular, caught the imagination of the tragic poets.

==== House of Atreus and Theban Cycle ====
In between the Argo and the Trojan War, there was a generation known chiefly for its horrific crimes. This includes the doings of Atreus and Thyestes at Argos. Behind the myth of the house of Atreus (one of the two principal heroic dynasties with the house of Labdacus) lies the problem of the devolution of power and of the mode of accession to sovereignty. The twins Atreus and Thyestes with their descendants played the leading role in the tragedy of the devolution of power in Mycenae.

The Theban Cycle deals with events associated especially with Cadmus, the city's founder, and later with the doings of Laius and Oedipus at Thebes; a series of stories that lead to the war of the Seven against Thebes and the eventual pillage of that city at the hands of the Epigoni. (It is not known whether the Seven figured in early epic.) As far as Oedipus is concerned, early epic accounts seem to have him continuing to rule at Thebes after the revelation that Iokaste was his mother, and subsequently marrying a second wife who becomes the mother of his children—markedly different from the tale known to us through tragedy (e.g. Sophocles' Oedipus Rex) and later mythological accounts.

==== Trojan War and aftermath ====
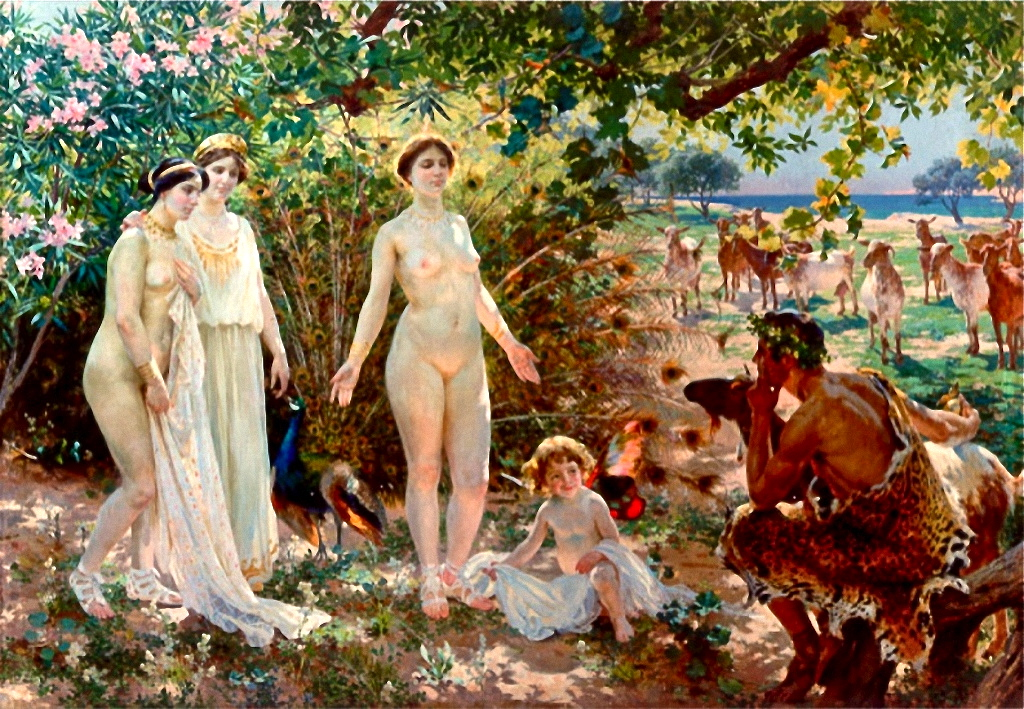
El Juicio de Paris by Enrique Simonet, 1904. Paris is holding the golden apple on his right hand while surveying the goddesses in a calculative manner.

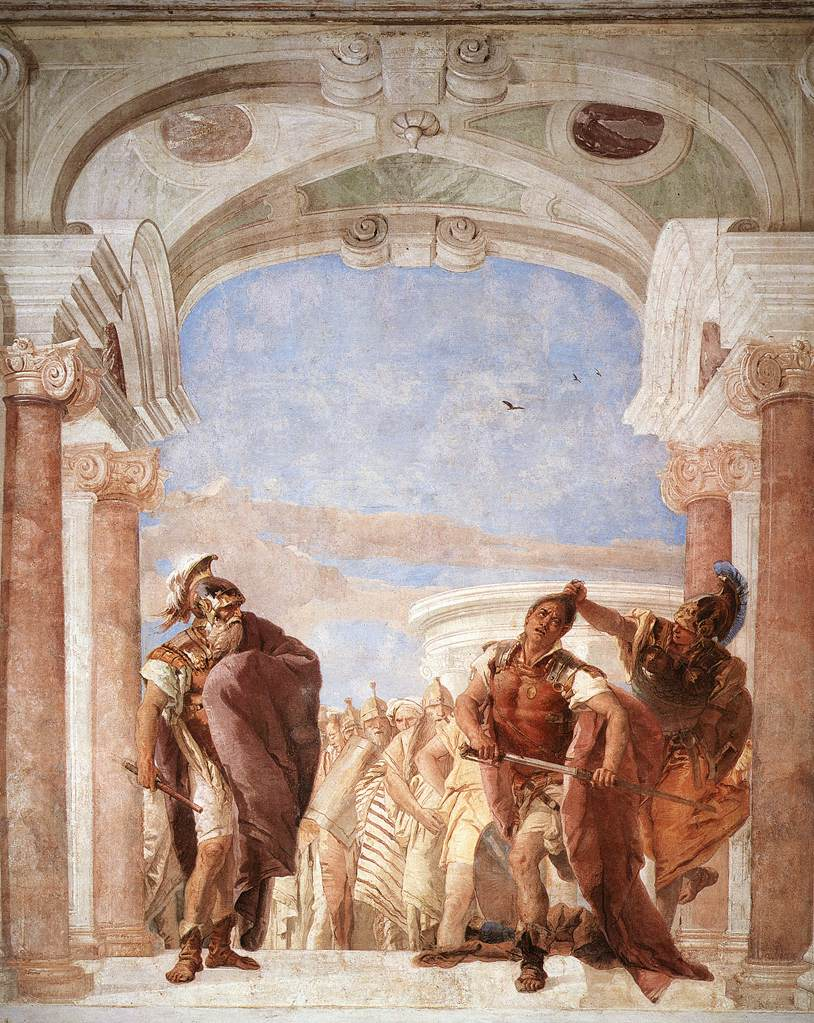
In The Rage of Achilles by Giovanni Battista Tiepolo (1757, Fresco, 300 x 300 cm, Villa Valmarana, Vicenza) Achilles is outraged that Agamemnon would threaten to seize his warprize, Briseis, and he draws his sword to kill Agamemnon. The sudden appearance of the goddess Athena, who, in this fresco, has grabbed Achilles by the hair, prevents the act of violence.

Greek mythology culminates in the Trojan War, fought between Greece and Troy, and its aftermath. In Homer's works, such as the Iliad, the chief stories have already taken shape and substance, and individual themes were elaborated later, especially in Greek drama. The Trojan War also elicited great interest in the Roman culture because of the story of Aeneas, a Trojan hero whose journey from Troy led to the founding of the city that would one day become Rome, as recounted in Virgil's Aeneid (Book II of Virgil's Aeneid contains the best-known account of the sack of Troy). Finally there are two pseudo-chronicles written in Latin that passed under the names of Dictys Cretensis and Dares Phrygius.

The Trojan War cycle, a collection of epic poems, starts with the events leading up to the war: Eris and the golden apple of Kallisti, the Judgement of Paris, the abduction of Helen, the sacrifice of Iphigenia at Aulis. To recover Helen, the Greeks launched a great expedition under the overall command of Menelaus's brother, Agamemnon, king of Argos, or Mycenae, but the Trojans refused to return Helen. The Iliad, which is set in the tenth year of the war, tells of the quarrel between Agamemnon and Achilles, who was the finest Greek warrior, and the consequent deaths in battle of Achilles' beloved comrade Patroclus and Priam's eldest son, Hector. After Hector's death, the Trojans were joined by two exotic allies, Penthesilea, queen of the Amazons, and Memnon, king of the Ethiopians and son of the dawn-goddess, Eos. Achilles killed both of these, but Paris then managed to kill Achilles with an arrow in the heel. Achilles' heel was the only part of his body which was not invulnerable to damage by human weaponry. Before they could take Troy, the Greeks had to steal from the citadel the wooden image of Pallas Athena (the Palladium). Finally, with Athena's help, they built the Trojan Horse. Despite the warnings of Priam's daughter Cassandra, the Trojans were persuaded by Sinon, a Greek who feigned desertion, to take the horse inside the walls of Troy as an offering to Athena; the priest Laocoon, who tried to have the horse destroyed, was killed by sea-serpents. At night the Greek fleet returned, and the Greeks from the horse opened the gates of Troy. In the total sack that followed, Priam and his remaining sons were slaughtered; the Trojan women passed into slavery in various cities of Greece. The adventurous homeward voyages of the Greek leaders (including the wanderings of Odysseus and Aeneas (the Aeneid), and the murder of Agamemnon) were told in two epics, the Returns (the lost Nostoi) and Homer's Odyssey. The Trojan cycle also includes the adventures of the children of the Trojan generation (e.g., Orestes and Telemachus).

The Trojan War provided a variety of themes and became a main source of inspiration for Ancient Greek artists (e.g. metopes on the Parthenon depicting the sack of Troy); this artistic preference for themes deriving from the Trojan Cycle indicates its importance to the Ancient Greek civilization. The same mythological cycle also inspired a series of later European literary writings. For instance, Trojan Medieval European writers, unacquainted with Homer at first hand, found in the Troy legend a rich source of heroic and romantic storytelling and a convenient framework into which to fit their own courtly and chivalric ideals. Twelfth-century authors, such as Benoît de Sainte-Maure (Roman de Troie [Romance of Troy, 1154–60]) and Joseph of Exeter (De Bello Troiano [On the Trojan War, 1183]) describe the war while rewriting the standard version they found in Dictys and Dares. They thus follow Horace's advice and Virgil's example: they rewrite a poem of Troy instead of telling something completely new.

Some of the more famous heroes noted for their inclusion in the Trojan War were:

On the Trojan side:

- Aeneas
- Hector
- Paris

On the Greek side:

- Ajax (there were two Ajaxes)
- Achilles
- King Agamemnon
- Menelaus
- Odysseus
- Diomedes

== Greek and Roman conceptions of myth ==
Mythology was at the heart of everyday life in Ancient Greece. Greeks regarded mythology as a part of their history. They used myth to explain natural phenomena, cultural variations, traditional enmities, and friendships. It was a source of pride to be able to trace the descent of one's leaders from a mythological hero or a god. Few ever doubted that there was truth behind the account of the Trojan War in the Iliad and Odyssey. According to Victor Davis Hanson, a military historian, columnist, political essayist, and former classics professor, and John Heath, a classics professor, the profound knowledge of the Homeric epos was deemed by the Greeks the basis of their acculturation. Homer was the "education of Greece" (Ἑλλάδος παίδευσις), and his poetry "the Book".

=== Philosophy and myth ===
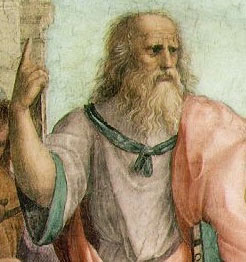
Plato in Raphael's The School of Athens

After the rise of philosophy, history, prose and rationalism in the late 5th century BC, the role of myth became less certain, and mythological genealogies gave place to a conception of history which tried to exclude the supernatural (such as the Thucydidean history). While poets and dramatists were reworking the myths, Greek historians and philosophers were beginning to criticize them.

By the 6th century BC, a few radical philosophers were already beginning to label the poets' tales as blasphemous lies: Xenophanes of Colophon complained that Homer and Hesiod attributed to the gods "all that is shameful and disgraceful among men; they steal, commit adultery, and deceive one another." This line of thought found its most sweeping expression in Plato's Republic and Laws. Plato created his own allegorical myths (such as the vision of Er in the Republic), attacked the traditional tales of the gods' tricks, thefts, and adulteries as immoral, and objected to their central role in literature. Plato's criticism was the first serious challenge to the Homeric mythological tradition; he referred to the myths as "old wives' chatter". For his part, Aristotle criticized the pre-Socratic quasi-mythical philosophical approach and underscored that "Hesiod and the theological writers were concerned only with what seemed plausible to themselves, and had no respect for us ... But it is not worth taking seriously writers who show off in the mythical style; as for those who do proceed by proving their assertions, we must cross-examine them."

Nevertheless, even Plato did not manage to wean himself and his society from the influence of myth; his own characterization of Socrates is based on the traditional Homeric and tragic patterns, used by the philosopher to praise the righteous life of his teacher:

But perhaps someone might say: "Are you then not ashamed, Socrates, of having followed such a pursuit, that you are now in danger of being put to death as a result?" But I should make to him a just reply: "You do not speak well, Sir, if you think a man in whom there is even a little merit ought to consider danger of life or death, and not rather regard this only, when he does things, whether the things he does are right or wrong and the acts of a good or a bad man. For according to your argument all the demigods would be bad who died at Troy, including the son of Thetis, who so despised danger, in comparison with enduring any disgrace, that when his mother (and she was a goddess) said to him, as he was eager to slay Hector, something like this, I believe,

My son, if you avenge the death of your friend Patroclus and kill Hector, you yourself shall die; for straightway, after Hector, is death appointed unto you. (Hom. Il. 18.96)

he, when he heard this, made light of death and danger, and feared much more to live as a coward and not to avenge his friends, and said,

Straightway may I die, after doing vengeance upon the wrongdoer, that I may not stay here, jeered at beside the curved ships, a burden of the earth.

Hanson and Heath estimate that Plato's rejection of the Homeric tradition was not favorably received by the grassroots Greek civilization. The old myths were kept alive in local cults; they continued to influence poetry and to provide the main subjects of painting and sculpture.

More sportingly, the 5th-century BC tragedian Euripides often played with the old traditions, mocking them, and through the voice of his characters injecting notes of doubt. Yet the subjects of his plays were taken, without exception, from myth. Many of these plays were written in answer to a predecessor's version of the same or similar myth. Euripides mainly impugns the myths about the gods and begins his critique with an objection similar to the one previously expressed by Xenocrates: the gods, as traditionally represented, are far too crassly anthropomorphic.

=== Hellenistic and Roman rationalism ===
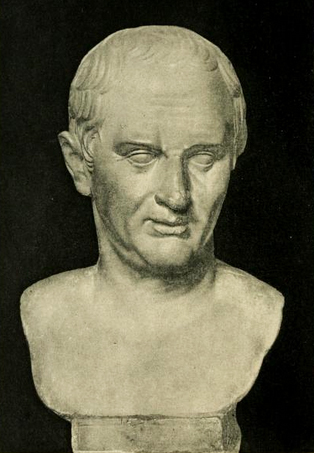
Cicero saw himself as the defender of the established order, despite his personal skepticism concerning myth and his inclination towards more philosophical conceptions of divinity.

During the Hellenistic period, mythology took on the prestige of elite knowledge that marks its possessors as belonging to a certain class. At the same time, the skeptical turn of the Classical age became even more pronounced. Greek mythographer Euhemerus established the tradition of seeking an actual historical basis for mythical beings and events. Although his original work (Sacred Scriptures) is lost, much is known about it from what is recorded by Diodorus and Lactantius.

Rationalizing hermeneutics of myth became even more popular under the Roman Empire, thanks to the physicalist theories of Stoic and Epicurean philosophy. Stoics presented explanations of the gods and heroes as physical phenomena, while the Euhemerists rationalized them as historical figures. At the same time, the Stoics and the Neoplatonists promoted the moral significations of the mythological tradition, often based on Greek etymologies. Through his Epicurean message, Lucretius had sought to expel superstitious fears from the minds of his fellow-citizens. Livy, too, is skeptical about the mythological tradition and claims that he does not intend to pass judgement on such legends (fabulae). The challenge for Romans with a strong and apologetic sense of religious tradition was to defend that tradition while conceding that it was often a breeding-ground for superstition. The antiquarian Varro, who regarded religion as a human institution with great importance for the preservation of good in society, devoted rigorous study to the origins of religious cults. In his Antiquitates Rerum Divinarum (which has not survived, but Augustine's City of God indicates its general approach) Varro argues that whereas the superstitious man fears the gods, the truly religious person venerates them as parents. According to Varro, there have been three accounts of deities in the Roman society: the mythical account created by poets for theatre and entertainment, the civil account used by people for veneration as well as by the city, and the natural account created by the philosophers. The best state is, adds Varro, where the civil theology combines the poetic mythical account with the philosopher's.

Roman Academic Cotta ridicules both literal and allegorical acceptance of myth, declaring roundly that myths have no place in philosophy. Cicero is also generally disdainful of myth, but, like Varro, he is emphatic in his support for the state religion and its institutions. It is difficult to know how far down the social scale this rationalism extended. Cicero asserts that no one (not even old women and boys) is so foolish as to believe in the terrors of Hades or the existence of Scyllas, centaurs or other composite creatures, but, on the other hand, the orator elsewhere complains of the superstitious and credulous character of the people. De Natura Deorum is the most comprehensive summary of Cicero's line of thought.

=== Syncretizing trends ===
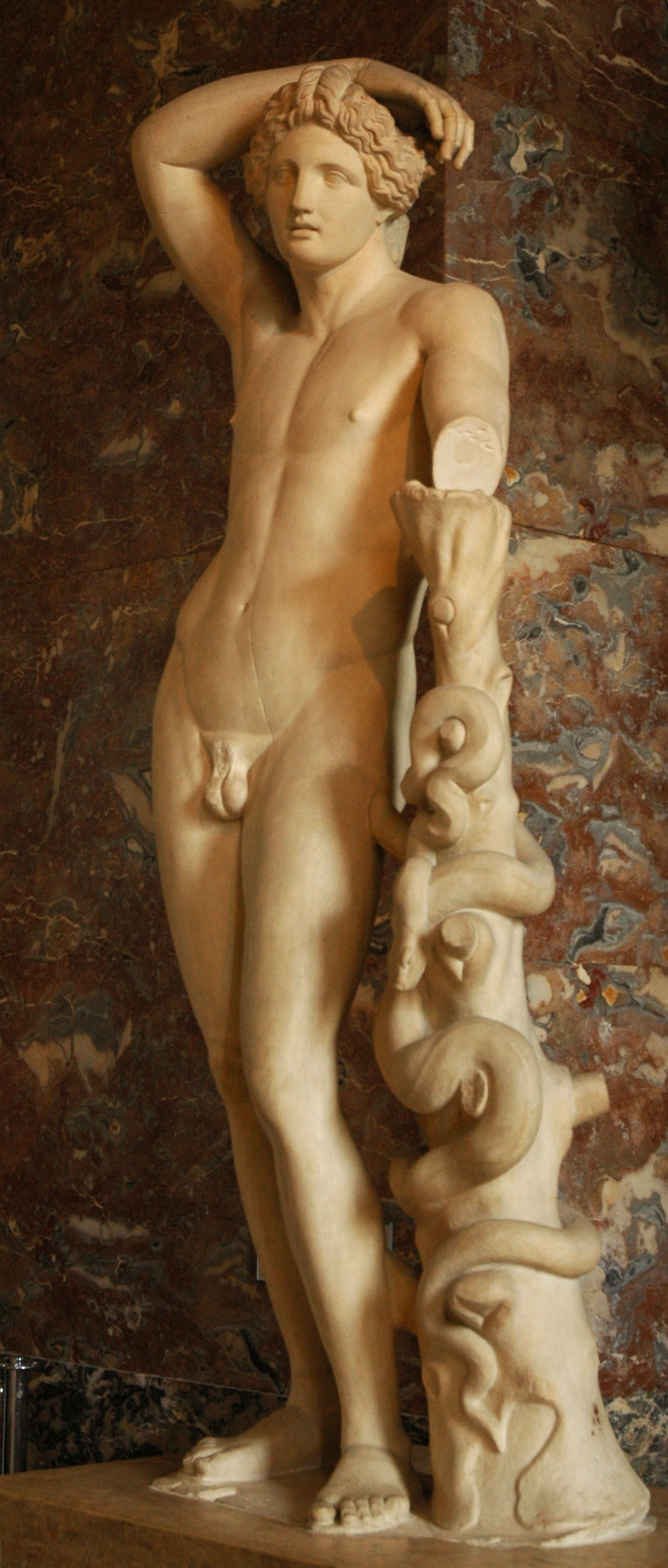
Apollo (early Imperial Roman copy of a fourth-century Greek original, Louvre Museum)

Ancient Greek myths took inspiration from folkloric portrayals of the Olympian gods, as well as Dorian and Ionian deities and their associated folk tales.

In Ancient Roman times, a new Roman mythology was born through syncretization of numerous Greek and other foreign gods. This occurred because the Romans had little mythology of their own, and inheritance of the Greek mythological tradition caused the major Roman gods to adopt characteristics of their Greek equivalents. The gods Zeus and Jupiter are an example of this mythological overlap. In addition to the combination of the two mythological traditions, the association of the Romans with eastern religions led to further syncretizations. For instance, the cult of Sun was introduced in Rome after Aurelian's successful campaigns in Syria. The Asiatic divinities Mithras (that is to say, the Sun) and Ba'al were combined with Apollo and Helios into one Sol Invictus, with conglomerated rites and compound attributes. Apollo might be increasingly identified in religion with Helios or even Dionysus, but texts retelling his myths seldom reflected such developments. The traditional literary mythology was increasingly dissociated from actual religious practice. The worship of Sol as special protector of the emperors and the empire remained the chief imperial religion until it was replaced by Christianity.

The surviving 2nd-century collection of Orphic Hymns (second century AD) and the Saturnalia of Macrobius Ambrosius Theodosius (fifth century) are influenced by the theories of rationalism and the syncretizing trends as well. The Orphic Hymns are a set of pre-classical poetic compositions, attributed to Orpheus, himself the subject of a renowned myth. The stated purpose of the Saturnalia is to transmit the Hellenic culture Macrobius has derived from his reading, even though much of his treatment of gods is colored by Egyptian and North African mythology and theology (which also affect the interpretation of Virgil). In Saturnalia reappear mythographical comments influenced by the Euhemerists, the Stoics and the Neoplatonists.

== Modern interpretations ==
The genesis of modern understanding of Greek mythology is regarded by some scholars as a double reaction at the end of the eighteenth century against "the traditional attitude of Christian animosity", in which the Christian reinterpretation of myth as a "lie" or fable had been retained. In Germany, by about 1795, there was a growing interest in Homer and Greek mythology. In Göttingen, Johann Matthias Gesner began to revive Greek studies, while his successor, Christian Gottlob Heyne, worked with Johann Joachim Winckelmann, and laid the foundations for mythological research both in Germany and elsewhere. About 100 years later the interest for Greek mythology was still alive when Hermann Steuding published his book Griechische und römische Götter- und Heldensage in 1897.

=== Comparative and psychoanalytic approaches ===
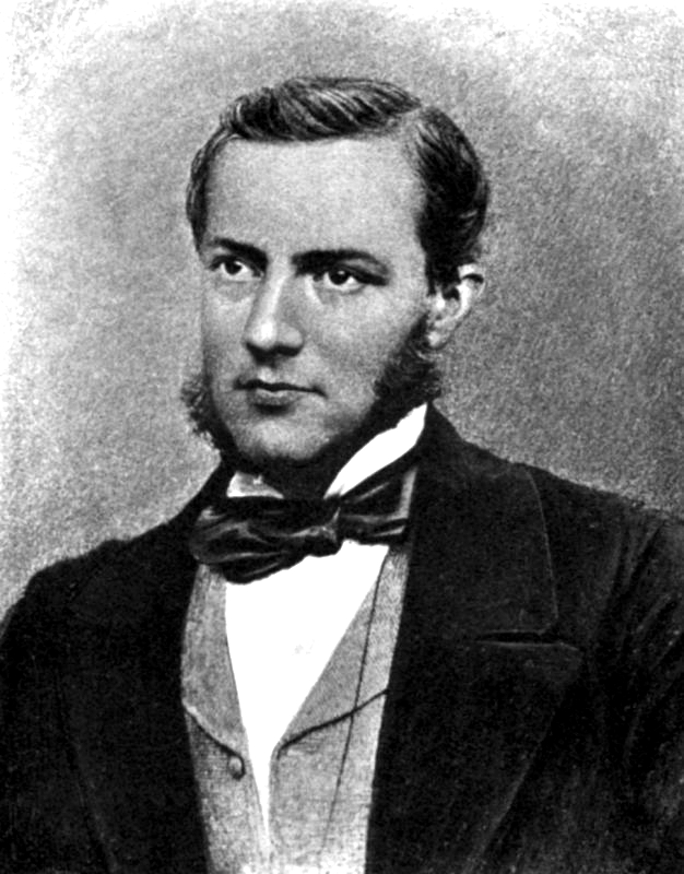
Max Müller is regarded as one of the founders of comparative mythology. In his Comparative Mythology (1867) Müller analysed the "disturbing" similarity between the mythologies of "savage races" with those of the early Europeans.

The development of comparative philology in the 19th century, together with ethnological discoveries in the 20th century, established the science of myth. Since the Romantics, all study of myth has been comparative. Wilhelm Mannhardt, James Frazer, and Stith Thompson employed the comparative approach to collect and classify the themes of folklore and mythology. In 1871 Edward Burnett Tylor published his Primitive Culture, in which he applied the comparative method and tried to explain the origin and evolution of religion. Tylor's procedure of drawing together material culture, ritual and myth of widely separated cultures influenced both Carl Jung and Joseph Campbell. Max Müller applied the new science of comparative mythology to the study of myth, in which he detected the distorted remains of Aryan nature worship. Bronisław Malinowski emphasized the ways myth fulfills common social functions. Claude Lévi-Strauss and other structuralists have compared the formal relations and patterns in myths throughout the world.

Sigmund Freud introduced a transhistorical and biological conception of man and a view of myth as an expression of repressed ideas. Dream interpretation is the basis of Freudian myth interpretation and Freud's concept of dreamwork recognizes the importance of contextual relationships for the interpretation of any individual element in a dream. This suggestion would find an important point of rapprochement between the structuralist and psychoanalytic approaches to myth in Freud's thought. Carl Jung extended the transhistorical, psychological approach with his theory of the "collective unconscious" and the archetypes (inherited "archaic" patterns), often encoded in myth, that arise out of it. According to Jung, "myth-forming structural elements must be present in the unconscious psyche." Comparing Jung's methodology with Joseph Campbell's theory, Robert A. Segal (1990) concludes that "to interpret a myth Campbell simply identifies the archetypes in it. An interpretation of the Odyssey, for example, would show how Odysseus's life conforms to a heroic pattern. Jung, by contrast, considers the identification of archetypes merely the first step in the interpretation of a myth." Karl Kerényi, one of the founders of modern studies in Greek mythology, gave up his early views of myth, in order to apply Jung's theories of archetypes to Greek myth.

=== Origin theories ===
Max Müller attempted to understand an Indo-European religious form by tracing it back to its Indo-European (or, in Müller's time, "Aryan") "original" manifestation. In 1891, he claimed that "the most important discovery which has been made during the nineteenth century concerning the ancient history of mankind ... was this sample equation: Sanskrit Dyaus-pitar = Greek Zeus = Latin Jupiter = Old Norse Tyr". The question of Greek mythology's place in Indo-European studies has generated much scholarship since Müller's time. For example, philologist Georges Dumézil draws a comparison between the Greek Uranus and the Sanskrit Varuna, although there is no hint that he believes them to be originally connected. In other cases, close parallels in character and function suggest a common heritage, yet lack of linguistic evidence makes it difficult to prove, as in the case of the Greek Moirai and the Norns of Norse mythology.

It appears that the Mycenaean religion was the mother of the Greek religion and its pantheon already included many divinities that can be found in classical Greece. However, Greek mythology is generally seen as having heavy influence of Pre-Greek and Near Eastern cultures, and as such contains few important elements for the reconstruction of the Proto-Indo-European religion. Consequently, Greek mythology received minimal scholarly attention in the context of Indo-European comparative mythology until the mid-2000s.

Archaeology and mythography have revealed influence from Asia Minor and the Near East. Adonis seems to be the Greek counterpart—more clearly in cult than in myth—of a Near Eastern "dying god". Cybele is rooted in Anatolian culture while much of Aphrodite's iconography may spring from Semitic goddesses. There are also possible parallels between the earliest divine generations (Chaos and its children) and Tiamat in the Enuma Elish. According to Meyer Reinhold, "near Eastern theogonic concepts, involving divine succession through violence and generational conflicts for power, found their way…into Greek mythology."

In addition to Indo-European and Near Eastern origins, some scholars have speculated on the debts of Greek mythology to the indigenous pre-Greek societies: Crete, Mycenae, Pylos, Thebes and Orchomenus. Historians of religion were fascinated by a number of apparently ancient configurations of myth connected with Crete (the god as bull, Zeus and Europa, Pasiphaë who yields to the bull and gives birth to the Minotaur, etc.). Martin P. Nilsson asserts, based on the representations and general function of the gods, that a lot of Minoan gods and religious conceptions were fused in the Mycenaean religion. and concluded that all great classical Greek myths were tied to Mycenaean centres and anchored in prehistoric times. Nevertheless, according to Burkert, the iconography of the Cretan Palace Period has provided almost no confirmation for these theories.

== Motifs in Western art and literature ==
Botticelli's The Birth of Venus c. 1485–1486, oil on canvas, Uffizi, Florence)—a revived Venus Pudica for a new view of pagan Antiquity—is often said to epitomize for modern viewers the spirit of the Renaissance.

The widespread adoption of Christianity did not curb the popularity of the myths. The Matter of Rome, one of the major literary cycles of Medieval Europe, covered material from ancient Greek myths as well as stories from Greek and Roman history. With the revival of interest in classical literature in the Renaissance, the poetry of Ovid became a major influence on the imagination of poets, dramatists, musicians and artists. From the early years of Renaissance, artists such as Leonardo da Vinci, Michelangelo, and Raphael, portrayed the pagan subjects of Greek mythology alongside more conventional Christian themes. Through the medium of Latin and the works of Ovid, Greek myth influenced medieval and Renaissance poets such as Petrarch, Boccaccio and Dante in Italy.

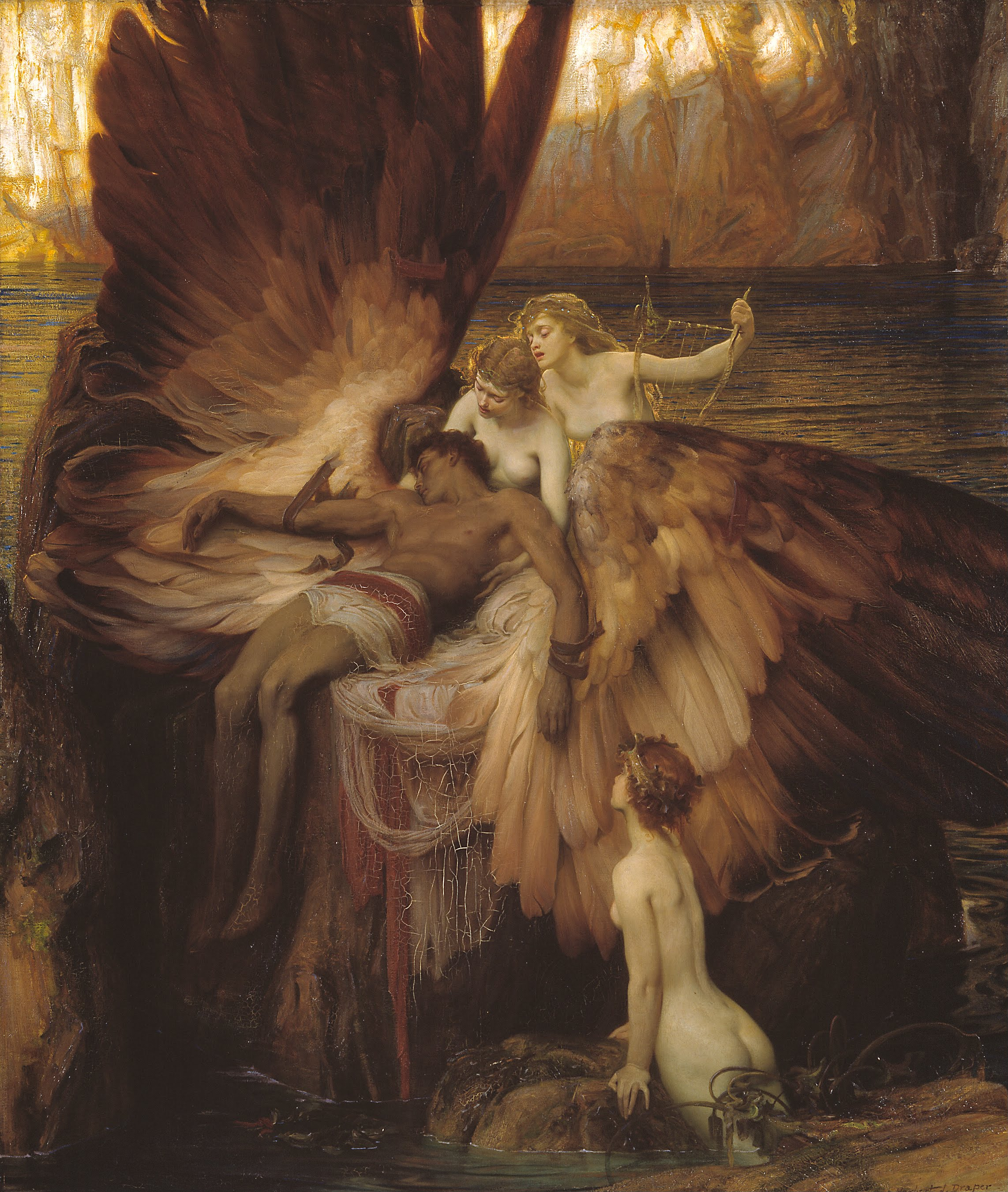
The Lament for Icarus (1898) by Herbert James Draper

In Northern Europe, Greek mythology never took the same hold of the visual arts, but its effect was very obvious on literature. The English imagination was fired by Greek mythology starting with Chaucer and John Milton and continuing through Shakespeare to Robert Bridges in the 20th century. Racine in France and Goethe in Germany revived Greek drama, reworking the ancient myths. Although during the Enlightenment of the 18th century reaction against Greek myth spread throughout Europe, the myths continued to provide an important source of raw material for dramatists, including those who wrote the libretti for many of Handel's and Mozart's operas.

By the end of the 18th century, Romanticism initiated a surge of enthusiasm for all things Greek, including Greek mythology. In Britain, new translations of Greek tragedies and Homer inspired contemporary poets (such as Alfred Tennyson, Keats, Byron and Shelley) and painters (such as Lord Leighton and Lawrence Alma-Tadema). Christoph Gluck, Richard Strauss, Jacques Offenbach and many others set Greek mythological themes to music. American authors of the 19th century, such as Thomas Bulfinch and Nathaniel Hawthorne, held that the study of the classical myths was essential to the understanding of English and American literature. In more recent times, classical themes have been reinterpreted by dramatists Jean Anouilh, Jean Cocteau, and Jean Giraudoux in France, Eugene O'Neill in America, and T. S. Eliot in Britain and by novelists such as James Joyce and André Gide.
