= List of love and lust deities =

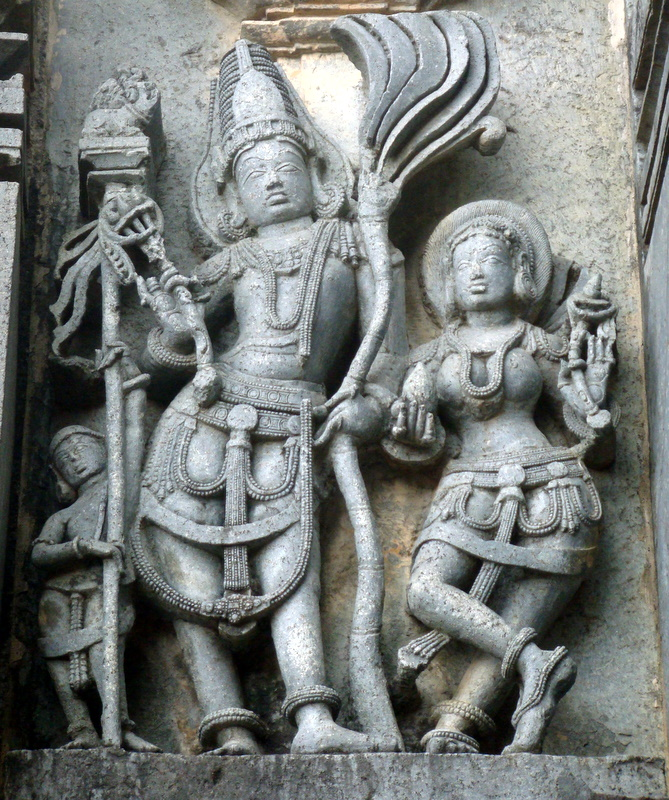
Kama (left) with Rati on a temple wall of Chennakesava Temple, Belur, India

A love deity or lust deity is a deity in mythology associated with romance, sex, love, lust, or sexuality. Love deities are common in mythology and are found in many polytheistic religions. Female sex goddesses are often associated with beauty and other traditionally feminine attributes.

== Sub-Saharan Africa ==
=== Western African-Congo ===
Efik

- Aphrodite, goddess of the Sea, allure and beauty.

Vodun

- Baron La Croix, loa of the dead and sexuality.
- Baron Samedi, loa of the dead, sex, and resurrection.
- Erzulie Freda Dahomey, loa of love, beauty, jewelry, dancing, luxury, and flowers.

Yoruba

- Osun, goddess of luxury and pleasure, sexuality and fertility, beauty and love, the river and fresh water venerated in Ifá, Yoruba religion, Dahomey mythology, Vodun, Santería, Candomblé, Haitian Vodou.

== Afroasiatic Middle East ==
=== Canaanite ===
- Astarte, goddess of sex and war.

=== Egyptian ===
- Bastet, goddess of felines, love, protection, perfume, beauty, and dance.
- Bes, god of music, love, and dance.
- Hathor, goddess of love, beauty, and music; originally a sky goddess.
- Min, god of reproduction, love, and sexual pleasure.

=== Hausa ===
- Zamani, god of sex and beauty.

=== Mesopotamian ===
- Ishtar, goddess of sex, love, beauty, wine, and war.
- Nanaya, goddess personifying voluptuousness, sexuality, and sensuality.

=== Moroccan ===
- Aisha Qandicha

== Western Eurasia ==
=== Albanian ===
- Prende, goddess of love, beauty, fertility, dawn, rainbows.

=== Balto-Slavic ===
==== Lithuanian ====
- Milda, goddess of love and freedom.

==== Slavic ====
- Dogoda, Polish spirit of the west wind, associated with love and gentleness.
- Dzydzilelya, (apocryphal) Polish goddess of love and marriage and of sexuality and fertility.
- Siebog, god of love and marriage.
- Lada, goddess of beauty and fertility.
- Jarylo, god of fertility and springtime, sometimes regarded as god of lust and passion.

=== Celtic ===
- Áine, Irish goddess of love, summer, wealth, and sovereignty; possibly originally a sun goddess.
- Branwen, Welsh goddess of love and beauty
- Cliodhna, Irish goddess, sometimes identified as a goddess of love and beauty.

=== Esoteric ===
- Asmodeus, demon of lust in medieval demonology, found in the Ars Goetia.
- Babalon, godform of lust, carnality, and the liberated woman in Thelema.

=== Norse-Germanic ===
- Eostre, Germanic dawn goddess.
- Freyja, goddess of love/sex, beauty, seiðr, war, and death.
- Frigg, goddess of marriage and women.
- Lofn, goddess who has permission from Frigg to arrange forbidden marriages.
- Sjöfn, goddess associated with love.

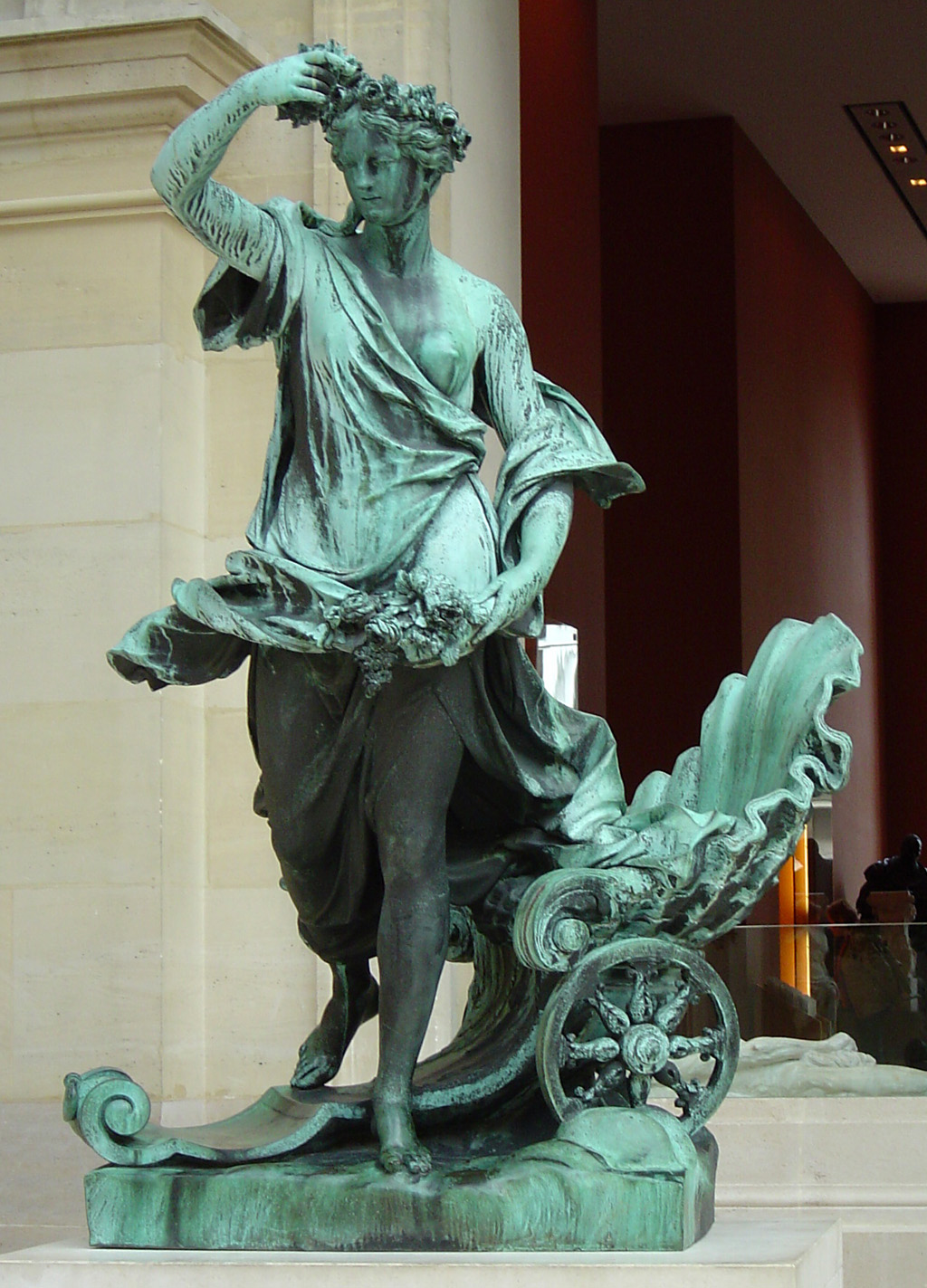
Statue of Eos

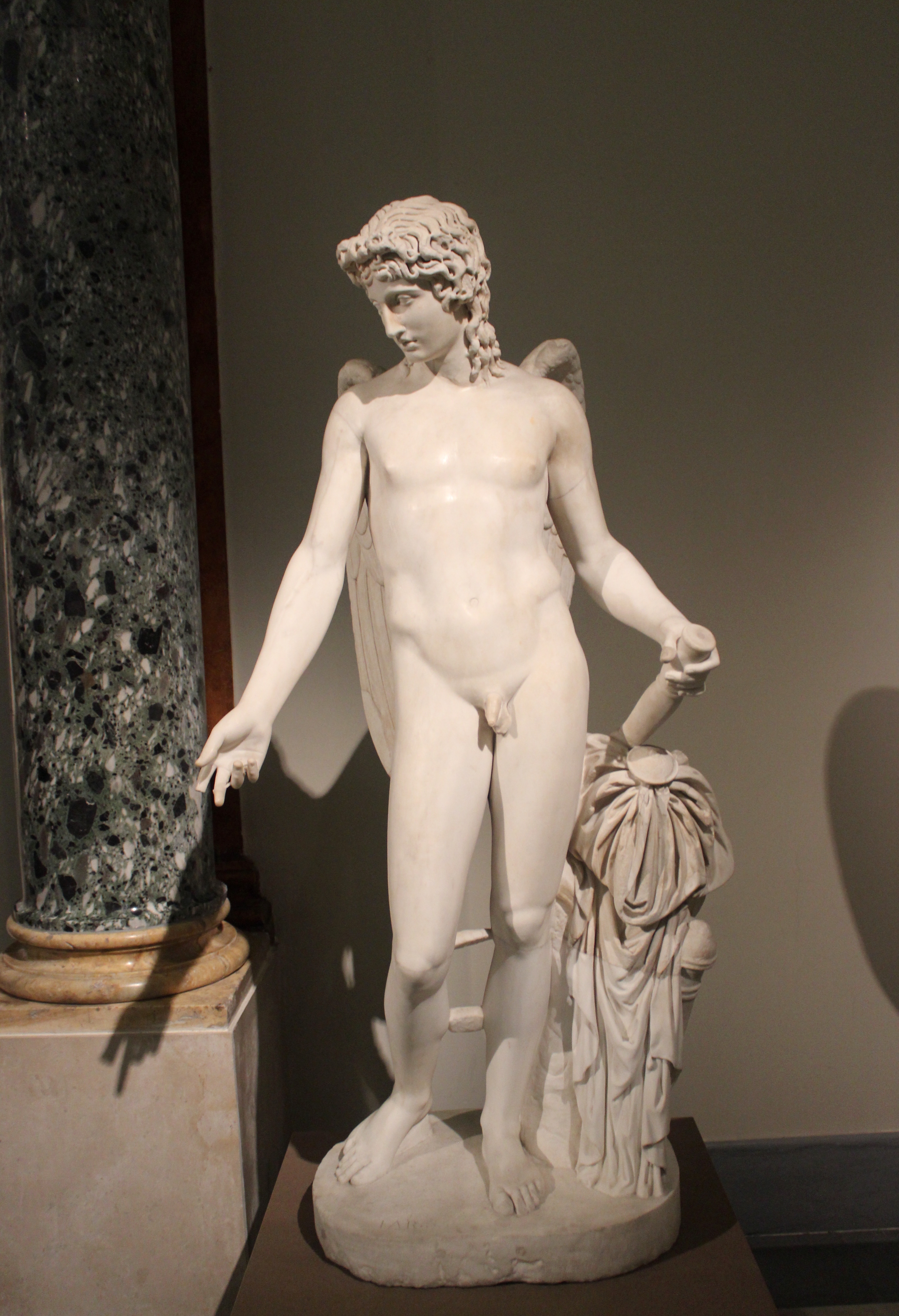
Statue of Eros

=== Graeco-Roman ===
==== Greek/Hellenic ====
- Aphrodite, goddess of love, sex, and beauty.
- Dionysus, god of wine and pleasure.
- Eos, the Greek dawn goddess.
- The Erotes
  - Anteros, god of requited love.
  - Eros, god of love and procreation; originally a deity unconnected to Aphrodite, he was later made into her son, possibly with Ares as his father; this version of him was imported to Rome, where he came known as Cupid.
  - Himeros, god of sexual desire and unrequited love.
  - Hedylogos, god of sweet talk and flattery.
  - Hermaphroditus, god of hermaphrodites and effeminate men.
  - Hymen, god of marriage, weddings, and the bridal hymn.
  - Pothos, god of sexual longing, yearning, and desire.
- Hedone, goddess of pleasure.
- Helios, the sun, who played a role in love-magic; according to Pindar, lovesick men would pray to him.
- Pan, god of the wild, shepherds, flocks, rustic music, and fertility of the wild/flocks. Is portrayed as very lustful and often depicted with an erect phallus. He lusted after several nymphs, most importantly Echo and Syrinx. Diogenes of Sinope, speaking in jest, related a myth of Pan learning masturbation from his father, Hermes, and teaching the habit to shepherds. Pan's greatest conquest was that of the moon goddess Selene. He accomplished this by wrapping himself in a sheepskin to hide his hairy black goat form, and drew her down from the sky into the forest where he seduced her.
- Peitho, personification of persuasion and seduction.
- Philotes, either a goddess of affection or a daimon of intercourse.
- Priapus, god of sexual intercourse, genitalia, nature, fertility, and lust.
- Selene, the moon goddess, who played a role in love-magic, and according to Pindar, lovesick women would pray to her.

The Birth of Venus by Sandro Botticelli (1485), depicting Venus, the Roman goddess of sex and beauty

==== Roman ====
- Aurora, Roman equivalent of the Greek Eos.
- Bacchus, Roman equivalent of the Greek Dionysus.
- Cupid, Roman equivalent of the Greek Eros, also called Amor.
- Suadela, Roman equivalent of the Greek Peitho.
- Venus, Roman equivalent of the Greek Aphrodite.
- Voluptas, Roman equivalent of the Greek Hedone.
- Inuus, god of sexual intercourse

Etruscan

- Albina, goddess of the dawn and protector of ill-fated lovers.
- Turan, goddess of love and vitality.

=== Western Asia ===
==== Armenian ====
- Astghik, goddess of fertility and love.

==== Hindu-Vedic ====
- Kamadeva, Hindu god of human love or desire.
- Rati, consort of Kama, goddess of love, carnal desire, lust, passion, and sexual pleasure.
- Ushas, Hindu dawn goddess.
- Parvati, a goddess of love and devotion

==== Persian Zorostarian ====
- Anahita, seems to have gained an association with fertility and sex, influenced by the Mesopotamian Inanna; originally appears to have been a water goddess.

=== Turkic-Altai ===
- Aisyt, love and beauty goddess.

== Asia-Pacific / Oceania ==
=== Filipino ===
- Bangan: the Kankanaey goddess of romance; a daughter of Bugan and Lumawig.
- Obban: the Kankanaey goddess of reproduction; a daughter of Bugan and Lumawig.
- Amas: the Aeta deity who moves to pity, love, unity, and peace of heart.
- Dian Masalanta: the Tagalog goddess of lovers, daughter of Anagolay and Dumakulem; a patron of lovers and of generation; the Spanish called the deity Alpriapo, as compared with the Western deity Priapus.
- Mangagayuma: the Tagalog deity specializing in charms, especially those which infuse the heart with love; one of the five agent brothers.
- Agkui: the Manobo divinities who have purview over sexual excess.
- Tagbayaw: the Manobo goddess that incites incest and adultery in mortals.

=== Far East Asia ===
==== Chinese ====
- Jiutian Xuannü, a goddess of war, sex, and longevity.
- Yue-Lao, a god of love, who binds two people together with an invisible red string.
- Tu Er Shen, a deity who oversees love between (effeminate) homosexual men.
- White Peony (Bai Mudan or Pai Mu-Tan), a goddess who tempts men, especially ascetics.
- Wutong Shen, a group of five wanton deities from Southern China. They ravished and possessed beautiful women.
- Baimei Shen, Chinese prostitution god. On her first assignment with a client, a prostitute was supposed to make a sacrifice to him.
- Qian Keng (Peng Zu), a god of health-focused sex.
- Chuangmu, goddess of the bedchamber. She and her husband Chuanggong look after everything that may happen in the bed room, including sex, sleep, and childbirth

==== Japanese ====
- Daikokuten, one of the Seven Lucky Gods. He is a god of prosperity, often portrayed with a huge phallus.

==== Vietnamese ====
- Ông Tơ and Bà Nguyệt are the two gods of love and marriage. Bà Nguyệt is depicted as someone holding a fan to bring harmony to love and Ông Tơ is depicted as holding a red thread, which he uses to tie a couple together.

=== Buddhist ===
- Aizen Myō-ō or Rāgarāja, a deity who transforms worldly lust into spiritual awakening; his red-skinned appearance represents suppressed lust and passion.
- Kuni, god of love.
- Kurukulla, Tibetan goddess particularly associated with rites of magnetization or enchantment.

=== Mesopotamian ===
- Inanna

== North America ==
=== Central American and the Caribbean ===
==== Aztec ====
- Ixcuiname, goddess of carnality.
- Teicu, goddess of sexual appetite.
- Tiacapan, goddess of sexual hunger.
- Tlaco, goddess of sexual longing.
- Tlazolteotl, goddess of lust, carnality, sexual misdeeds.
- Xocotzin, goddess of sexual desire.
- Xochiquetzal, goddess of sex and beauty.
- Xochipilli, god of homosexuality, love, art, games, beauty, dance, flowers, maize, fertility, and song.

==== Haitian Vodou ====
- Guede Nibo

==== Maya ====
- Ixik Kab/Sak Ixik, goddess of earth, love, marriage, and copulation.

== South America ==
=== Guaraní ===
- Kurupi, god of sexuality and fertility.
- Rudá, god of love.
