= Himeros =

Greek god of desire

- God of desire and lust
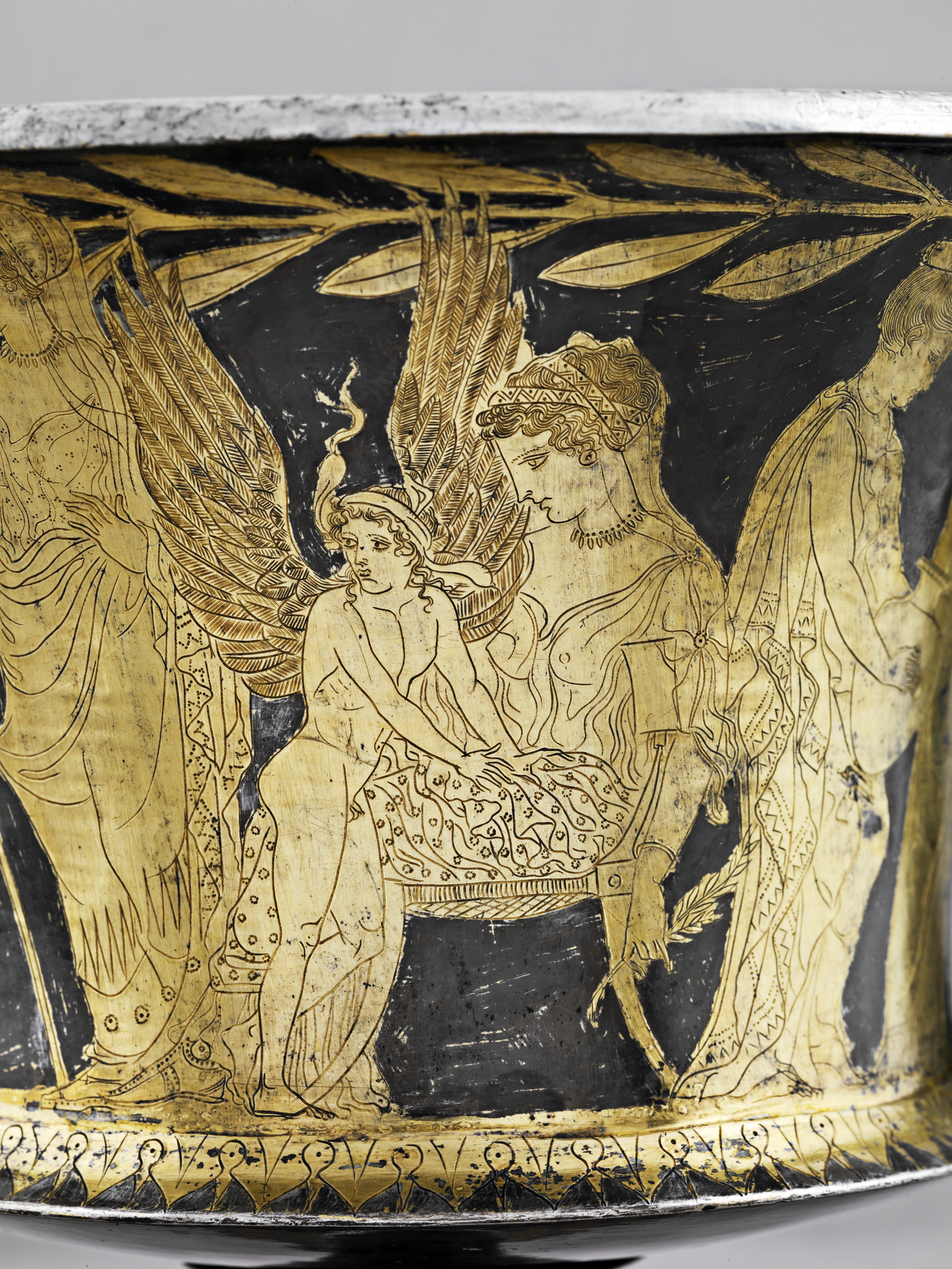
- Aphrodite with Himeros, detail from a silver kantharos, c. 420-410 BC
- Abode: Mount Olympus
- Symbol: Bow and arrows

In Greek mythology and ancient Greek religion, Himeros (Ancient Greek: Ἱμερος, romanized: Hímeros, lit. 'desire') is a winged love deity who is part of Aphrodite's procession. Often described as "sweet", he is the god and personification of desire and lust.

== Myth and theology ==
In Hesiod's Theogony, Eros and Himeros were present at Aphrodite's birth and escorted the goddess as she emerged out of the sea foam and joined the assembly of the gods. Earlier in the Theogony, Himeros is mentioned as a resident of Mount Olympus, being a neighbor of the Muses and the Charites. Himeros (desire) and Philotes (affection) were bestowed upon the world by Aphrodite initiating sexual encounter; they spoke words of love and winning talk that affected the minds (nous) and hearts of mortals and gods alike.

Himeros is closely associated with Pothos, the personification of passionate longing. In his dialogue Cratylus, Plato points out the difference between the two concepts explaining that, in the case of Himeros, the object of desire is present and thus the desire is ready to be satisfied; whereas, in the case of Pothos, the individual longs for something that is absent or out of reach. Subsequently, Pothos is unfulfilled and potentially a suffering. Though Himeros is the standard term for erotic desire, it can also appear in different contexts carrying an alternative meaning, like desire for grief (after a tragic event) or for food; e.g. the "himeros for sweet food" that a laborer feels after a long day at work. Though these figures inspired artistic and poetic creations, they had no mythological stories or cults of their own.

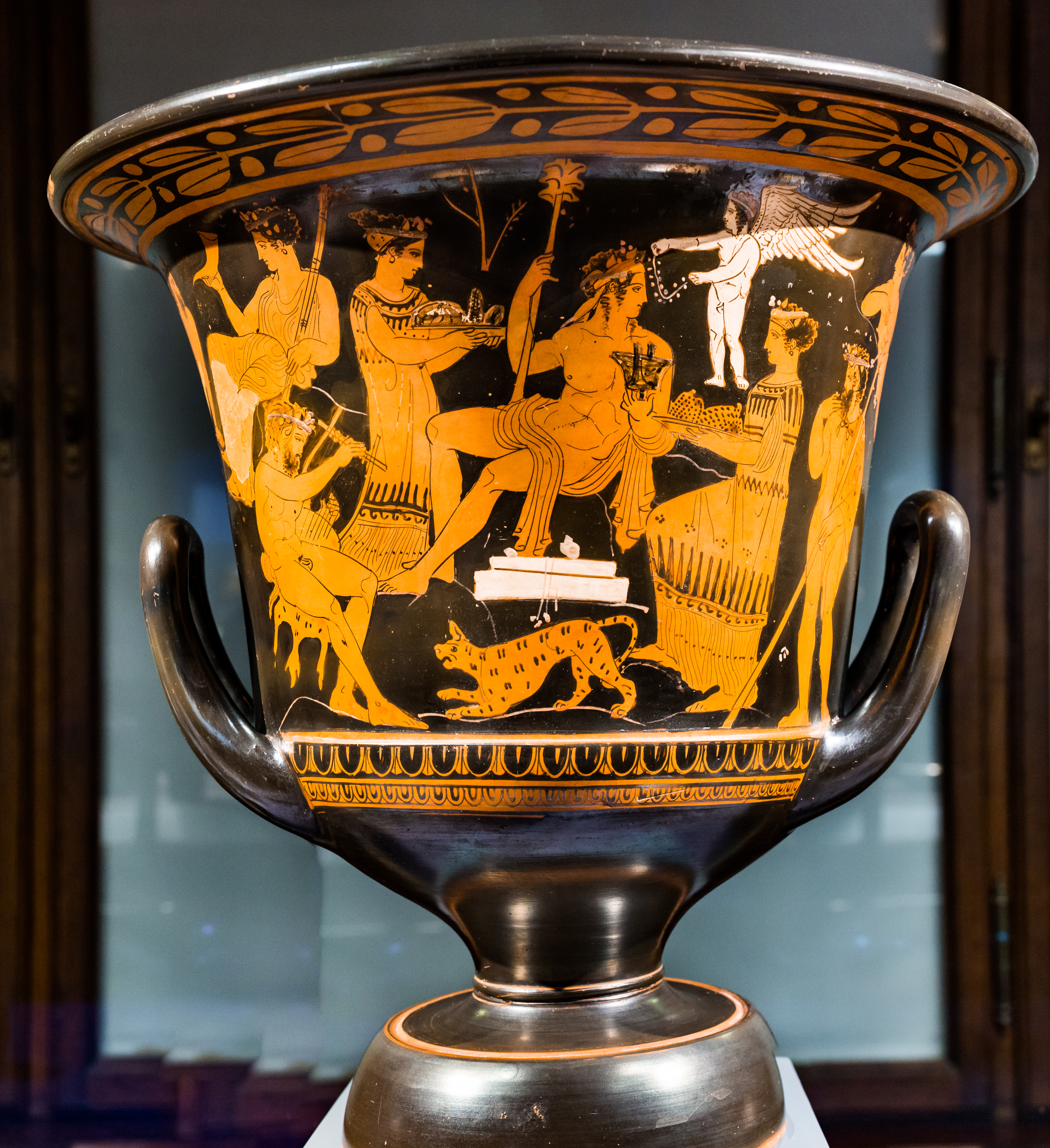
Seated Dionysus crowned by Himeros and surrounded by Satyrs and Maenads. Attic red figure calyx-krater, c. 425–400 BC.

== See also ==
- Erotes
- Eros (concept)
- Greek words for love

== Sources ==
- Calame, Claude (2013). The Poetics of Eros in Ancient Greece. Princeton University Press. ISBN 9780691159430.
- Pownall, Frances; Müller, Sabine; Asirvatham, Sulochana (2022). The Courts of Philip II and Alexander the Great, Monarchy and Power in Ancient Macedonia. De Gruyter. ISBN 9783110623642.
- Liebert, Rana Saadi (2017). Tragic Pleasure from Homer to Plato. Cambridge University Press. ISBN 9781316885611.
- Vernant, Jean-Pierre; Zeitlin, Froma (1991). Mortals and Immortals, Collected Essays. Princeton University Press. ISBN 9780691019314.
- Breitenberger, Barbara (2013). Aphrodite and Eros, The Development of Greek Erotic Mythology. Taylor & Francis. ISBN 9781135883775.
