= Hedylogos =

Figure depicted on ancient Greek vases

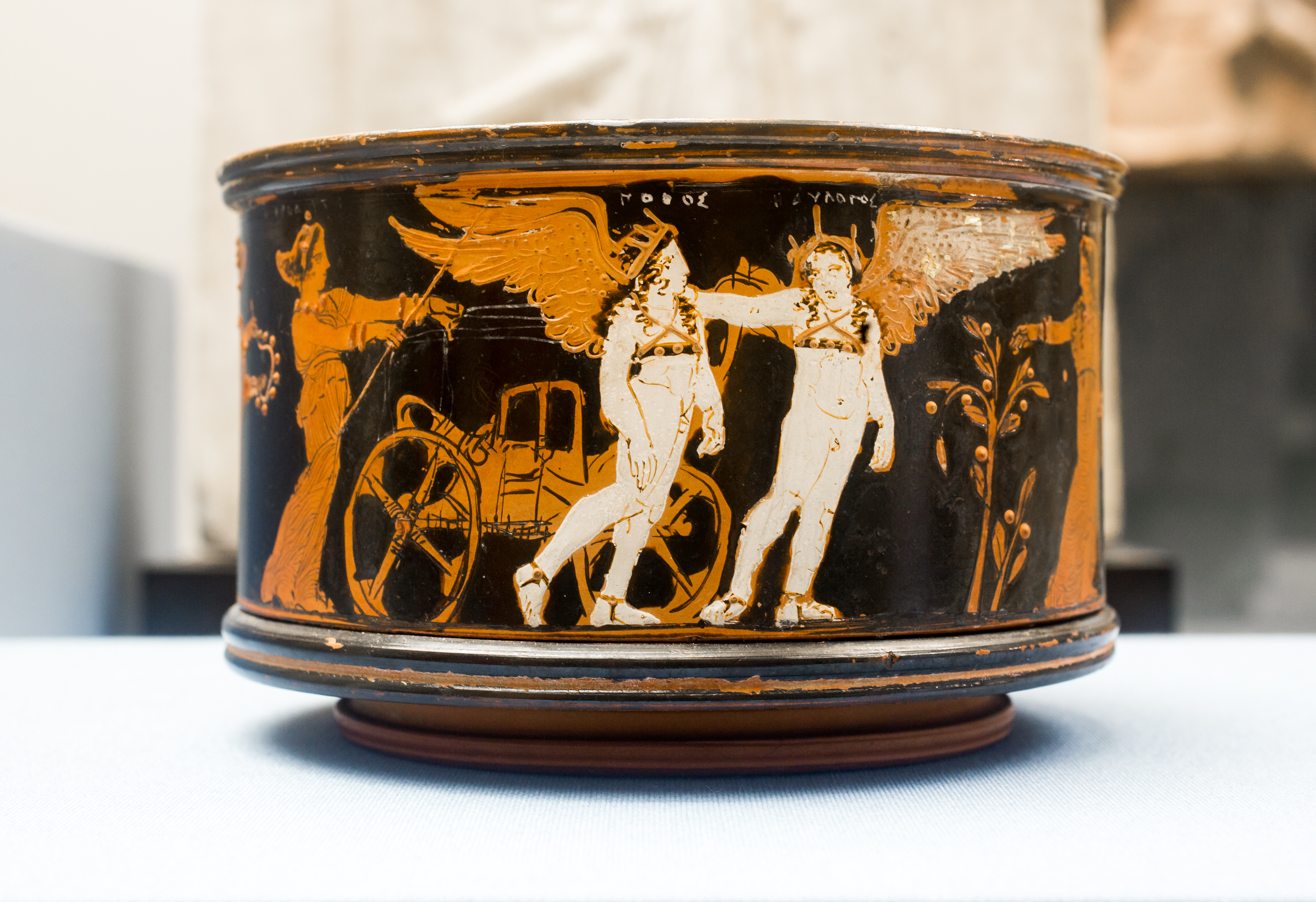
Hedylogos and Pothos are yoked to a chariot, behind which stands Aphrodite. Attic red figure cylindrical pyxis, c. 420–400 BC, attributed to the Meidias Painter. (Note: British Museum 1893,1103.2.)

Hedylogos (Ancient Greek: Ἡδυλόγος, lit. 'sweet-voiced, flattering') is one of the Erotes and a figure who commonly appears in ancient Greek vase paintings. A surviving example on a red-figure pyxis from the late 5th century BC shows Hedylogos, alongside his brother Pothos, drawing the chariot of Aphrodite. An oenochoe, originating from close to Thebes and dating to around 370 BC, also depicts him alongside Aphrodite.
