= Voluptas =

Roman deity, personification of pleasure

- Goddess of enjoyment, sensual pleasure, bliss and delight
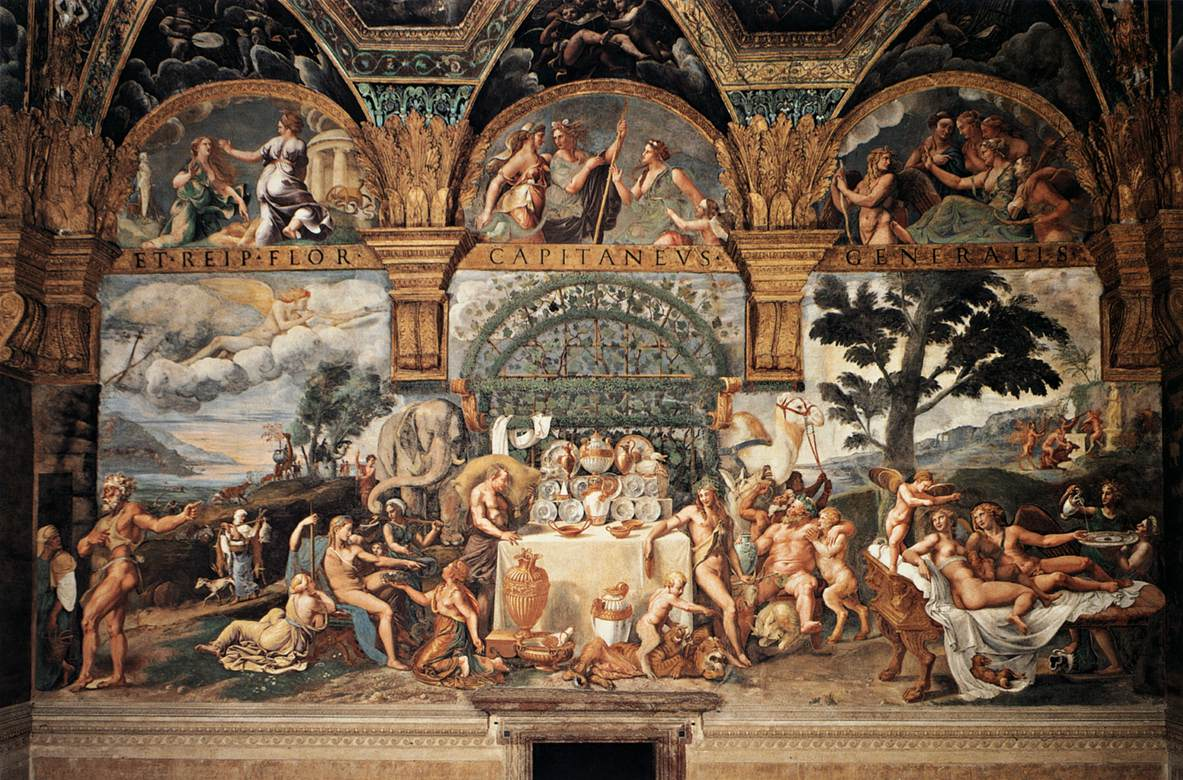
- Giulio Romano's Banquet of Amor and Psyche, which depicts Voluptas and her parents (at far right).
- Other names: Volupta
- Parents: Cupid and Anima

Equivalents
- Greek: Hedone

In Roman mythology, Voluptas or Volupta is the daughter born from the union of Cupid and Psyche, according to Apuleius. The Latin word voluptas means 'pleasure' or 'delight'; Voluptas is known as the goddess of "sensual pleasures". She is often found in the company of the Gratiae, or Three Graces.

Some Roman authors mention a goddess named Volupia, a name which appears to signify "willingness". She had a temple, the Sacellum Volupiae, on the Via Nova, by the Porta Romana. Sacrifices were offered to the Diva Angerona there.

The corresponding goddess in Greek mythology is Hedone.

== See also ==
- Hercules at the crossroads
