= Pothos (mythology) =

Greek mythological personification

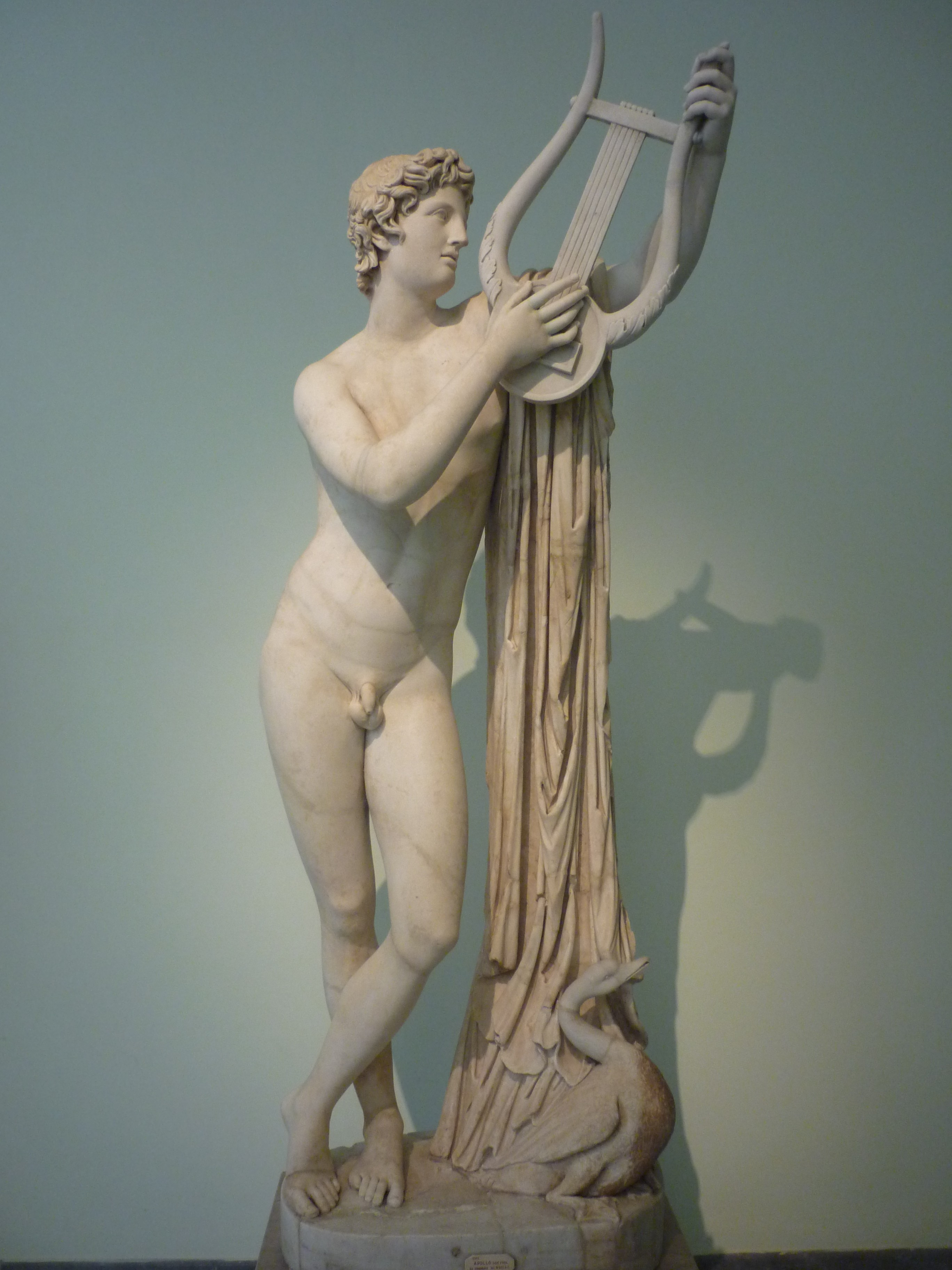
2nd-century Roman statue of Pothos in the Archaeological Museum of Naples, Italy

In Greek mythology, Pothos (Ancient Greek: Πόθος, romanized: Póthos, lit. 'yearning, desire') is the personification of erotic desire. He is one of deities who accompany Aphrodite, alongside Eros and Himeros.

== Greek literature ==
According to Jan Bažant, the use of "desire" in a fragment of Archilochus (7th century BC) may refer to the personification of the word. Pothos first appears clearly personified in Aeschylus (6th to 5th centuries BC), where he and Peitho are described as children and attendants of Aphrodite. In Sophocles (5th century BC), he appears to be the personification of the yearning for someone who is not present. Euripides's Bacchae (5th century BC) associates him with Dionysus, as a god pertaining to ecstasy and pleasure. In his Symposium, Plato (5th to 4th centuries BC) describes him as the child of Eros. In the Dionysiaca of Nonnus (6th century AD), Pothos is described as the son of Zephyrus and Iris.

Pothos does not appear in any mythological stories.

== Iconography ==
There are no meaningful iconographic differences between Pothos and figures such as Eros and Himeros who similarly accompany Aphrodite. In depictions of Pothos on vases, he has wings and long hair. The earliest extant representations of him date to the 5th century BC, and he usually appears in wedding scenes. On an Eretrian pyxis dating to around 400 BC, he and Hedylogos, their names inscribed, are shown drawing the carriage of Aphrodite. According to Bažant, this scene possibly references a fragment of Sappho in which "beautiful sparrows" do the drawing. Between 340 and 330 BC, the sculptor Scopas created two statues representing Pothos, both of which are now lost. One of the statues treated him as on par with Aphrodite; its likeness is known through copies, as well as gems that contain its picture. These extant works suggest that it showed Pothos as effeminate and as standing alongside a phallic sceptre, with Aphrodite and a goose (an animal sacred to her) next to him. The other statue is said by the 2nd-century AD travel writer Pausanias to have stood in the temple of Aphrodite at Megara. Pothos also figures in Dionysiac scenes during the late 5th century BC.

== Other references ==
According to Henning Börm, an "association of death" is indicated by the use of the Pothos flower to adorn graves in ancient times. In his Phoenician History, the 1st-to-2nd-century AD grammarian Philo of Byblos mentions a genealogy which places Pothos and Eros as the offspring of the Greek god Cronus and the Near Eastern goddess Astarte.
