= Hedone =

Greek goddess of sensuality and pleasure

Hedone (Ancient Greek: ἡδονή, romanized: hēdonē) is the Greek word meaning "pleasure". It was an important concept in Ancient Greek philosophy, especially in the Epicurean school. It is also the root of the English word "hedonism".

In Greek mythology, Hedone is personified as a goddess of pleasure, enjoyment, and delight, as the daughter born from the union of Eros (personification of love) and Psyche (personification of the soul). She was associated more specifically with sensual pleasure. Her equivalent in Roman mythology is Voluptas. There is no evidence that she was ever the object of cult worship.

== Aristotle's Hēdonē ==
Aristotle identified it as one of the two elements or components of pathe, with the other being lype or pain. Aristotle described pathe in these words: "Let the emotions be all those things on account of which people change their minds and differ in regard to their judgments, and upon which attend pain and pleasure."

Hēdonē, is part of Aristotle's account of virtue, such that 'pleasure' (along with pain) is said to reveal a person's character. It is good if it is a consequence of a virtuous life – as opposed to the position Aristippus, who holds that hēdonē is "wholly good". An example is the concept of proper pleasure or oikeia hedone, which Aristotle discusses in /Poetics/ and considers a process of restoration. Martin Heidegger interprets Aristotelian hēdonē: that pleasure is a movement of the soul and that tranquility arises from it.

== In Epicureanism ==
In the philosophy of Epicurus, hēdonē is described as a pleasure that may or may not derive from actions that are virtuous, whereas another form of pleasure, terpsis, is always virtuous. Another Epicurean reading, which distinguished hēdonē from terpsis, referred to it as a feeling of pleasure that is episodic and might or might not be beneficial. According to the Stanford Encyclopedia of Philosophy, Epicurus uses hēdonē in reference to only physical pleasures.

== Stoicism ==
The Stoics held a negative view of hēdonē, arguing that it is not in accordance with nature and reason. This can be understood within the philosophy's position that emotions are by definition excessive or are excessive impulses that exceed the measure of natural reason and – as in other forms of excess – leads to other evils of irrationality.

== See also ==
- Hedonism
