= Erotes =

Greek love deities

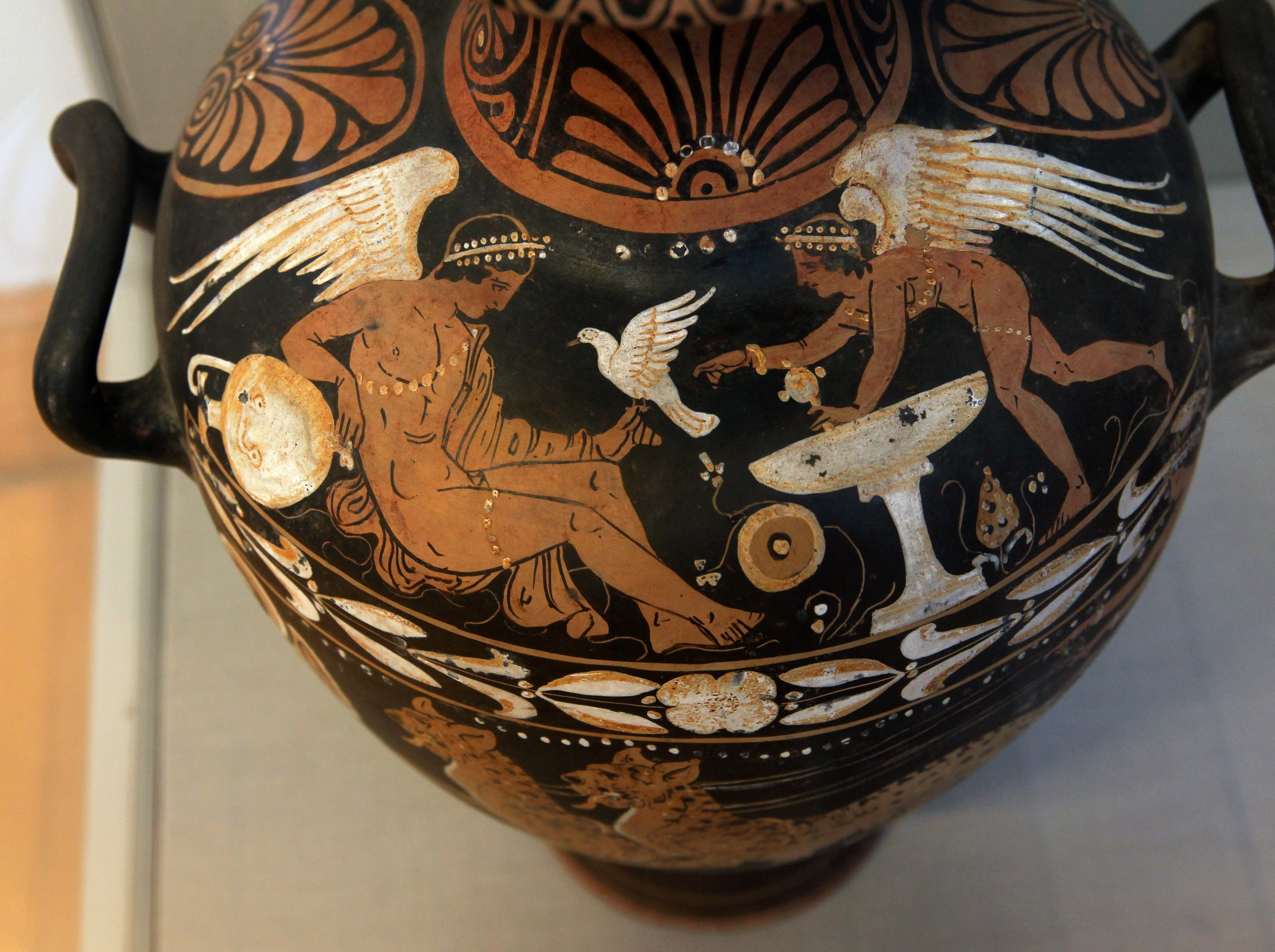
Two Erotes, depicted on a Campanian hydria by the Danaid Painter, c. 340–320 BC

In ancient Greek religion and mythology, the Erotes (/əˈroʊtiːz/; Ancient Greek: ἔρωτες, érōtes) are a collective of winged gods associated with love and sexual intercourse. They are part of Aphrodite's retinue, along with the Charites. Erotes is the plural of Eros ("Love, Desire"), who as a singular deity has a more complex mythology.

The Erotes became a motif of Hellenistic art, and may appear in Roman art in the alternate form of multiple Cupids. In the later tradition of Western art, Erotes become indistinguishable from figures also known as Cupids, amorini, or amoretti.

== General role and attributes ==
The Erotes are a group of winged gods in Classical mythology. They are associated with love and sexual desire, and form part of Aphrodite's retinue. Sometimes the Erotes are regarded as manifestations of a singular god, Eros.

The Erotes' pranks were a popular theme in Hellenistic art, particularly in the 2nd century CE. Spells to attract or repel Erotes were used, in order to induce love or the opposite.

The Erotes were usually portrayed as nude, handsome, winged youths. The earliest known sculptured friezes depicting a group of Erotes and winged maidens driving chariots pulled by goats, were created to decorate theatres in ancient Greece in the 2nd century BCE. The representation of Erotes in such friezes became common, including Erotes in hunting scenes. Due to their role in the classical mythological pantheon, the Erotes' representation is sometimes purely symbolic (indicating some form of love) or they may be portrayed as individual characters. The presence of Erotes in otherwise non-sexual images, such as of two women, has been interpreted to indicate a homoerotic subtext. In the cult of Aphrodite in Anatolia, iconographic images of the goddess with three Erotes symbolized the three realms over which she had dominion: the Earth, sky, and water.

== Gallery ==
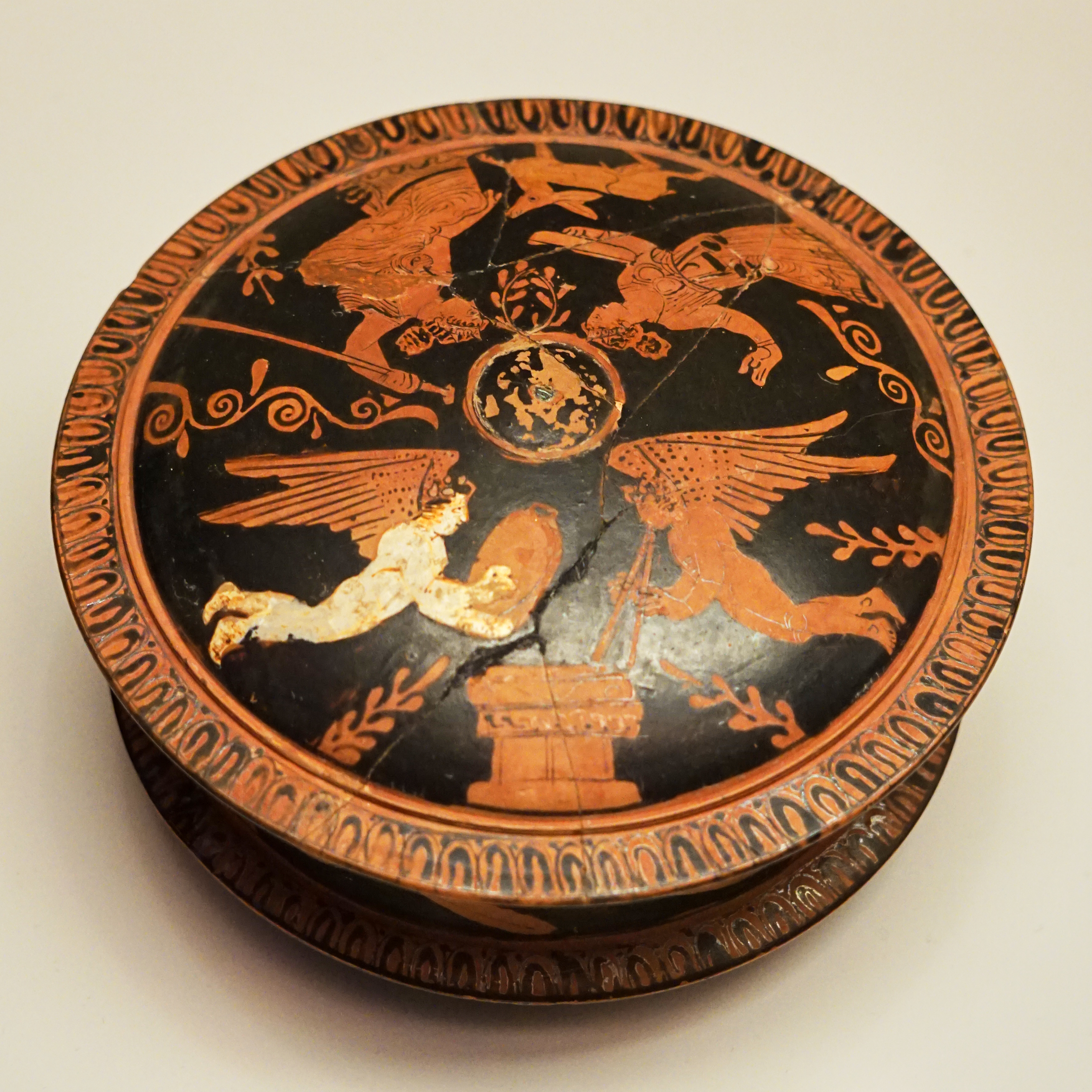

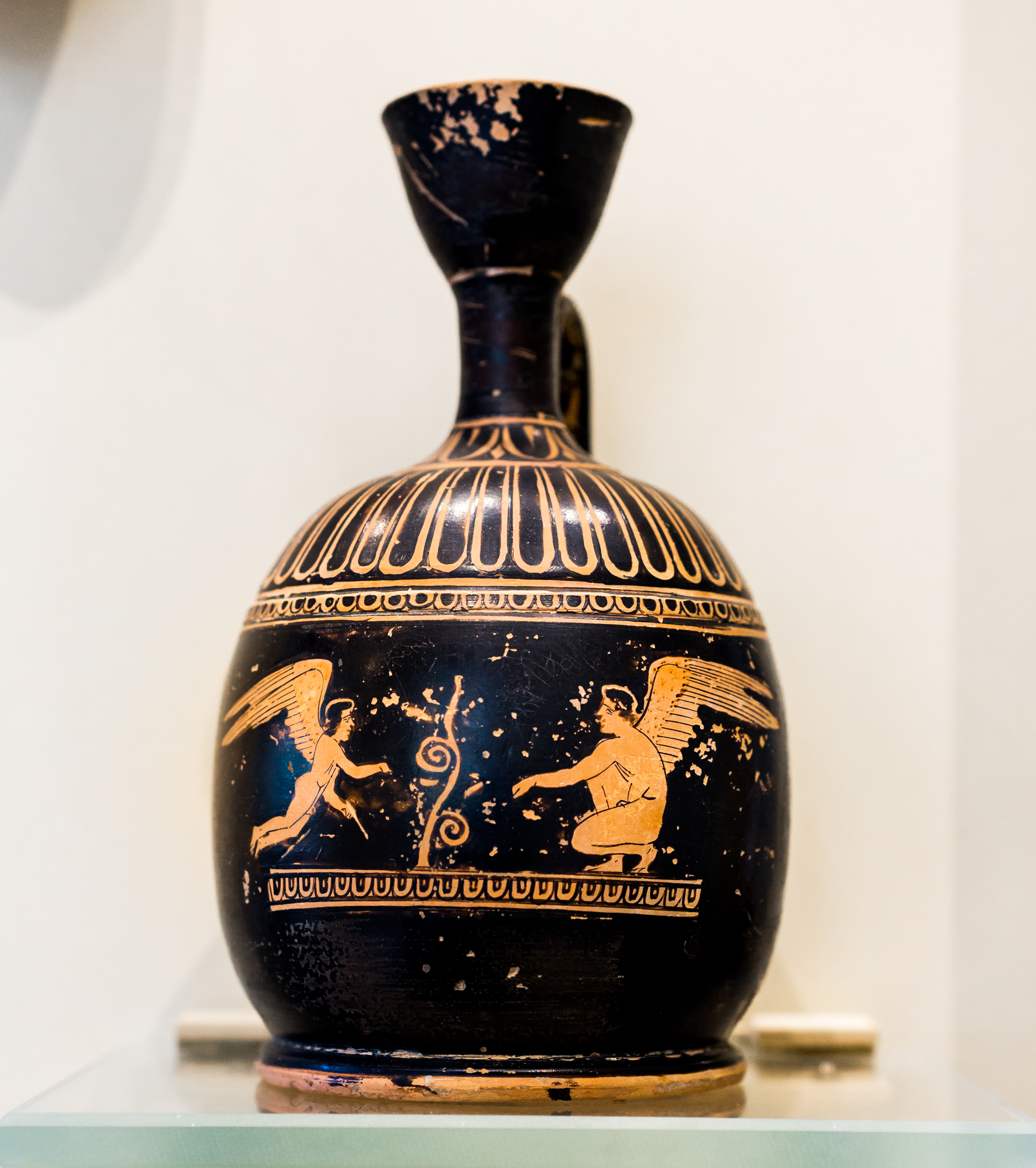

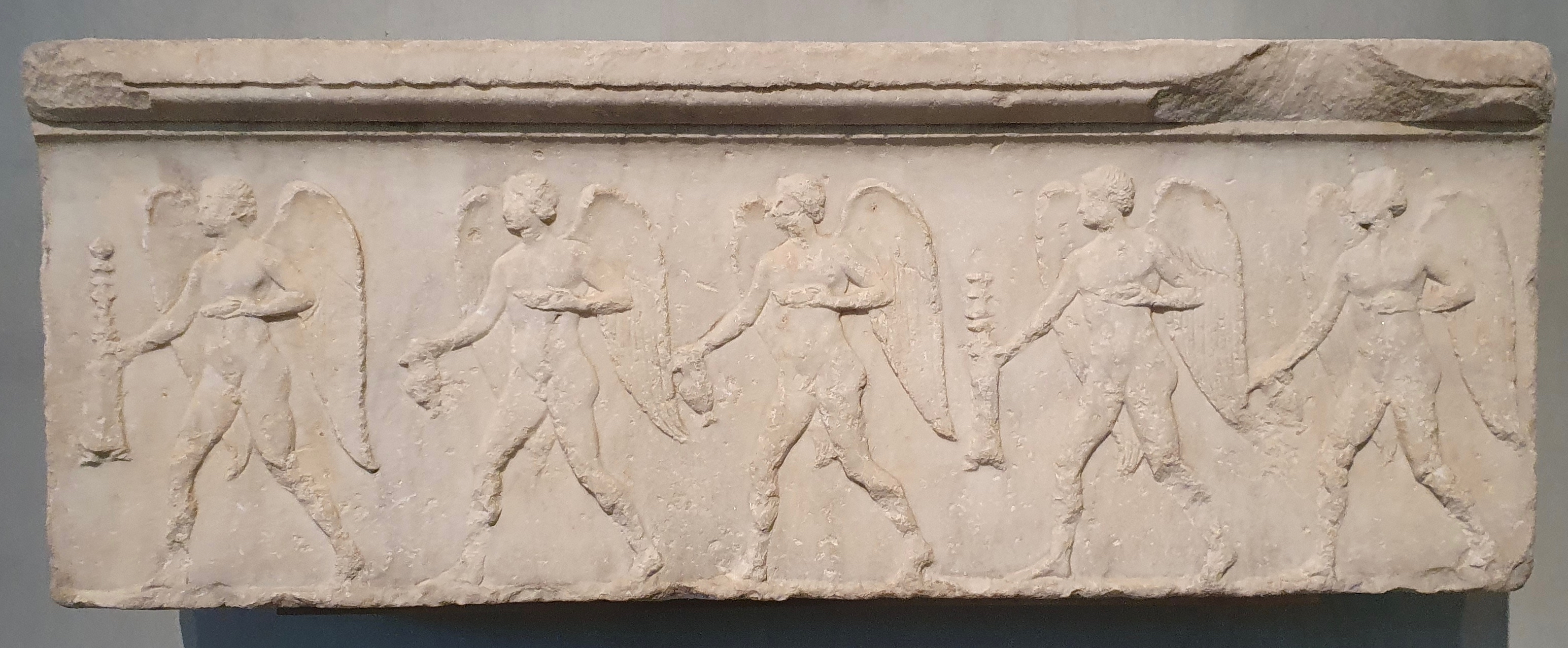

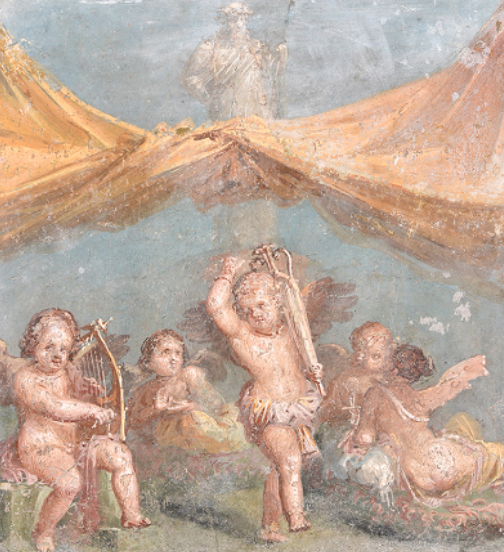

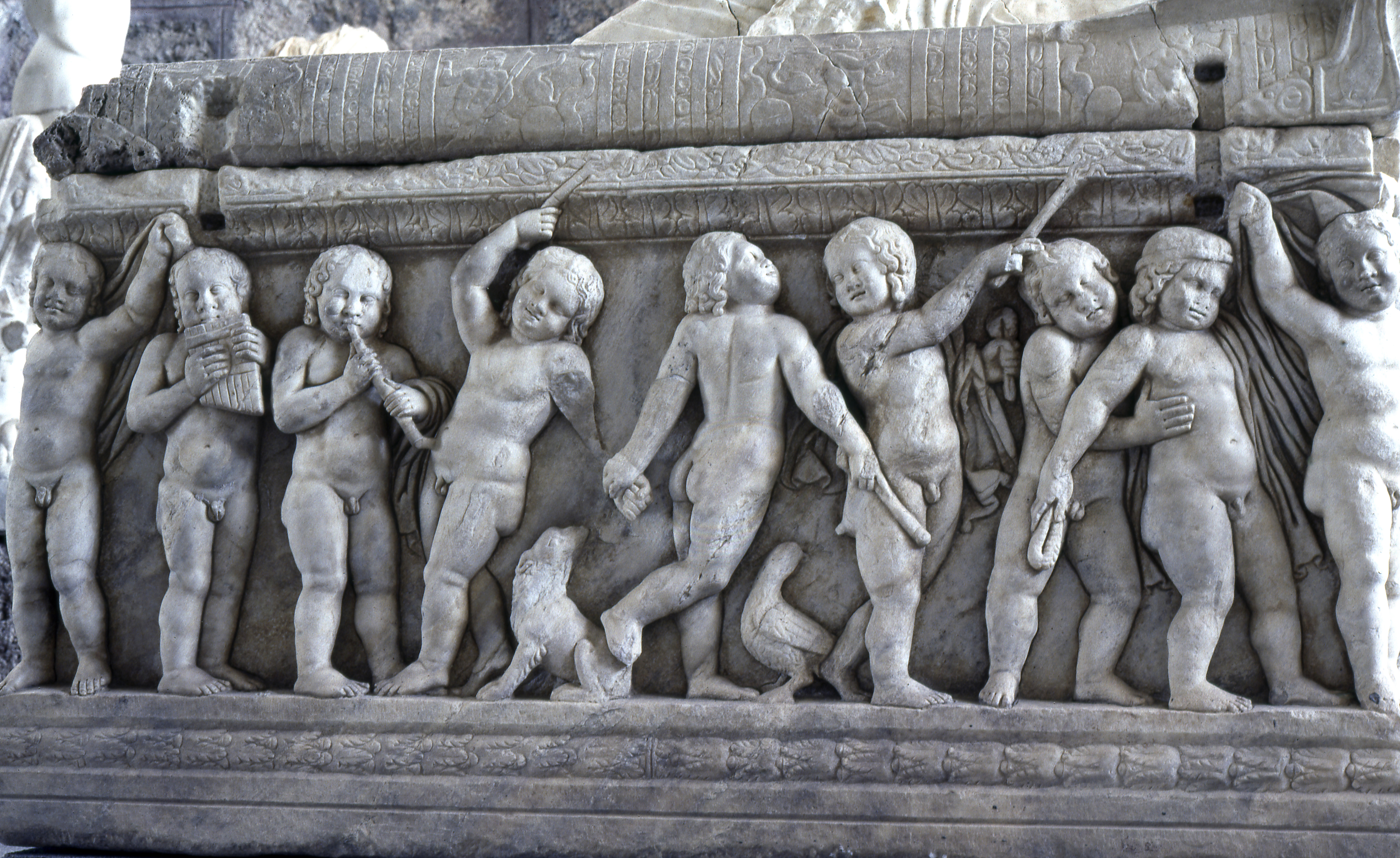

== See also ==
- Cupid
- List of love and lust deities
- LGBT themes in mythology
- Harmonia
