= Apeiron =

Greek word meaning 'something infinite'

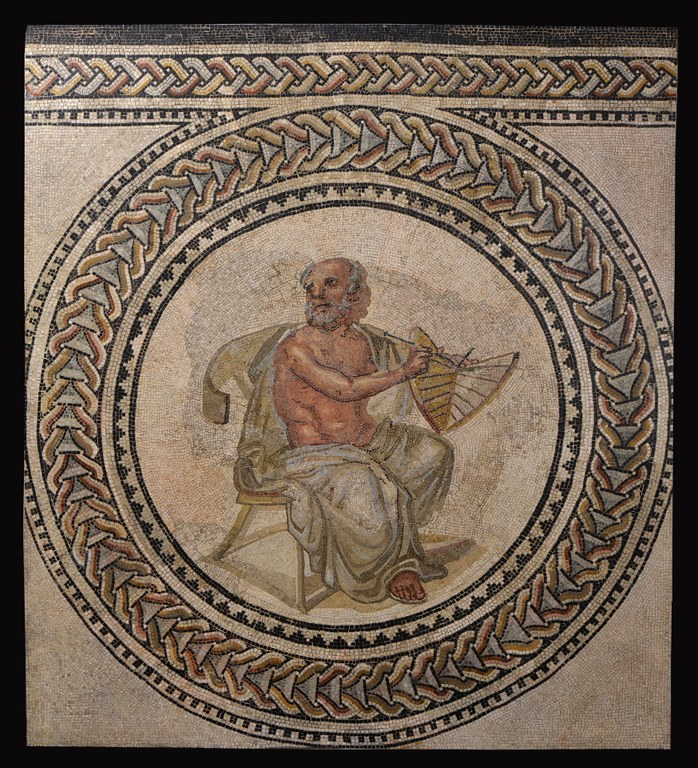
A mosaic from Johannisstraße, Trier, dating to the early third century AD, showing the Pre-Socratic Greek philosopher Anaximander of Miletus holding a sundial.

Apeiron (/əˈpaɪˌrɒn/; ἄπειρον) is a Greek word meaning '(that which is) unlimited; boundless; infinite; indefinite' from ἀ- a- 'without' and πεῖραρ peirar 'end, limit; boundary', the Ionic Greek form of πέρας peras 'end, limit, boundary'.

== Origin of everything ==
The apeiron is central to the cosmological theory created by Anaximander, a 6th-century BC pre-Socratic Greek philosopher whose work is mostly lost. From the few existing fragments, we learn that he believed the beginning or ultimate reality (arche) is eternal and infinite, or boundless (apeiron), subject to neither old age nor decay, which perpetually yields fresh materials from which everything we can perceive is derived. Apeiron generated the opposites (hot–cold, wet–dry, etc.) which acted on the creation of the world (cf. Heraclitus). Everything is generated from apeiron and then it is destroyed by going back to apeiron, according to necessity. He believed that infinite worlds are generated from apeiron and then they are destroyed there again.

His ideas were influenced by the Greek mythical tradition and by his teacher Thales (7th to 6th century BC). Searching for some universal principle, Anaximander retained the traditional religious assumption that there was a cosmic order and tried to explain it rationally, using the old mythical language which ascribed divine control on various spheres of reality. This language was more suitable for a society which could see gods everywhere; therefore the first glimmerings of laws of nature were themselves derived from divine laws. The Greeks believed that the universal principles could also be applied to human societies. The word nomos (law) may originally have meant natural law and used later to mean man-made law.

Greek philosophy entered a high level of abstraction. It adopted apeiron as the origin of all things, because it is completely indefinite. This is a further transition from the previous existing mythical way of thought to the newer rational way of thought which is the main characteristic of the archaic period (8th to 6th century BC). This shift in thought is correlated with the new political conditions in the Greek city states during the 6th century BC.

== Roots ==
In the mythical Greek cosmogony of Hesiod (8th to 7th century BC) the first primordial god is Chaos, which is a void or gap. Chaos is described as a gap either between Tartarus and the Earth's surface (Miller's interpretation) or between earth's surface and the sky (Cornford's interpretation). One can name it also abyss (having no bottom).

Alternately, Greek philosopher Thales believed that the origin or first principle was water. Pherecydes of Syros (6th century BC) probably called the water also Chaos and this is not placed at the very beginning.

In the creation stories of Near East the primordial world is described formless and empty. The only existing thing prior to creation was the water abyss. The Babylonian cosmology Enuma Elish describes the earliest stage of the universe as one of watery chaos and something similar is described in Genesis. In the Hindu cosmogony which is similar to the Vedic (Hiranyagarbha) the initial state of the universe was an absolute darkness.

Hesiod made an abstraction, because his original chaos is a void, something completely indefinite. In his opinion the origin should be indefinite and indeterminate. The indefiniteness is spatial in early usages as in Homer (indefinite sea). A fragment from Xenophanes (6th century BC) shows the transition from chaos to apeiron: "The upper limit of earth borders on air. The lower limit reaches down to the unlimited. (i.e. the Apeiron)". Either apeiron meant the "spatial indefinite" and was implied to be indefinite in kind, or Anaximander intended it primarily 'that which is indefinite in kind' but assumed it also to be of unlimited extent and duration. His ideas may have been influenced by the Pythagoreans:

[...] for they [the Pythagoreans] plainly say that when the one had been constructed, whether out of planes or of surface or of seed or of elements which they cannot express, immediately the nearest part of the unlimited began to be drawn in and limited by the limit.

Greek philosophy entered a high level of abstraction making apeiron the principle of all things and some scholars saw a gap between the existing mythical and the new rational way of thought (rationalism). But if we follow the course, we will see that there is not such an abrupt break with the previous thought. The basic elements of nature, water, air, fire, earth, which the first Greek philosophers believed composed the world, represent in fact the mythical primordial forces. The collision of these forces produced the cosmic harmony according to the Greek cosmogony (Hesiod). Anaximander noticed the mutual changes between these elements, therefore he chose something else (indefinite in kind) which could generate the others without experiencing any decay.

There is also a fragment attributed to his teacher Thales: "What is divine? What has no origin, nor end." This probably led his student to his final decision for apeiron, because the divinity applied to it implies that it always existed. The notion of the temporal infinity was familiar to the Greek mind from remote antiquity in the religious conception of immortality and Anaximander's description was in terms appropriate to this conception. This arche is called "eternal and ageless" (Hippolitus I,6,I;DK B2).

== Creation of the world ==
The apeiron has generally been understood as a sort of primal chaos. It acts as the substratum supporting opposites such as hot and cold, wet and dry, and directed the movement of things, by which there grew up all of the host of shapes and differences which are found in the world. Out of the vague and limitless body there sprang a central mass—Earth—cylindrical in shape. A sphere of fire surrounded the air around the Earth and had originally clung to it like the bark round a tree. When it broke, it created the Sun, the Moon and the stars. The first animals were generated in the water. When they came to Earth they were transmuted by the effect of sunlight. The human being sprung from some other animal, which originally was similar to a fish. The blazing orbs, which have drawn off from the cold earth and water, are the temporary gods of the world clustering around the Earth, which to the ancient thinker is the central figure.

== Interpretations ==
In the commentary of Simplicius on Aristotle's Physics the following fragment is attributed direct to Anaximander:

Whence things have their origin, there their destruction happens as it is ordained [Greek: kata to chreon means 'according to the debt']. For they give justice and compensation to one another for their injustice according to the ordering of time.

This fragment remains a mystery because it can be translated in different ways. Simplicius comments that Anaximander noticed the mutual changes between the four elements (earth, air, water, fire), therefore he did not choose one of them as an origin, but something else which generates the opposites without experiencing any decay. He mentions also that Anaximander said all these in poetic terms, meaning that he used the old mythical language. The Goddess Justice (Dike), appears to keep the order. The quotation is close to the original meanings of the relevant Greek words. The word dike (justice) was probably originally derived from the boundaries of a man's land and transmits metaphorically the notion that somebody must remain in his own sphere, respecting the one of his neighbour. The word adikia (injustice) means that someone has operated outside of his own sphere, something that could disturb "law and order" (eunomia). In Homer's Odyssey eunomia is contrasted with hubris (arrogance). Arrogance was considered very dangerous because it could break the balance and lead to political instability and finally to the destruction of a city-state.

Aetius (1st century BC) transmits a different quotation:

Everything is generated from apeiron and there its destruction happens. Infinite worlds are generated and they are destructed there again. And he says (Anaximander) why this is apeiron. Because only then genesis and decay will never stop.

— Aetius I 3,3<Ps.Plutarch; DK 12 A14.>

Therefore, it seems that Anaximander argued about apeiron and this is also noticed by Aristotle:

The belief that there is something apeiron stems from the idea that only then genesis and decay will never stop, when that from which is taken what is generated is apeiron.

— Aristotle, Physics 203b 18–20 <DK 12 A 15.>

Friedrich Nietzsche claimed that Anaximander was a pessimist and that he viewed all coming to be as an illegitimate emancipation from the eternal being, a wrong for which destruction is the only penance. In accordance to this the world of the individual definite objects should perish into the indefinite since anything definite has to eventually return to the indefinite. His ideas had a great influence on many scholars including Martin Heidegger.

Werner Heisenberg, noted for his contributions to the foundation of quantum mechanics, arrived at the idea that the elementary particles are to be seen as different manifestations, different quantum states, of one and the same "primordial substance". Because of its similarity to the primordial substance hypothesized by Anaximander, his colleague Max Born called this substance apeiron.

Scholars in other fields, e.g. Bertrand Russell and Maurice Bowra, did not deny that Anaximander was the first who used the term apeiron, but claimed that the mysterious fragment is dealing with the balance of opposite forces as central to reality being closer to the quotation transmitted by Simplicius.

There are also other interpretations which try to match both the previous aspects. Apeiron is an abstract, void, something that cannot be described according to the Greek pessimistic belief for death. Death indeed meant "nothingless". The dead live like shadows and there is no return to the real world. Everything generated from apeiron must return there according to the principle genesis-decay. There is a polar attraction between the opposites genesis-decay, arrogance-justice. The existence itself carries a guilt.

The idea that the fact of existence by itself carries along an incurable guilt is Greek (Theognis 327) and anybody claims that surpasses it, commits arrogance and therefore he becomes guilty. The first half of the 6th century is a period of great social instability in Miletus, the city state where Anaximander lives. Any attempt of excess leads to exaggerations and each exaggeration must be corrected. All these have to be paid according to the debt. The things give justice to one another with the process of time.

Justice has to destroy everything which is born. There is no external limit that can restrict the activities of men, except the destruction. Arrogance is an expression of the chaotic element of human existence and in a way a part of the rebounding mechanism of order, because pushing it to exertions causes destruction which is also a reestablishment.

== Influence on Greek and Western thought ==
We may assume that the contradiction in the different interpretations is because Anaximander combined two different ways of thought. The first one dealing with apeiron is metaphysical (and can lead to monism), while the second one dealing with mutual changes and the balance of the opposites as central to reality is physical. The same paradox existed in the Greek way of thought. The Greeks believed that each individual had unlimitable potentialities both in brain and in heart, an outlook which called a man to live at the top of his powers. But that there was a limit to his most violent ambitions, that arrogance-injustice (hubris or adikia) could disturb the harmony and balance. In that case justice (dike) would destroy him to reestablish the order. These ideas are obvious in later Greek philosophers. Philolaus (5th century BC) mentions that nature constituted and is organized with the world from unlimitable (Ancient Greek: ἄπειρα apeira, plural of apeiron) and limitable. Everything which exists in the world contains the unlimited (apeiron) and the limited. Something similar is mentioned by Plato: Nothing can exist if it does not contain continually and simultaneously the limited and the unlimited, the definite and the indefinite.

Some doctrines existing in Western thought still transmit some of the original ideas: "God ordained that all men shall die", "Death is a common debt". The Greek word adikia (injustice) transmits the notion that someone has operated outside of his own sphere, without respecting the one of his neighbour. Therefore, he commits hubris. The relative English word arrogance (claim as one's own without justification; Latin: arrogare), is very close to the original meaning of the aphorism: "Nothing in excess."

== Other pre-Socratic philosophies ==
Other pre-Socratic philosophers had different theories of the apeiron. For the Pythagoreans (in particular, Philolaus), the universe had begun as an apeiron, but at some point it inhaled the void from outside, filling the cosmos with vacuous bubbles that split the world into many different parts. For Anaxagoras, the initial apeiron had begun to rotate rapidly under the control of a godlike Nous (Mind), and the great speed of the rotation caused the universe to break up into many fragments. Since all individual things had originated from the same apeiron, all things must contain parts of all other things. This explains how one object can be transformed into another, since each thing already contains all other things in germ.

== See also ==
- Apeirogon
- Arche
- Ein Sof
- Brahman
- God
- Idealism
- Infinity
- Neutral monism
- Taiji (philosophy)
- Theogony
- Tzimtzum
- Wuji (philosophy)
- Ayin and Yesh
