= Theogony =

8th-century BC didactic poem by Hesiod

- by Hesiod
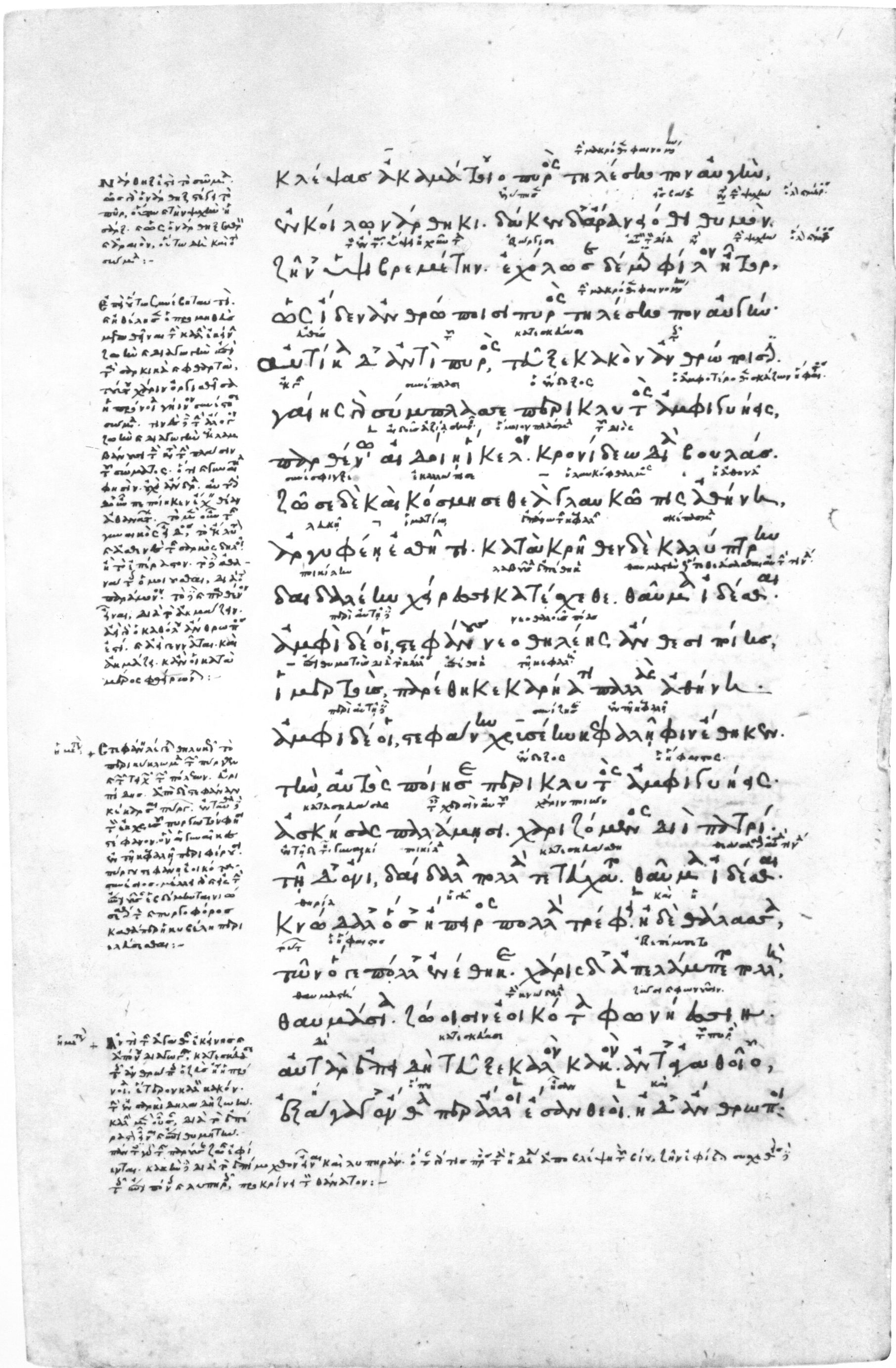
- Fourteenth-century Greek manuscript of Hesiod's Theogony with scholia written in the margins
- Original title: Θεογονία
- Written: 8th century BC
- Language: Ancient Greek
- Subject(s): Greek mythology, Ancient Greek religion
- Genre(s): Epic, Didactic
- Lines: 1022

Full text
- Theogony at Wikisource
- Θεογονία at Greek Wikisource

The Theogony (Ancient Greek: Θεογονία, romanized: Theogonía, lit. 'the genealogy or birth of the gods') is a poem by Hesiod (8th–7th century BC) describing the origins and genealogies of the Greek gods, composed c. 730–700 BC. It is written in the epic dialect of Ancient Greek and contains 1,022 lines. It is one of the most important sources for the understanding of early Greek cosmology.

== Description ==
Hesiod's Theogony is a large-scale synthesis of a vast variety of local Greek traditions concerning the gods, organized as a narrative that tells how they came to be and how they established permanent control over the cosmos. It is the first known Greek mythical cosmogony. The initial state of the universe is chaos, a dark indefinite void considered a divine primordial condition from which everything else appeared. Theogonies are a part of Greek mythology which embodies the desire to articulate reality as a whole, to describe the entire universe and its coming into being. This universalizing impulse was fundamental to the first later (and indeed ongoing) projects of speculative theorizing.

Further, in the "Kings and Singers" passage (80–103) Hesiod appropriates to himself the authority usually reserved to sacred kingship. The poet declares that it is he, where we might have expected some king instead, upon whom the Muses have bestowed the two gifts of a scepter and an authoritative voice (Hesiod, Theogony 30–3), which are the visible signs of kingship. It is not that this claim is meant to make Hesiod a king. Rather, the point is that the authority of kingship now belongs to the poetic voice, the voice that is declaiming the Theogony.

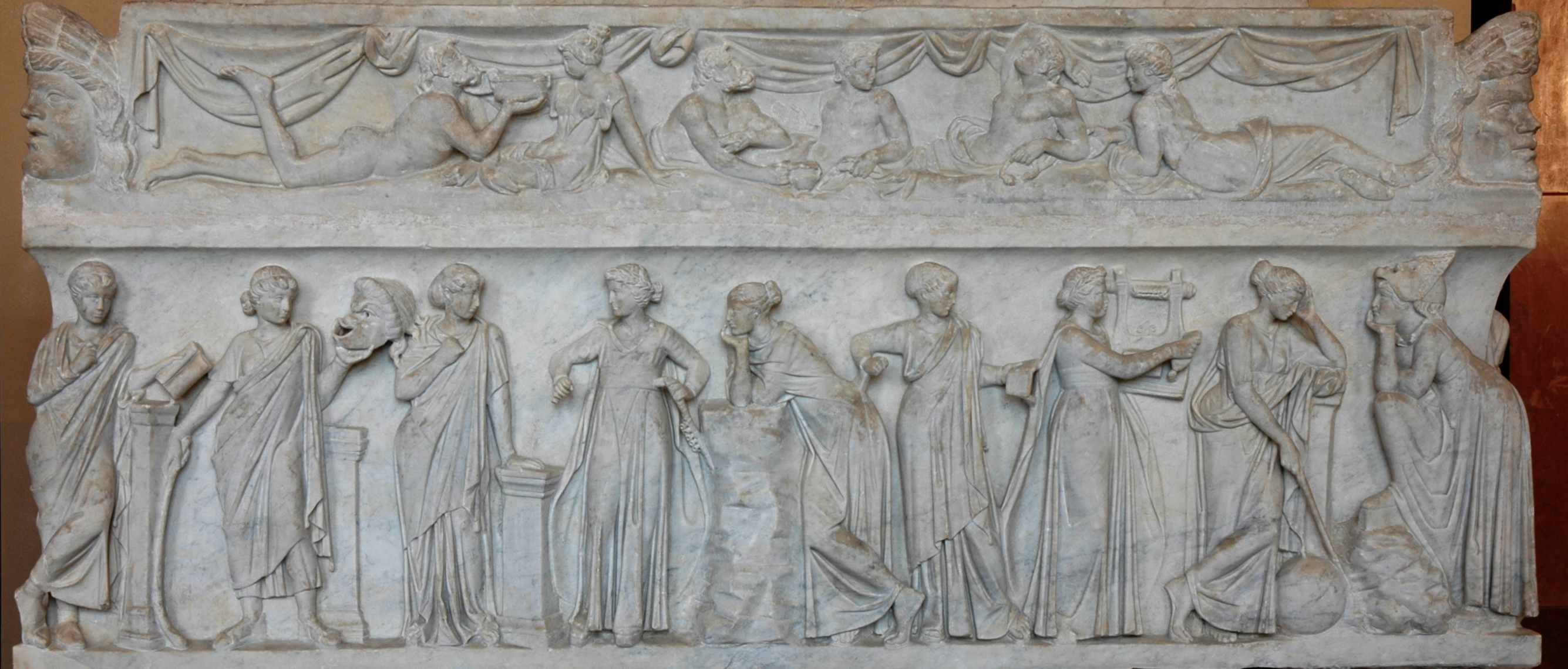
The nine muses on a Roman sarcophagus (second century AD)—Louvre, Paris

Although it is often used as a sourcebook for Greek mythology, the Theogony is both more and less than that. In formal terms it is a hymn invoking Zeus and the Muses: parallel passages between it and the much shorter Homeric Hymn to the Muses make it clear that the Theogony developed out of a tradition of hymnic preludes — the often sung, descriptive works with which an ancient Greek rhapsode would begin his performance at poetic competitions. It is necessary to see the Theogony not as the definitive source of Greek mythology, but rather as a snapshot of a dynamic tradition that happened to crystallize when Hesiod formulated the myths he knew — and to remember that the traditions evolved further since that time.

The written form of the Theogony was established in the 6th century BC. Even some conservative editors have concluded that the Typhon episode (820–68) is an interpolation.

Hesiod was probably influenced by some Near-Eastern traditions, such as the Babylonian Dynasty of Dunnum, which were mixed with local traditions, but they are more likely to be lingering traces from the Mycenaean tradition than the result of oriental contacts in Hesiod's own time.

The decipherment of Hittite mythical texts, notably the Kingship in Heaven text first presented in 1946, with its castration mytheme, offers in the figure of Kumarbi an Anatolian parallel to Hesiod's Uranus–Cronus conflict.

== The succession myth ==
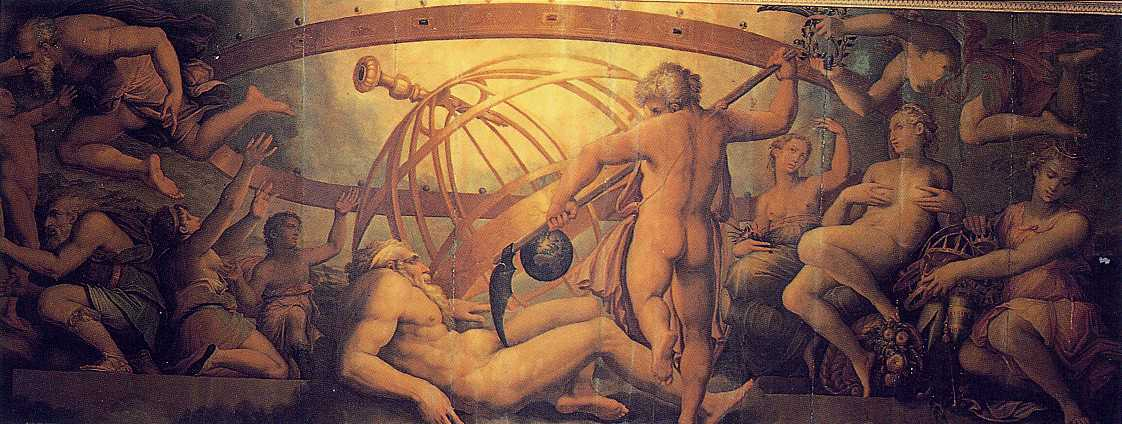
The Mutilation of Uranus by Saturn: fresco by Giorgio Vasari and Cristofano Gherardi, c. 1560 (Sala di Cosimo I, Palazzo Vecchio)

One of the principal components of the Theogony is the presentation of what is called the "succession myth", which tells how Cronus overthrew Uranus, and how in turn Zeus overthrew Cronus and his fellow Titans, and how Zeus was eventually established as the final and permanent ruler of the cosmos.

Uranus (Sky) initially produced eighteen children with his mother Gaia (Earth): the twelve Titans, the three Cyclopes, and the three Hecatoncheires (Hundred-Handers), but hating them, he hid them away somewhere inside Gaia. Angry and in distress, Gaia fashioned a sickle made of adamant and urged her children to punish their father. Only her son Cronus, the youngest Titan, was willing to do so. So Gaia hid Cronus in "ambush" and gave him the adamantine sickle, and when Uranus came to lie with Gaia, Cronus reached out and castrated his father. This enabled the Titans to be born and Cronus to assume supreme command of the cosmos.

Cronus, having now taken over control of the cosmos from Uranus, wanted to ensure that he maintained control. Uranus and Gaia had prophesied to Cronus that one of Cronus' own children would overthrow him, so when Cronus married Rhea, he made sure to swallow each of the children she birthed: Hestia, Demeter, Hera, Hades, Poseidon, and Zeus (in that order), to Rhea's great sorrow. However, when Rhea was pregnant with Zeus, Rhea begged her parents Gaia and Uranus to help her save Zeus. So they sent Rhea to Lyctus on Crete to bear Zeus, and Gaia took the newborn Zeus to raise, hiding him deep in a cave beneath Mount Aigaion. Meanwhile, Rhea gave Cronus a huge stone wrapped in baby's clothes which he swallowed thinking that it was another of Rhea's children.

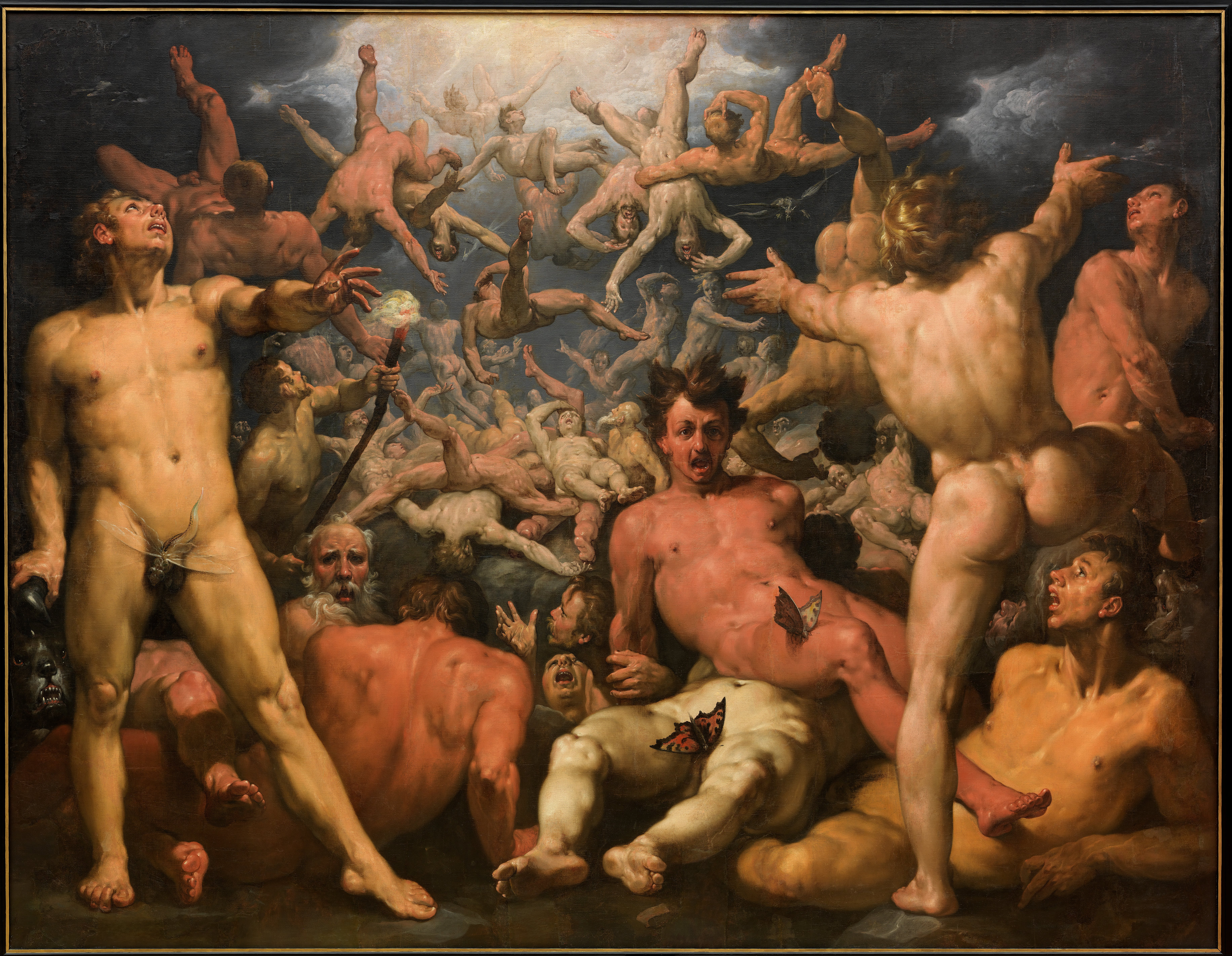
The Fall of the Titans by Cornelis Cornelisz van Haarlem (1596–1598)

Zeus, now grown, forced Cronus (using some unspecified trickery of Gaia) to disgorge his other five children. Zeus then released his uncles the Cyclopes (apparently still imprisoned beneath the earth, along with the Hundred-Handers, where Uranus had originally confined them) who then provide Zeus with his great weapon, the thunderbolt, which had been hidden by Gaia. A great war was begun, the Titanomachy, between the new gods, Zeus and his siblings, and the old gods, Cronus and the Titans, for control of the cosmos. In the tenth year of that war, following Gaia's counsel, Zeus released the Hundred-Handers, who joined the war against the Titans, helping Zeus to gain the upper hand. Zeus then cast the fury of his thunderbolt at the Titans, defeating them and throwing them into Tartarus, thus ending the Titanomachy.

A final threat to Zeus' power was to come in the form of the monster Typhon, son of Gaia and Tartarus. Zeus with his thunderbolt was quickly victorious, and Typhon was also imprisoned in Tartarus.

Zeus, by Gaia's advice, was elected king of the gods, and he distributed various honors among the gods. Zeus then married his first wife Metis, but when he learned that Metis was fated to produce a son which might overthrow his rule, by the advice of Gaia and Uranus, Zeus swallowed Metis (while still pregnant with Athena). And so Zeus managed to end the cycle of succession and secure his eternal rule over the cosmos.

== The genealogies ==
=== The first gods ===
The world began with the spontaneous generation of four beings: first arose Chaos (Chasm); then came Gaia (Earth), "the ever-sure foundation of all"; "dim" Tartarus, in the depths of the Earth; and Eros (Desire) "fairest among the deathless gods". From Chaos came Erebus (Darkness) and Nyx (Night). And Nyx "from union in love" with Erebus produced Aether (Brightness) and Hemera (Day). From Gaia came Uranus (Sky), the Ourea (Mountains), and Pontus (Sea).

The first gods

Chaos	Gaia	Tartarus	Eros
Erebus	Nyx	Uranus	The Ourea	Pontus
Aether	Hemera

=== Children of Gaia and Uranus ===
Uranus mated with Gaia, and she gave birth to the twelve Titans: Oceanus, Coeus, Crius, Hyperion, Iapetus, Theia, Rhea, Themis, Mnemosyne, Phoebe, Tethys and Cronus; the Cyclopes: Brontes, Steropes and Arges; and the Hecatoncheires ("Hundred-Handers"): Cottus, Briareos, and Gyges.

Children of Gaia (Earth) and Uranus (Sky)

Gaia	Uranus
Oceanus	Crius	Iapetus	Rhea	Mnemosyne	Tethys
Coeus	Hyperion	Theia	Themis	Phoebe	Cronus
The Titans
Brontes	Steropes	Arges
The Cyclopes
Cottus	Briareos	Gyges
The Hundred-Handers

=== Children of Gaia and Uranus' blood, and Uranus' genitals ===
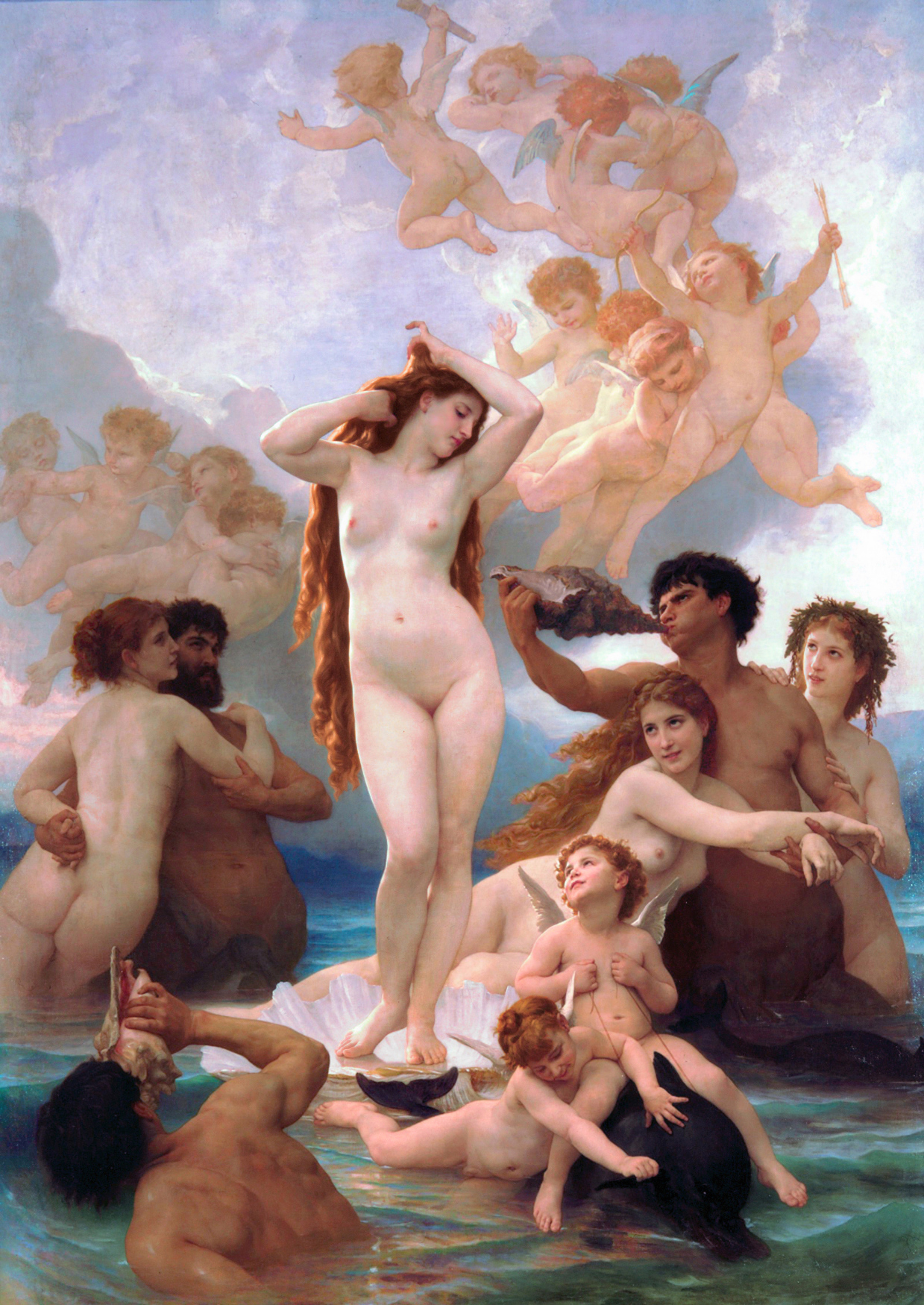
The Birth of Venus by William-Adolphe Bouguereau (c. 1879)

When Cronus castrated Uranus, from Uranus' blood which splattered onto the earth, came the Erinyes (Furies), the Giants, and the Meliai (the nymphs of the ash tree). Cronus threw the severed genitals into the sea, around which foam developed and transformed into the goddess Aphrodite.

Children of Gaia and Uranus' blood, and Uranus' genitals

Gaia	Uranus' blood		Uranus' genitals
The Erinyes	The Giants	The Meliae	Aphrodite

=== Descendants of Nyx ===
Meanwhile, Nyx (Night) alone produced children: Moros (Doom), Ker (Destiny), Thanatos (Death), Hypnos (Sleep), Oneiroi (Dreams), Momus (Blame), Oizys (Pain), Hesperides (Daughters of Night), Moirai (Fates), Keres (Destinies), Nemesis (Retribution), Apate (Deceit), Philotes (Love), Geras (Old Age), and Eris (Discord).

And from Eris alone, came Ponos (Hardship), Lethe (Forgetfulness), Limos (Starvation), Algea (Pains), Hysminai (Battles), Makhai (Wars), Phonoi (Murders), Androktasiai (Manslaughters), Neikea (Quarrels), Pseudea (Lies), Logoi (Stories), Amphillogiai (Disputes), Dysnomia (Anarchy), Ate (Ruin), and Horkos (Oath).

Children of Nyx (Night) and Eris (Discord)

Nyx
Moros	Thanatos	Oneiroi	Oizys	Moirai	Nemesis	Philotes
Ker	Hypnos	Momus	Hesperides	Keres	Apate	Geras
Eris
Ponos	Limos	Hysminai	Phonoi	Neikea	Logoi	Dysnomia	Horkos
Lethe	Algea	Makhai	Androktasiai	Pseudea	Amphillogiai	Ate

=== Descendants of Gaia and Pontus ===
After Uranus's castration, Gaia mated with her son Pontus (Sea) producing a descendent line consisting primarily of sea deities, sea nymphs, and hybrid monsters. Their first child Nereus (Old Man of the Sea) married Doris, one of the Oceanid daughters of the Titans Oceanus and Tethys, and they produced the Nereids, fifty sea nymphs, which included Amphitrite, Thetis, and Psamathe. Their second child Thaumas married Electra, another Oceanid, and their offspring were Iris (Rainbow) and the two Harpies: Aello and Ocypete.

Gaia and Pontus' third and fourth children, Phorcys and Ceto, married each other and produced the two Graiae: Pemphredo and Enyo, and the three Gorgons: Stheno, Euryale, and Medusa. Poseidon mated with Medusa and two offspring, the winged horse Pegasus and the warrior Chrysaor, were born when the hero Perseus cut off Medusa's head. Chrysaor married Callirhoe, another Oceanid, and they produced the three-headed Geryon. Next comes the half-nymph half-snake Echidna (her mother is unclear, probably Ceto, or possibly Callirhoe). The last offspring of Ceto and Phorcys was a serpent (unnamed in the Theogony, later called Ladon, by Apollonius of Rhodes) who guards the golden apples.

Descendants of Gaia and Pontus (Sea), and Phorcys and Ceto

Gaia	Pontus
Nereus	Doris	Thaumas	Electra	Phorcys	Ceto	Eurybia
The Nereids	Iris	Aello	Ocypete
The Harpies
Pemphredo	Enyo	Echidna?	(Ladon)
The Graiai
Sthenno	Euryale	Medusa	Poseidon
The Gorgons
Pegasus	Chrysaor	Callirhoe
Geryon

=== Descendants of Echidna and Typhon ===
Gaia also mated with Tartarus to produce Typhon, whom Echidna married, producing several monstrous descendants. Their first three offspring were Orthus, Cerberus, and the Hydra. Next comes the Chimera (whose mother is unclear, either Echidna or the Hydra). Finally Orthus (his mate is unclear, either the Chimera or Echidna) produced two offspring: the Sphinx and the Nemean Lion.

Descendants of Echidna and Typhon

Gaia	Tartarus
Echidna	Typhon	Echidna (or Hydra?)
Orthus	Cerberus	Hydra	Chimera
Chimera (or Echidna?)
Sphinx	Nemean lion

=== Descendants of the Titans ===
The Titans, Oceanus, Hyperion, Coeus, and Cronus married their sisters Tethys, Theia, Phoebe and Rhea, and Crius married his half-sister Eurybia, the daughter of Gaia and her son, Pontus. From Oceanus and Tethys came the three thousand river gods (including Nilus [Nile], Alpheus, and Scamander) and three thousand Oceanid nymphs (including Doris, Electra, Callirhoe, Styx, Clymene, Metis, Eurynome, Perseis, and Idyia). From Hyperion and Theia came Helios (Sun), Selene (Moon), and Eos (Dawn), and from Crius and Eurybia came Astraios, Pallas, and Perses. From Eos and Astraios came the winds: Zephyrus, Boreas and Notos, Eosphoros (Dawn-bringer, i.e. Venus, the Morning Star), and the Stars. From Pallas and the Oceanid Styx came Zelus (Envy), Nike (Victory), Kratos (Power), and Bia (Force).

From Coeus and Phoebe came Leto and Asteria, who married Perses, producing Hekate, and from Cronus and his older sister, Rhea, came Hestia, Demeter, Hera, Hades, Poseidon, and Zeus. The Titan Iapetos married the Oceanid Clymene and produced Atlas, Menoetius, Prometheus, and Epimetheus.

Descendants of the Titans

Uranus	Gaia	Pontus
Oceanus	Tethys	Hyperion	Theia	Crius	Eurybia
The Rivers	The Oceanids	Helios	Selene	Eos	Astraeus	Pallas	Perses
Zephyrus	Boreas	Notos	Eosphoros	Stars
Styx
Zelus	Nike	Kratos	Bia
Coeus	Phoebe
Leto	Asteria
Hecate
Cronus	Rhea
Hestia	Demeter	Hera	Hades	Poseidon	Zeus
Iapetus	Clymene
Atlas	Menoetius	Prometheus	Epimetheus

=== Children of Zeus and his seven partners ===
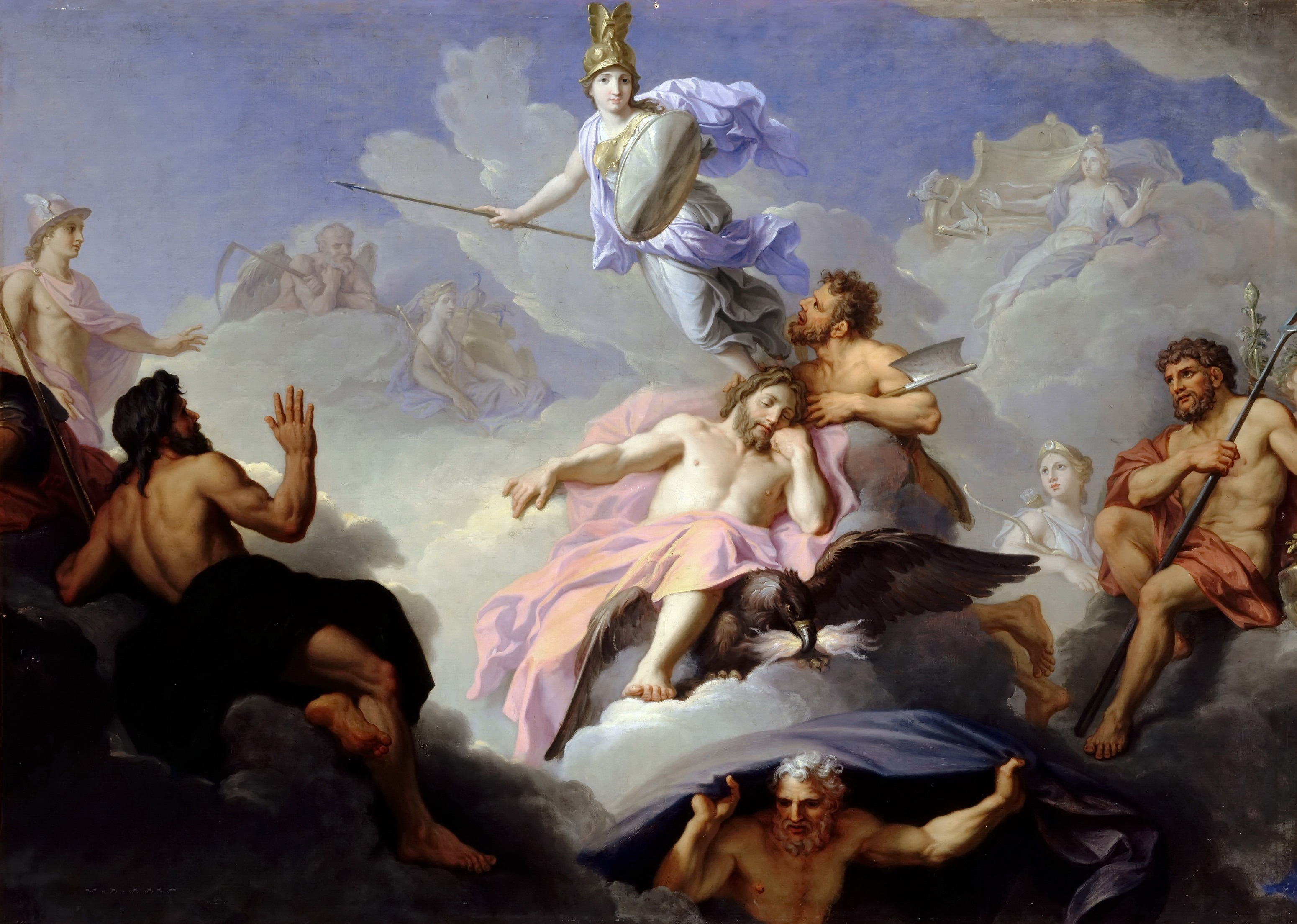
The Birth of Minerva by René-Antoine Houasse (before 1688)

Zeus mated then with seven goddesses, of whom three - Metis, Themis and Hera - are explicitly stated to be married to him. His first wife was the Oceanid Metis, whom he impregnated with Athena, then, on the advice of Gaia and Uranus, swallowed Metis so that no son of his by Metis would overthrow him, as had been foretold. Zeus' second wife was his aunt the Titan Themis, who bore the three Horae (Seasons): Eunomia (Order), Dikē (Justice), Eirene (Peace); and the three Moirai (Fates): Clotho (Spinner), Lachesis (Allotter), and Atropos (Unbending). Zeus then had relationship with another Oceanid, Eurynome, who bore the three Charites (Graces): Aglaea (Splendor), whom Hephaestus married, Euphrosyne (Joy), and Thalia (Good Cheer).

Zeus' fourth partner was his sister, Demeter, who bore Persephone. The fifth partner of Zeus was another aunt, the Titan Mnemosyne, from whom came the nine Muses: Clio, Euterpe, Thalia, Melpomene, Terpsichore, Erato, Polymnia, Urania, and Calliope. His sixth partner was the Titan Leto, who gave birth to Apollo and Artemis. Zeus' seventh partner and final wife was his sister Hera, the mother by Zeus of Hebe, Ares, and Eileithyia.

Zeus finally "gave birth" himself to Athena, from his head, which angered Hera so much that she produced, by herself, her own son Hephaestus, god of fire and blacksmiths.

Children of Zeus and his seven partners

Zeus
Metis
Athena
Themis
Eunomia	Dike	Eirene	Clotho	Lachesis	Atropos
The Horae	The Moirai
Eurynome	Demeter
Aglaea	Euphrosyne	Thalia	Persephone
The Charites
Mnemosyne
Clio	Thaleia	Terpsichore	Polyhymnia	Calliope
Euterpe	Melpomene	Erato	Urania
The Muses
Leto	Hera
Apollo	Artemis	Hebe	Ares	Eileithyia	Hephaestus

=== Other descendants of divine fathers ===
From Poseidon and the Nereid Amphitrite was born Triton, and from Ares and Aphrodite came Phobos (Fear), Deimos (Terror), and Harmonia (Harmony). Zeus, with Atlas's daughter Maia, produced Hermes, and with the mortal Alcmene, produced the hero Heracles, who married Hebe. Zeus and the mortal Semele, daughter of Harmonia and Cadmus, the founder and first king of Thebes, produced Dionysus, who married Ariadne, daughter of Minos, king of Crete. Helios and the Oceanid Perseis produced Circe, Aeetes, who became king of Colchis and married the Oceanid Idyia, producing Medea.

Other descendants of divine fathers

Poseidon	Amphitrite	Ares	Aphrodite
Triton	Phobos	Deimos	Harmonia	Cadmus
Zeus
Maia	Alcmene	Semele
Hermes	Heracles	Hebe	Dionysus	Ariadne
Helios	Perseis
Circe	Aeetes	Idyia
Medea

=== Children of divine mothers with mortal fathers ===
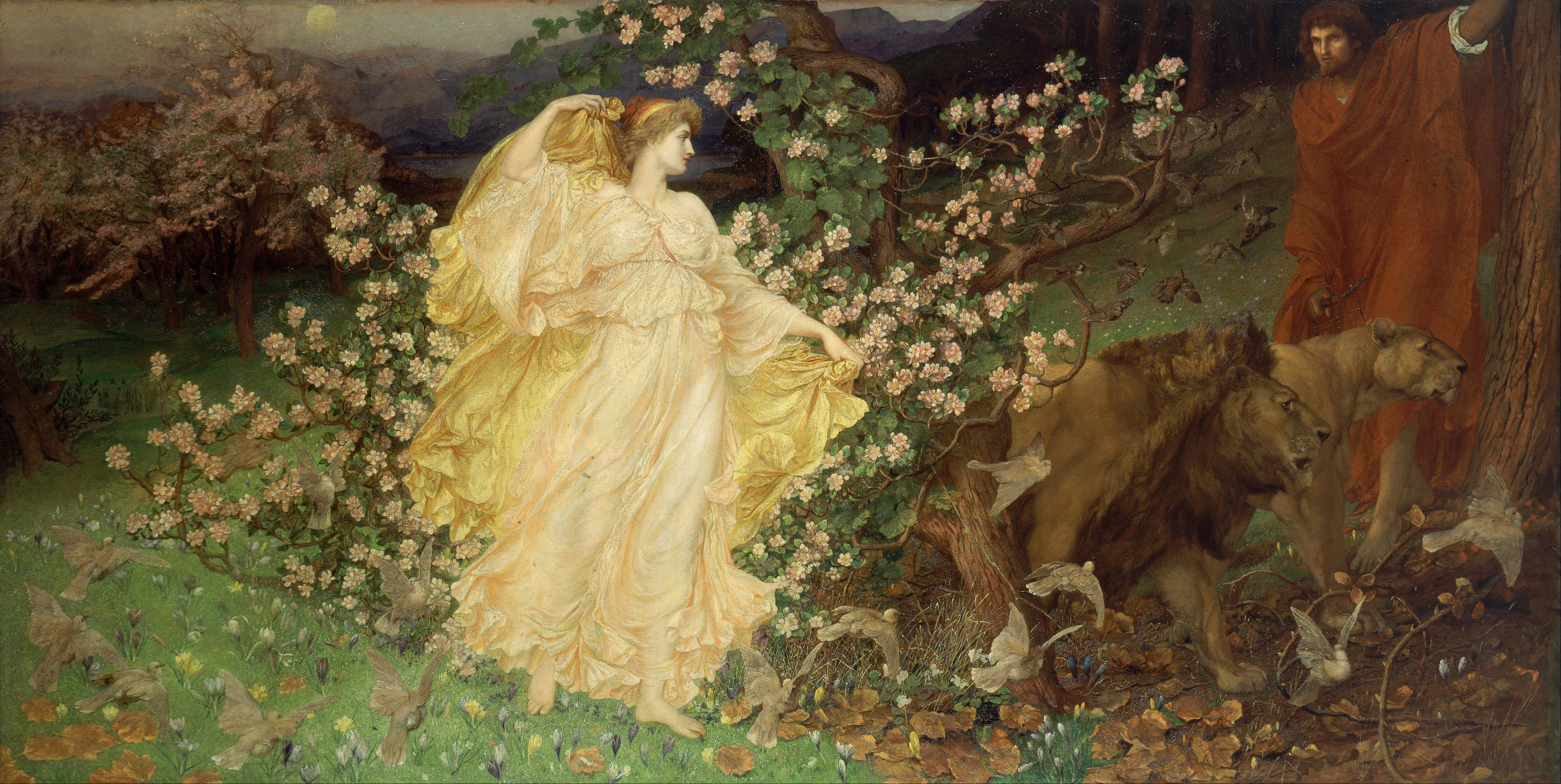
Venus and Anchises by William Blake Richmond (1889 or 1890)

The goddess Demeter joined with the mortal Iasion to produce Plutus. In addition to Semele, the goddess Harmonia and the mortal Cadmus also produced Ino, Agave, Autonoë and Polydorus. Eos (Dawn) with the mortal Tithonus, produced the hero Memnon, and Emathion, and with Cephalus, produced Phaethon. Medea with the mortal Jason, produced Medius, the Nereid Psamathe with the mortal Aeacus, produced the hero Phocus, the Nereid Thetis, with Peleus produced the great warrior Achilles, and the goddess Aphrodite with the mortal Anchises produced the Trojan hero Aeneas. With the hero Odysseus, Circe would give birth to Agrius, Latinus, and Telegonus, and Atlas' daughter Calypso would also bear Odysseus two sons, Nausithoos and Nausinous.

Children of goddesses with mortals

Demeter	Iasion	Harmonia	Cadmus
Plutus	Ino	Semele	Agave	Autonoë	Aristaeus	Polydorus
Tithonus	Eos	Cephalus	Medea	Jason
Memnon	Emathion	Phaethon	Medeius
Psamathe	Aeacus	Thetis	Peleus	Aphrodite	Anchises
Phocus	Achilles	Aeneas
Circe	Odysseus	Calypso
Agrius	Latinus	Telegonus	Nausithous	Nausinous

== Prometheus ==
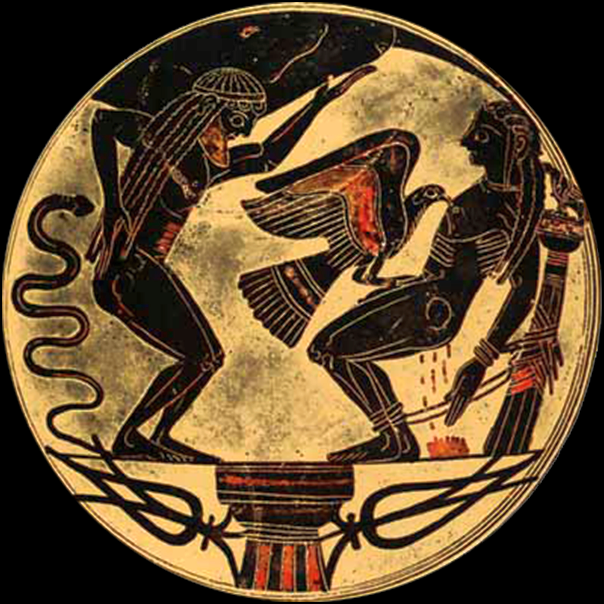
Laconic bowl depicting Prometheus and Atlas enduring their respective punishments, circa 550 BC

The Theogony, after listing the offspring of the Titan Iapetus and the Oceanid Clymene, as Atlas, Menoitios, Prometheus, and Epimetheus, and telling briefly what happened to each, tells the story of Prometheus. When the gods and men met at Mekone to decide how sacrifices should be distributed, Prometheus sought to trick Zeus. Slaughtering an ox, he took the valuable fat and meat, and covered it with the ox's stomach. Prometheus then took the bones and hid them with a thin glistening layer of fat. Prometheus asked Zeus' opinion on which offering pile he found more desirable, hoping to trick the god into selecting the less desirable portion. Though Zeus saw through the trick, he chose the fat covered bones, and so it was established that ever after men would burn the bones as sacrifice to the gods, keeping the choice meat and fat for themselves. But in punishment for this trick, an angry Zeus decided to deny mankind the use of fire. But Prometheus stole fire inside a fennel stalk, and gave it to humanity. Zeus then ordered the creation of the first woman Pandora as a new punishment for mankind. And Prometheus was chained to a cliff, where an eagle fed on his ever-regenerating liver every day, until eventually Zeus' son Heracles came to free him.

== Manuscripts ==
The earliest existing manuscripts of the Theogony date from the end of the 13th century. An early example is found in Vaticanus gr. 1825. This manuscript dates to about 1310 based on watermarks. There are about 64 known manuscripts that date from 1600 AD or earlier.

== Influence on earliest Greek philosophy ==
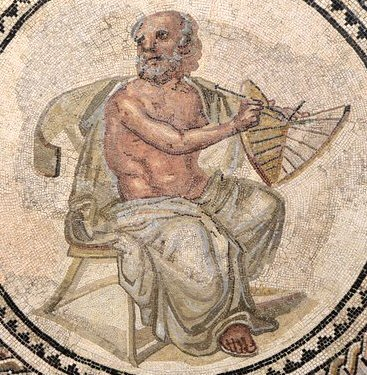
Ancient Roman mosaic from Johannisstraße, Trier, dating to the early third century AD, showing the Pre-Socratic philosopher Anaximander of Miletus holding a sundial

The heritage of Greek mythology already embodied the desire to articulate reality as a whole, and this universalizing impulse was fundamental for the first projects of speculative theorizing. It appears that the order of being was first imaginatively visualized before it was abstractly thought. Hesiod, impressed by necessity governing the ordering of things, discloses a definite pattern in the genesis and appearance of the gods. These ideas made something like cosmological speculation possible. The earliest rhetoric of reflection all centers about two interrelated things: the experience of wonder as a living involvement with the divine order of things; and the absolute conviction that, beyond the totality of things, reality forms a beautiful and harmonious whole.

In the Theogony, the origin (arche) is Chaos, a divine primordial condition, and there are the roots and the ends of the earth, sky, sea, and Tartarus. Pherecydes of Syros (6th century BC), believed that there were three pre-existent divine principles and called the water also Chaos. In the language of the archaic period (8th – 6th century BC), arche (or archai) designates the source, origin, or root of things that exist. If a thing is to be well established or founded, its arche or static point must be secure, and the most secure foundations are those provided by the gods: the indestructible, immutable, and eternal ordering of things.

In ancient Greek philosophy, arche is the element or first principle of all things, a permanent nature or substance which is conserved in the generation of the rest of it. From this, all things come to be, and into it they are resolved in a final state. It is the divine horizon of substance that encompasses and rules all things. Thales (7th – 6th century BC), the first Greek philosopher, claimed that the first principle of all things is water. Anaximander (6th century BC) was the first philosopher who used the term arche for that which writers from Aristotle on call the "substratum". Anaximander claimed that the beginning or first principle is an endless mass (Apeiron) subject to neither age nor decay, from which all things are being born and then they are destroyed there. A fragment from Xenophanes (6th century BC) shows the transition from Chaos to Apeiron: "The upper limit of earth borders on air. The lower limit of earth reaches down to the unlimited (i.e the Apeiron)."

== Christian views of the Theogony ==
John Milton viewed the Theogony as inspired by Satan. Milton's view, as articulated in Paradise Lost, was that once Satan was cast out from heaven, he became the muse that inspired Hesiod. What Hesiod wrote, therefore, was a corruption of the "actual" events that happened in the cosmological struggle of Satan against God. In particular, Milton asserted that the triumph of Zeus (i.e., the supreme deity) through guile, negotiation and alliances, was a corruption of God's omnipotence, which did not require any ally.

Milton's view echoes the views of early Christian patristic writers. Justin Martyr and Athenagoras of Athens, for example, asserted that heathen mythologies in general are demonic distortions of the "true" cosmological history.

== Other cosmogonies in ancient literature ==
In the Theogony the initial state of the universe, or the origin (arche) is Chaos, a gaping void (abyss) considered as a divine primordial condition, from which appeared everything that exists. Then came Gaia (Earth), Tartarus (the cave-like space under the earth; the later-born Erebus is the darkness in this space), and Eros (representing sexual desire—the urge to reproduce—instead of the emotion of love as is the common misconception). Hesiod made an abstraction because his original chaos is something completely indefinite.

By contrast, in the Orphic cosmogony the unaging Chronos produced Aether and Chaos and made a silvery egg in divine Aether. From it appeared the androgynous god Phanes, identified by the Orphics as Eros, who becomes the creator of the world.

Some similar ideas appear in the Vedic and Hindu cosmologies. In the Vedic cosmology the universe is created from nothing by the great heat. Kāma (Desire) the primal seed of spirit, is the link which connected the existent with the non-existent In the Hindu cosmology, in the beginning there was nothing in the universe but only darkness and the divine essence who removed the darkness and created the primordial waters. His seed produced the universal germ (Hiranyagarbha), from which everything else appeared.

In the Babylonian creation story Enûma Eliš the universe was in a formless state and is described as a watery chaos. From it emerged two primary gods, the male Apsu and female Tiamat, and a third deity who is the maker Mummu and his power for the progression of cosmogonic births to begin.

Norse mythology also describes Ginnungagap as the primordial abyss from which sprang the first living creatures, including the giant Ymir whose body eventually became the world, whose blood became the seas, and so on; another version describes the origin of the world as a result of the fiery and cold parts of Hel colliding.

== Editions ==
=== Selected translations ===
- Athanassakis, Apostolos N., Theogony; Works and days; Shield / Hesiod; introduction, translation, and notes, Baltimore: Johns Hopkins University Press, 1983. ISBN 0-8018-2998-4.
- Cook, Thomas, The Works of Hesiod, 1728.
- Frazer, Richard McIlwaine, The Poems of Hesiod, Norman: University of Oklahoma Press, 1983. ISBN 0-8061-1837-7.
- Most, Glenn, translator, Hesiod, 2 vols., Cambridge, Massachusetts: Loeb Classical Library, 2006–07.
- Schlegel, Catherine M., and Henry Weinfield, translators, Theogony and Works and Days, Ann Arbor, Michigan, 2006.
- Johnson, Kimberly, Theogony and Works and Days: A New Critical Edition, Northwestern University Press, 2017. ISBN 081013487X.

== See also ==
- Ancient literature
- Gigantomachy
- Theomachy
- Pherecydes of Syros
