= Eunomian =

Eunomian is an eponymous adjective that may refer to:

- Eunomia (goddess), a minor Greek goddess of law and legislation
- Eunomius of Cyzicus (died c. 393), one of the leaders of the extreme or "anomoean" Arians
  - Eumonians, the followers of Eunomius (see Anomoeanism)
- The Eunomia family, a large grouping of S-type asteroids named after the Greek goddess Eunomia
