= Sybridae =

Sybridae or Sybridai (Ancient Greek: Συβρίδαι) was a deme of ancient Attica, of the phyle of Erechtheis, sending one delegate every two years, to the Athenian Boule, with Pambotadae sending its delegate in lieu of Sybridae in intervening years.

Its site is unlocated, although Pliny the Elder mentions a river Siberus.

== People ==
- Cephisodotus the Elder, sculptor
