= Horkos =

Personification in Greek mythology

In Greek mythology, Horkos (/ˈhɔːrkɒs/; Ancient Greek: Ὅρκος [hór.kos], lit. 'Oath') personifies the curse that is inflicted on any person who swears a false oath. According to Hesiod, Horkos was the son of Eris (Strife). He is one of the divine enforcers of oaths, which were an important part of the ancient Greek system of justice.

== Family ==
According to Hesiod's Theogony, Horkos was the son of Eris (Strife), attended at birth by the Erinyes (Furies), with no father mentioned. Like all the children of Eris, Horkos is a personification of an abstract concept, and represents one of the many harms which might be thought to result from discord and strife. The tragic playwright Sophocles has Horkos as the son of Zeus, appropriately since Zeus Horkios was the guarantor of oaths. Compare with Hyginus which has Iusiurandum (Oath) as the offspring of Aether and Terra (Earth). According to Herodotus, Horkos was said to have a "nameless" son with neither hands nor feet.

== Function ==
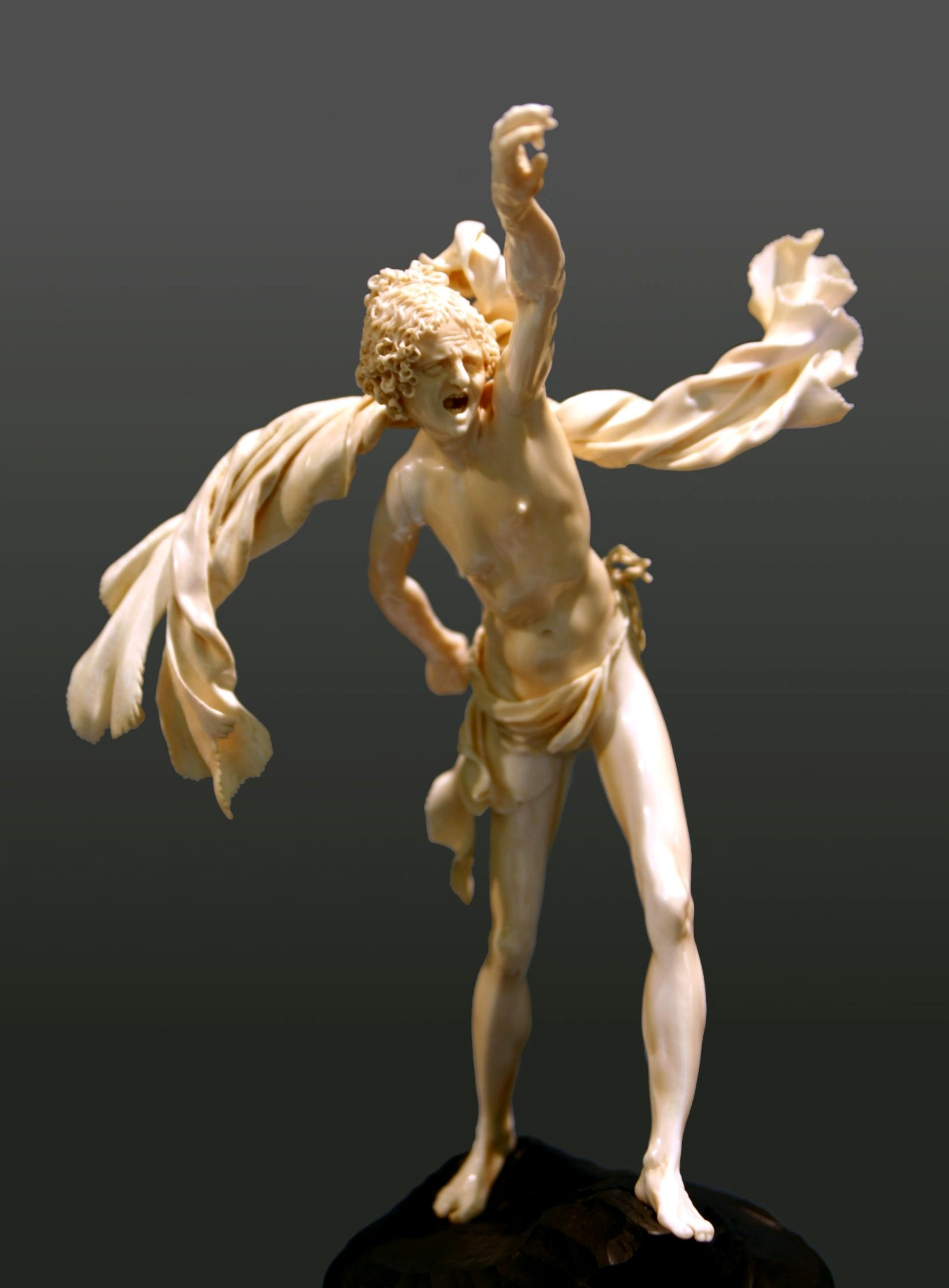
A 1610 depiction of a Fury from the Kunsthistorisches Museum

Horkos is the divine personification of, and fulfiller of, a particular kind of curse. That curse is the one a person makes against themselves, when swearing an oath, which takes effect if the oath is foresworn. According to Hesiod, the Erinyes assisted in Horkos' birth. Such an association is fitting, since the Erinyes were divine agents who fulfilled curses, including the conditional self-curse involved in oath taking, as personified by Horkos. Both the Erinyes and Horkos were divine punishers of oath-breaking or perjury.

Such punishments could extend beyond just the oath-breakers themselves to their offspring. According to Herodotus, the Spartan king Leotychidas claimed that Horkos (through a nameless son) would punish those who foreswore an oath, or even considered doing so, by destroying all a man's family and household. Even though these punishments might take place over generations, and so occur slowly over time, Horkos and his son are also presented as acting quickly. Hesiod has Horkos "run" to exact his retribution, while the story related by Herodotus has Horkos' son, though lacking hands and feet, pursue oath-breakers "swiftly".

Horkos is invoked by name in Sophocles' Oedipus at Colonus, and possibly also by Pindar in one of his victory odes. Horkos functions within the sphere of Zeus' daughter Dike (Justice), thus Horkos will punish those who mistreat Dike, just as Dike herself will bring "evil to the human beings who drive her out and do not deal straight." Martin West likens Horkos' role in the realm of men, with the role of Styx, by whom the gods swear their oaths, in the realm of the gods.

== Sources ==
=== Hesiod ===
Hesiod (fl. c. 700 BC), in his Theogony, has Horkos as one of the many harmful offspring of Eris (Strife):

And loathsome Strife bore painful Toil and Forgetfulness and Hunger and tearful Pains, ... and Oath [Horkos], who indeed brings most woe upon human beings on the earth, whenever someone willfully swears a false oath.

— Hesiod, Theogony 226–232; translation by Glenn Most

In his Works and Days he says that the Erinyes (Furies) assisted at the birth of Horkos, and warns that the "fifth days" of each month are especially dangerous as Horkos was born on the "fifth":

Avoid the fifth days, since they are difficult and dread: for they say that it was on the fifth that the Erinyes attended upon Oath [Horkos] as it was born—Oath, which Strife [Eris] bore as a woe to those who break their oath.

— Hesiod, Works and Days 802–804; translation by Glenn Most

In another Works and Days passage, Hesiod describes Horkos assisting Justice (Dike), running:

along beside crooked judgments, and there is a clamor when Justice is dragged where men, gift-eaters, carry her off and pronounce verdicts with crooked judgments; but she stays, weeping, with the city and the people’s abodes, clad in invisibility, bearing evil to the human beings who drive her out and do not deal straight.

— Hesiod, Works and Days, 219–224; translation by Glenn Most

=== Herodotus ===
The fifth-century BC Greek historian Herodotus relates a story told by the Spartan king Leotychidas to the Athenians, during the Peloponnesian War in 490 BC. It concerned a would-be oath-breaker Glaucus who had asked the Delphic oracle's advice about dishonouring an oath he had made concerning the return of a deposit of money, and the oracle answered that he would profit for the moment if he kept the money, but that it would bring about the destruction of him and his heirs, saying:

But Oath [Horkos] has a son, nameless; he is without hands

Or feet, but he pursues swiftly, until he catches

And destroys all the family and the entire house.

— Herodotus, 6.86C.2; translation by A. D. Godley

When Glaucus heard this, he asked the god to pardon him for having even considered dishonouring his oath. But the oracle answered "that to tempt the god and to do the deed had the same effect".

=== Aesop's fable ===
A story, similar to the one related by Herodotus, is told in one of Aesop's Fables (number 239 in the Perry Index). Here, in contrast to Hesiod's warning about the fifth day of the month, there is no fixed day on which the god's punishment falls on the wicked. The fable concerns a man who had taken a deposit from a friend and, when reminded of his oath to return it, left the town hurriedly. A lame man whom he met told his fellow-traveller that he was Horkos on his way to track down wicked people. The man asked Horkos how often he returned to the city they were leaving. "Forty years, sometimes thirty," Horkos replied. Believing himself to be free from danger, the man returned the following morning and swore that he had never received the deposit. Almost immediately, Horkos arrived to execute the perjurer by throwing him off a cliff. Protesting, the man asked why the god had said he was not coming back for years when in fact he did not grant even a day's reprieve. Horkos replied, "I assure you", said the god, "that when anyone offends me exceedingly it is my custom to visit him on the very same day".

== Oaths ==
Such stories involving Horkos exemplify the importance of oath-taking in ancient Greece, which was undertaken in the name of the gods. To perjure oneself meant waging war on the gods, who even themselves could suffer under the same sanctions. In taking an oath one called down a conditional curse on oneself, to take effect if one lied or broke one's promise. The lasting nature of this curse, and the corresponding benefit of honouring one's word, is also emphasised by Hesiod in discussing the matter:

Whoever willfully swears a false oath, telling a lie in his testimony, he himself is incurably hurt at the same time as he harms Justice [Dike], and in after times his family is left more obscure; whereas the family of the man who keeps his oath is better in after times.

— Hesiod, Works and Days 282–285; translation by Glenn Most

There was a frightening image of Zeus Horkios at Olympia, where athletes, who were to compete in the Olympic Games, swore an oath, along with their family and trainers, to uphold the honesty of the competition, whose purpose was to strike fear in those who might foreswear their oaths. According to Walter Burkert, "only fear of the gods provides a guarantee that oaths will be kept."

== See also ==
- Erinyes – Chthonic female deities of vengeance in Greek mythology
- Styx – Goddess and river in Greek mythology
