= Themis =

Greek goddess of divine law

- Goddess of justice, divine law, divine order, custom, assemblies, and oracles
- Member of the Titans
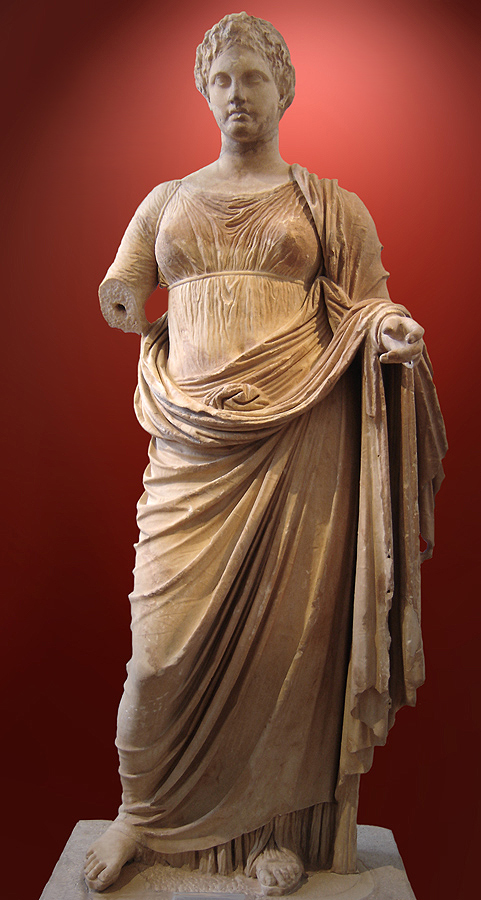
- Themis of Rhamnous, Attica, by the sculptor Chairestratos, c. 280 BCE
- Ancient Greek: Θέμις
- Abode: Mount Olympus

Genealogy
- Parents: Uranus and Gaia
- Spouse: Zeus
- Offspring: Horae: Dike; Eirene; Eunomia; Moirai: Clotho; Lachesis; Atropos

In Greek mythology and religion, Themis (/ˈθiːmɪs/; Ancient Greek: Θέμις, romanized: Themis, lit. 'justice, law, custom') is the goddess and personification of justice, divine order, law, and custom. She is one of the twelve Titan children of Gaia and Uranus, and the second wife of Zeus. She is associated with oracles and prophecies, including the Oracle of Delphi.

== Name ==
Themis means "divine law" rather than human ordinance, literally "that which is put in place", from the Greek verb títhēmi (τίθημι), meaning "to put."

To the ancient Greeks she was originally the organizer of the "communal affairs of humans, particularly assemblies." Moses Finley remarked of themis, as the word was used by Homer in the 8th century BCE, to evoke the social order of the 10th- and 9th-century Greek Dark Ages:

Themis is untranslatable. A gift of the gods and a mark of civilized existence, sometimes it means right custom, proper procedure, social order, and sometimes merely the will of the gods (as revealed by an omen, for example) with little of the idea of right.

Finley adds, "There was themis—custom, tradition, folk-ways, mores, whatever we may call it, the enormous power of 'it is (or is not) done'."

In the Hymn to Apollo, Themis is referred to as "Ichnaea", meaning "Tracker".

== Description ==
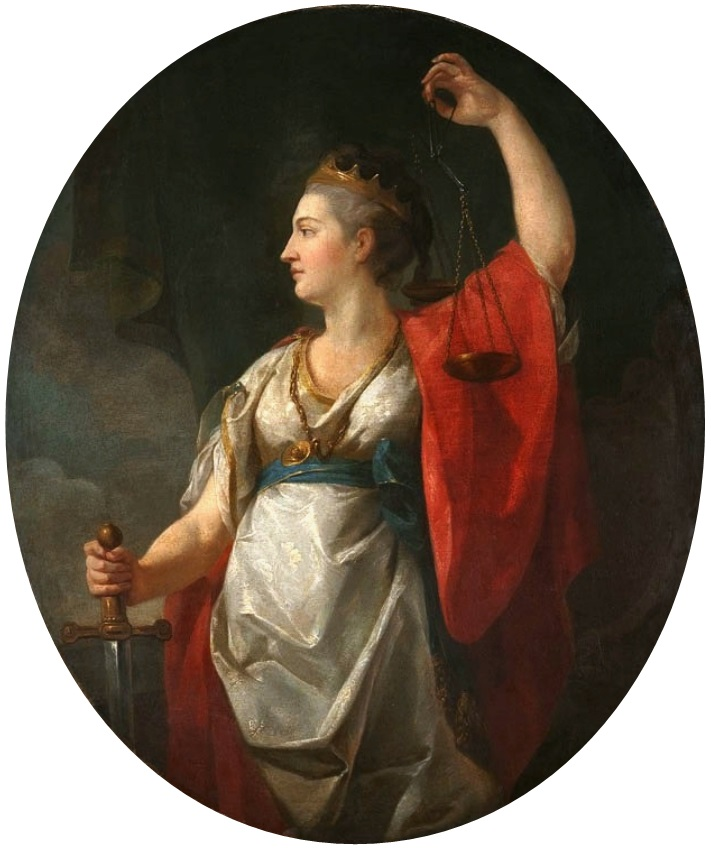
Painting of Themis with scales and sword by Marcello Bacciarelli

Some classical descriptions of Themis describe a sober-looking woman holding scales. Themis is an earth goddess much like her mother, Gaia, and in some stories it is hard to tell the two apart. Some classical depictions of Themis show her holding a sword.

When Themis is disregarded, Nemesis brings just and wrathful retribution; thus Themis shared the small temple at Rhamnous with Nemesis. Themis is not wrathful; when a distraught Hera returned to Olympus after quarrelling with Zeus, Themis, "of the lovely cheeks," was the first to offer her a cup.

Themis presided over the proper relation between man and woman, the basis of the rightly ordered family (the family was seen as the pillar of the deme). Judges were often referred to as "themistopóloi" (the servants of Themis). Such was also the basis for order upon Olympus. Even Hera addressed her as "Lady Themis".

=== Hesiod ===
Themis occurred in Hesiod's Theogony as the first recorded appearance of Justice as a divine personage. Drawing not only on the socio-religious consciousness of his time but also on many of the earlier cult-religions, Hesiod described the forces of the universe as cosmic divinities. Hesiod portrayed temporal justice, Dike, as the daughter of Zeus and Themis. Dike executed the law of judgments and sentencing and, together with her mother Themis, she carried out the final decisions of the Moirai.

=== Aeschylus ===
In the play Prometheus Bound, traditionally attributed to Aeschylus, it is said by Prometheus that Themis is called many names, including Gaia.

=== Euripides ===
In Medea by Euripides, Themis is said to be the daughter of Zeus and the "keeper of men's oaths."

== Family ==
In Hesiod's Theogony, Themis is one of the twelve Titan children of Gaia (Earth) and Uranus (Sky). She is the second wife of her nephew Zeus, by whom she is the mother of the Horae (Seasons), listed as Eunomia (Law), Dike (Justice), Eirene (Peace), and the Moirai (Fates), listed as Clotho, Lachesis and Atropos. Similarly to Hesiod's account, the Orphic Hymn to Themis calls her the daughter of Gaia and Uranus, and the Orphic Hymn to the Seasons and Recognitiones calls her the mother, by Zeus, of the Horae.

Hyginus, in his Fabulae, makes Themis the daughter of Aether and Terra (Earth), and by Zeus the mother of the Horae. In the play Prometheus Bound, traditionally attributed to Aeschylus, Themis is the mother of Prometheus, while according to a scholion on Euripides's play Hippolytus, Themis is mother of the Hesperides by Zeus.

== Mythology ==
Themis built the Oracle at Delphi and was herself oracular. According to another legend, Themis received the Oracle at Delphi from Gaia and later gave it to Phoebe, who gave it to her grandson Apollo as a birthday gift. According to Ephorus, Themis helped Apollo find the oracle, with the intent of helping mankind. Some examples of Themis's visions; In the story of Dryope in Ovid's Metamorphoses, Themis warns the gods of an oncoming civil war in Thebes. In another tale she warns Zeus and Poseidon to not marry Thetis because her son will be more powerful than his father. According to Ovid, it was Themis rather than Zeus who told Deucalion to throw the bones of "his Mother" over his shoulder to create a new race of humankind after the deluge. Also according to Ovid, Themis prophesied that a son of Zeus will steal golden apples from the orchard of Atlas.

In Homer's Iliad she is tasked with calling the gods to council on Olympus by Zeus.

Themis was present at Delos to witness the birth of Apollo, and nursed him with nectar and ambrosia. In his De astronomia, Hyginus lists Themis, in addition to the nymph Amalthea, as the foster-mother and nurse of the young Zeus. In a fragment of Pindar, Themis was brought from the springs of Oceanus by the Moirai (in this version not her daughters) to Olympus, where she became the first wife of Zeus (rather than the second), and by him the mother of the Horae.

According to the lost Cypria by Stasinus of Cyprus, Themis and Zeus together plotted the start of the Trojan War. According to Quintus Smyrnaeus, when the gods defied the orders of Zeus and started fighting each other after the creation of the Trojan Horse, Themis stopped them by warning them of Zeus's wrath.

In the Orphic "Rhapsodic Theogony", or Rhapsodies, (first century BC/AD) Nyx (Night) prophesied that Themis would remain a virgin until Rhea gave birth to a child of Cronus.

Themis also played a role in Eros, the young god of love, growing up; according to Porphyry, his mother Aphrodite was worried about her son, Eros, staying a child forever and brought him to Themis. Themis told her to give Eros a brother, as he wasn't growing because of his solitude. Aphrodite then gave birth to another love god, Anteros (meaning "counter-love"), and Eros grew whenever he was near him. But every time Anteros was away, Eros shrank back to his previous, small form.

When four Cretan men (Aegolius, Celeus, Cerberus and Laius) broke into the sacred cavern in Crete where Rhea had given birth to Zeus in order to steal some of the honey produced there by the sacred bees, Themis and her daughters the Fates convinced Zeus against killing them inside the holy cave, as they considered it impious for anyone to die in the cave, so instead he turned all four into different birds.

== Cult ==
Themis had several temples in Greece, though they are not described in any great detail by ancient authors. She had temples at the oracular shrine of Zeus at Dodona, at Tanagra, in Athens nearby to the Acropolis, a temple in Rhamnous beside one of Nemesis, and a Temple of Themis Ikhnaia in Phthiotis, Thessalia. Pausanias describes her sanctuary in Thebes in somewhat more detail than what was normally the case and it may therefore have been of more importance:

Along the road from the Neistan gate [at Thebes, Boiotia] are three sanctuaries. There is a sanctuary of Themis, with an image of white marble; adjoining it is a sanctuary of the Moirai (Moirae, Fates) [her daughters], while the third is of Zeus Agoraios (of the Market.)

Themis also had an altar in Olympia: "On what is called the Stomion (Mouth) the altar to Themis has been built." Themis was sometimes depicted in the sanctuaries of other gods and may have shared temples with them occasionally, and she is mentioned to have shared a temple with Aphrodite in Epidauros: "Within the grove [of the sanctuary of Asklepios (Asclepius) at Epidauros] are a temple of Artemis, an image of Epione, a sanctuary of Aphrodite and Themis, a race-course."

The temple of Themis in Athens is found west of the theater of Dionysus. Themis's temple in Dodona is tetrastyle pronaos in antis with a cella, an entrance on the northside and outside was a large altar. The temple columns in Dodona were Ionic made out of local sandstone.

== Modern depictions and dedications ==
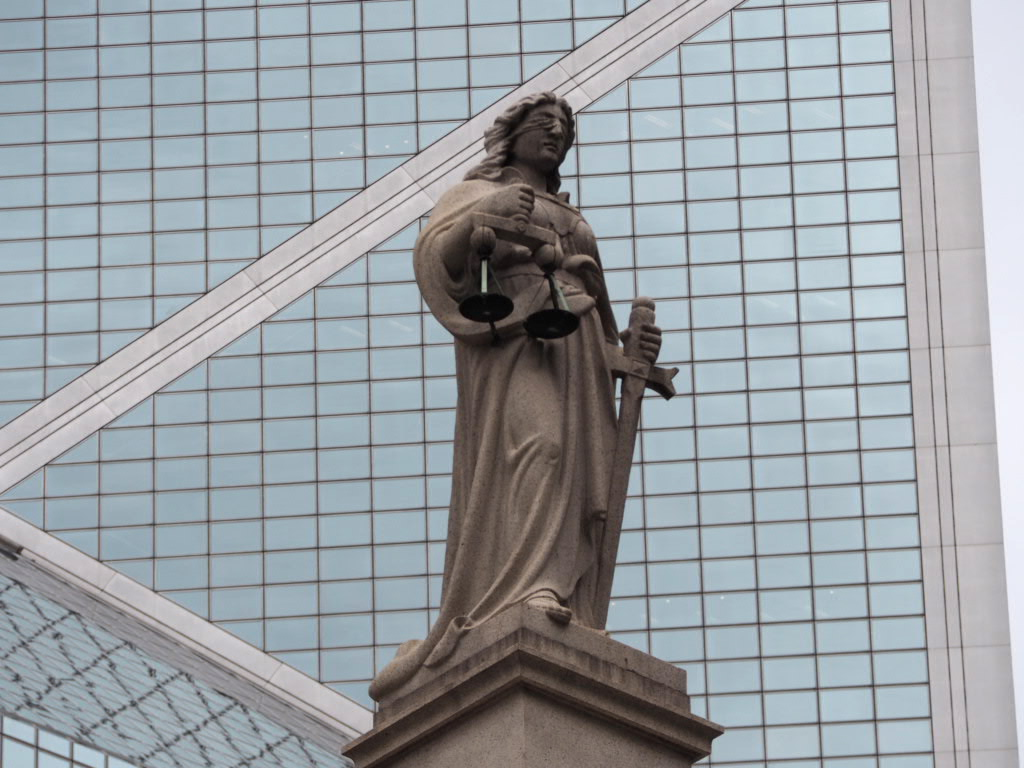
A modern statue in Hong Kong showing Themis with her eyes covered.

Themis in modern-day depictions is often called "Lady Justice" and statues can be found outside many courthouses.

In 2022, the building hosting the main courtroom of the Court of Justice of the European Union's General Court was renamed The Themis Building.

== Genealogy ==
Themis's family tree

Uranus	Gaia	Pontus
Oceanus	Tethys	Hyperion	Theia	Crius	Eurybia
The Rivers	The Oceanids	Helios	Selene	Eos	Astraeus	Pallas	Perses
Cronus	Rhea	Coeus	Phoebe
Hestia	Hera	Hades	Zeus	Leto	Asteria
Demeter	Poseidon
Iapetus	Clymene (or Asia)	Mnemosyne	(Zeus)	THEMIS
Atlas	Menoetius	Prometheus	Epimetheus	The Muses
Eunomia	Dike	Eirene	Clotho	Lachesis	Atropos
The Horae	The Moirai

== See also ==
- Adikia – Goddess of injustice
- Adrestia – Greek nymph
- Dharma – Key concept in Indian philosophy and Eastern religions, with multiple meanings
- Lady Justice – Personification of justice
- Libra – Seventh astrological sign of the zodiac
- Ma'at – Egyptian deity and concepts of truth, order and justice
- Me – Sumerian name given to the laws of the gods
- Raguel – Angel of justice in some Christian traditions
