= Pax (goddess) =

Roman goddess of peace

- Goddess of Peace
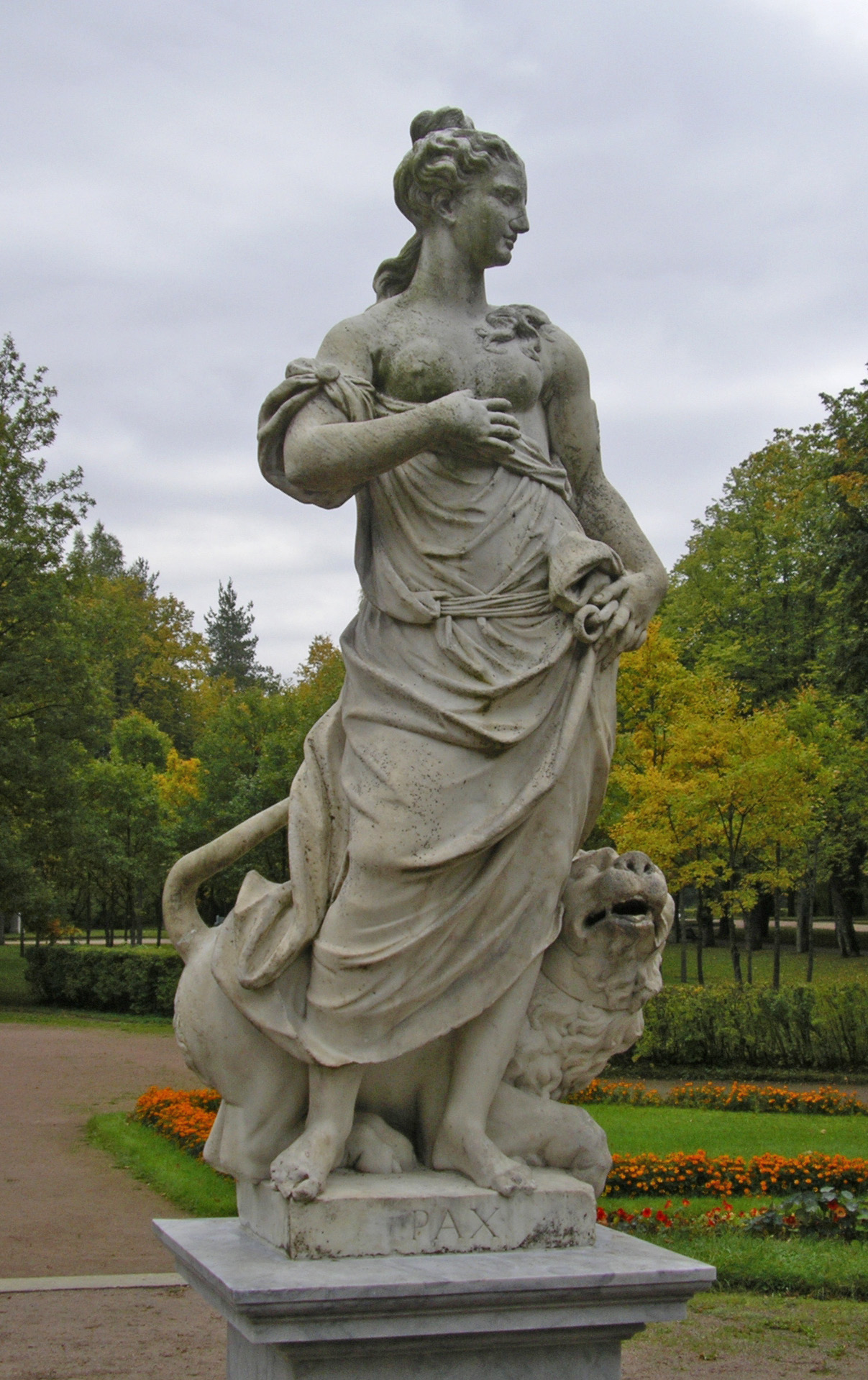
- Statue of Peace in the garden of Pavlovsk Palace, Saint Petersburg
- Abode: Rome
- Symbol: Caduceus, Cornucopia, Corn, Olive branches, Scepter
- Parents: Jupiter and Justice

Equivalents
- Greek: Eirene

Pax (Latin for Peace), more commonly known in English as Peace, was the Roman goddess of peace derived and adopted from the ancient Greek equivalent Eirene. Pax was seen as the daughter of the Roman king god Jupiter and the goddess Justice. Worship of Peace was organized and made popular during the rule of the emperor Augustus who used her imagery to help stabilise the empire after the years of turmoil and civil war of the late republic. Augustus commissioned an altar of peace in her honour on the Campus Martius called Ara Pacis, and the emperor Vespasian built a temple for her on called the Templum Pacis. Pax had a festival held for her on January 30. In art she is commonly depicted holding out olive branches as a peace offering, as well as a caduceus, cornucopia, corn and a sceptre. Pax is also often associated with spring.

== History of Worship ==
=== Early depictions and Greek influence ===
Early Roman worship and mythology was very much based on and adopted from the Greek pantheon of gods and goddesses. Ancient Greek deities that aligned with the Roman values of conquest, strength and pragmatism such as Mars and Juno were adopted early on during the Roman kingdom and early republic.

Pax was a relatively unrecognised deity during the early republic as she had little to do with the Roman philosophy. However, during this time the Greek city states had been worshipping Pax’s equivalent - Eirene since the early bronze age where the worship of her peaked during the rise of the Athenian empire and the Peloponnesian war.

As Weinstock explained the Roman idea and word for peace (pax) derived from ‘pacisci’ was seen as more of a pact which concluded a war and led to a surrender or alliance with another faction rather than today’s notion of peace as the lack of war. Peace was seen as the submission to Roman superiority; it was the outcome of war, not its absence. Conquest led to pacification.

=== Pax Romana and early empire ===
Pax worship peaked during Augustus Caesar’s reign and the early empire. Augustus introduced Pax as a way to stabilise his reign and to signal to the populace that the previous years of civil war and turmoil that was linked to the decay and fall of the republic had ended and that his reign had bought peace and direction to the ravaged empire. Pax first appeared like Eirene with the caduceus and this can be seen in Augustus’ commission of the Ara Pacis or altar of peace and in coinage at the time. Some argue that Pax could have therefore been used more of a political slogan than an actual goddess at the time, a pact to cease the civil war and to bring prosperity back to the empire through the new imperial system.

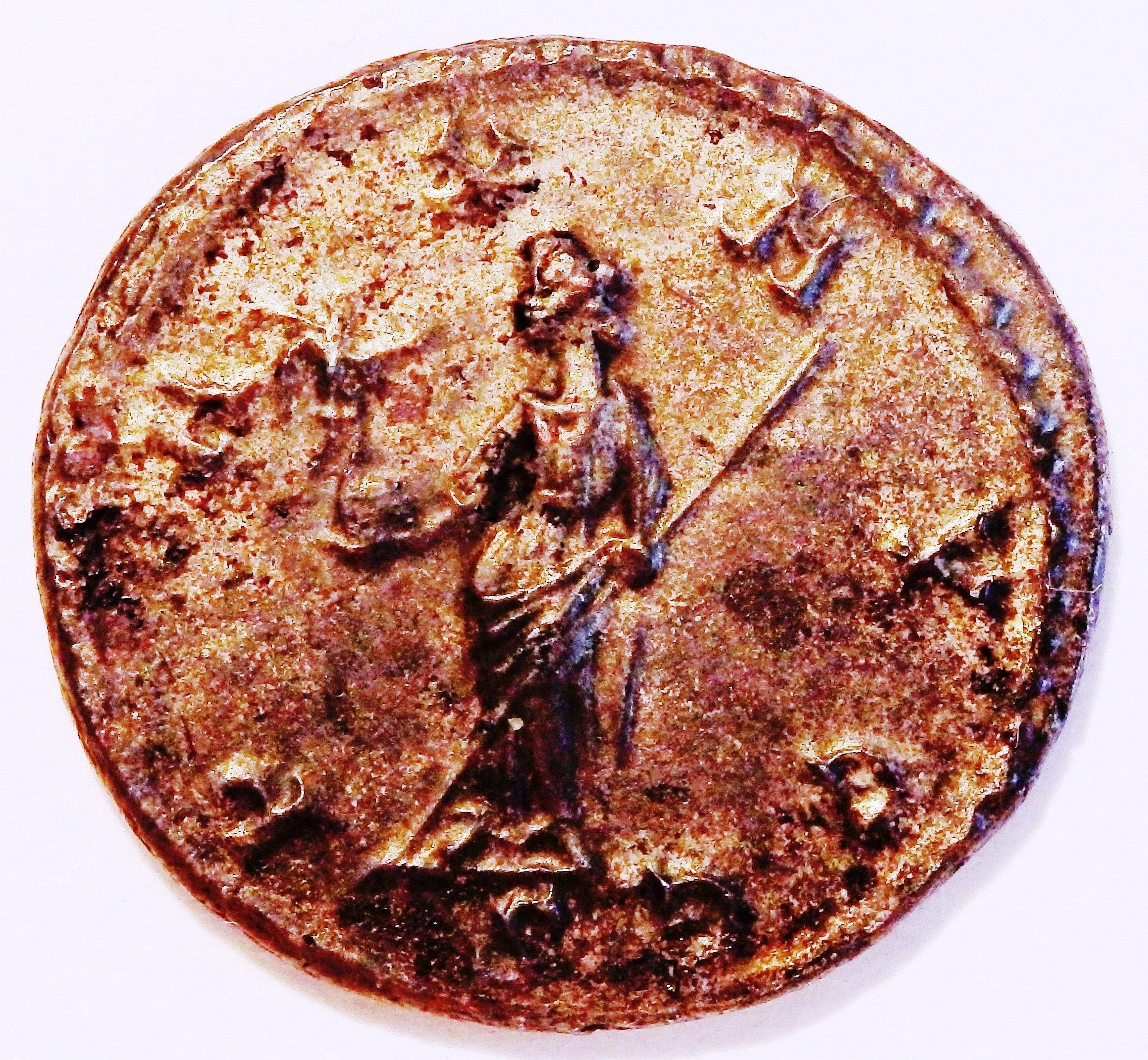
Pax on back of an Antoninianus of Emperor Maximian

Augustus often used religious events and expressions to stress his political messages such as when he became Pontifex Maximus. His construction of the Ara Pacis symbolised peace for the Roman citizens under his rule and some colonies were renamed after the goddess and Augustus such as Pax Julia to Pax Augusta in ancient Lusitania, also coinage was circulated in the colonies supporting Augustus as the bringer of peace where his bust in shown and the goddess Pax on the obverse side. Augustus attempted to establish a cult of Pax in the provinces such as in Spain and Gaul like what he did with the imperial cult. Augustus’s reign emphasised the notion of peace to Roman citizens and recently subjugated peoples as a possible way to bring solidarity to the early empire and to consolidate his political philosophy. The imperial message could’ve communicated that Roman subjects enjoyed the goddess Pax and her benefits only because of the imperium of Augustus and the strength of his armies.

The linking between emperor and Pax or her equivalent was not a new idea and had Greek origins with Alexander the Great and then with Pompey and Julius Caesar, in this time Pax was not seen as a powerful god like Jupiter but a ramification of the emperor’s strength and influence.

==== After Augustus ====
Augustus’ successors during the Julio-Claudian dynasty would continue to stress this notion, Pax’s image would slowly change around the reign of Claudius where she becomes more of a winged figure. Pax worship continued with Vespasian who established the Flavian dynasty and ended the civil war and instability of the Year of the Four Emperors. Vespasian constructed the Templum Pacis in AD 75 in her honour and continued linking the goddess Pax to the god Janus as seen in the construction of the temple Janus Quadrifrons near the Forum Pacis as the closing of the gates of Janus was seen as the conclusion of war and the start of peace, and was something that Augustus did in his first years as emperor.

Pax and peace would later become synonymous with Augustus in the period known as Pax Augusta and later scholars would refer to the time of peace as the Pax Romana, meaning that stability and peace was achieved through the power of the emperor to limit infighting within the empire and through defeating foreign threats such as seen as the subjugation of Germania, Pannonia, and Egypt etc.

=== Decline of worship and Christianity's effect ===
During the evolution of the Roman empire and the Pax Romana the conquered were integrated into society, slaves were freed, and the empire no longer had to be violent with its pacified people. Rebellions and piracy had diminished, and the empire had been consolidated and stabilised under Emperor Hadrian and the Nerva - Antonine dynasty. This led contemporary writers such as Plutarch to write “so far as peace is concerned the peoples have no need of statesmanship at present; for all war, both Greek and foreign, has been banished from among us and has disappeared”. Roman citizens were thus becoming less violent and less willing to serve in the empires’ legions and were becoming more submissive to imperial authority. This however was in antithesis with the Gods that their forefathers had worshipped and connected to their emperors and legionary armies and thus they became less relevant to the Roman zeitgeist. New spiritual leadership was increasingly being found in Christianity. The Pax Romana had an effect on the adoption and acceptance of Christianity’s peaceful teachings and less so was Pax the signifier of peace – she was being replaced by Jesus Christ. A church leader in the 4th century Eusebius wrote ‘it was not by mere human accident but of God's arrangement that the universal empire of peace came in time for the universal religion of peace.’ The Roman peace at the time however was still regularly sustained by violence, and raids into barbarian territories in Parthia and Germania were still necessary.

The Christian religion had an effect on the changing of the perception of the word 'peace' in the Roman world where in it was transformed into a demilitarised one more accustom to today’s description of peace. The fall of the Western Roman Empire and the barbarian invasions of the 4th and 5th centuries led to the complete collapse of Pax’s worship. While there were differences in Pax and Jesus, the concept of peace during the Pax Romana could’ve inspired part of the peaceful message seen within Christianity’s emphasis of peace and its connection with prosperity.

=== Artistic depictions of Pax ===
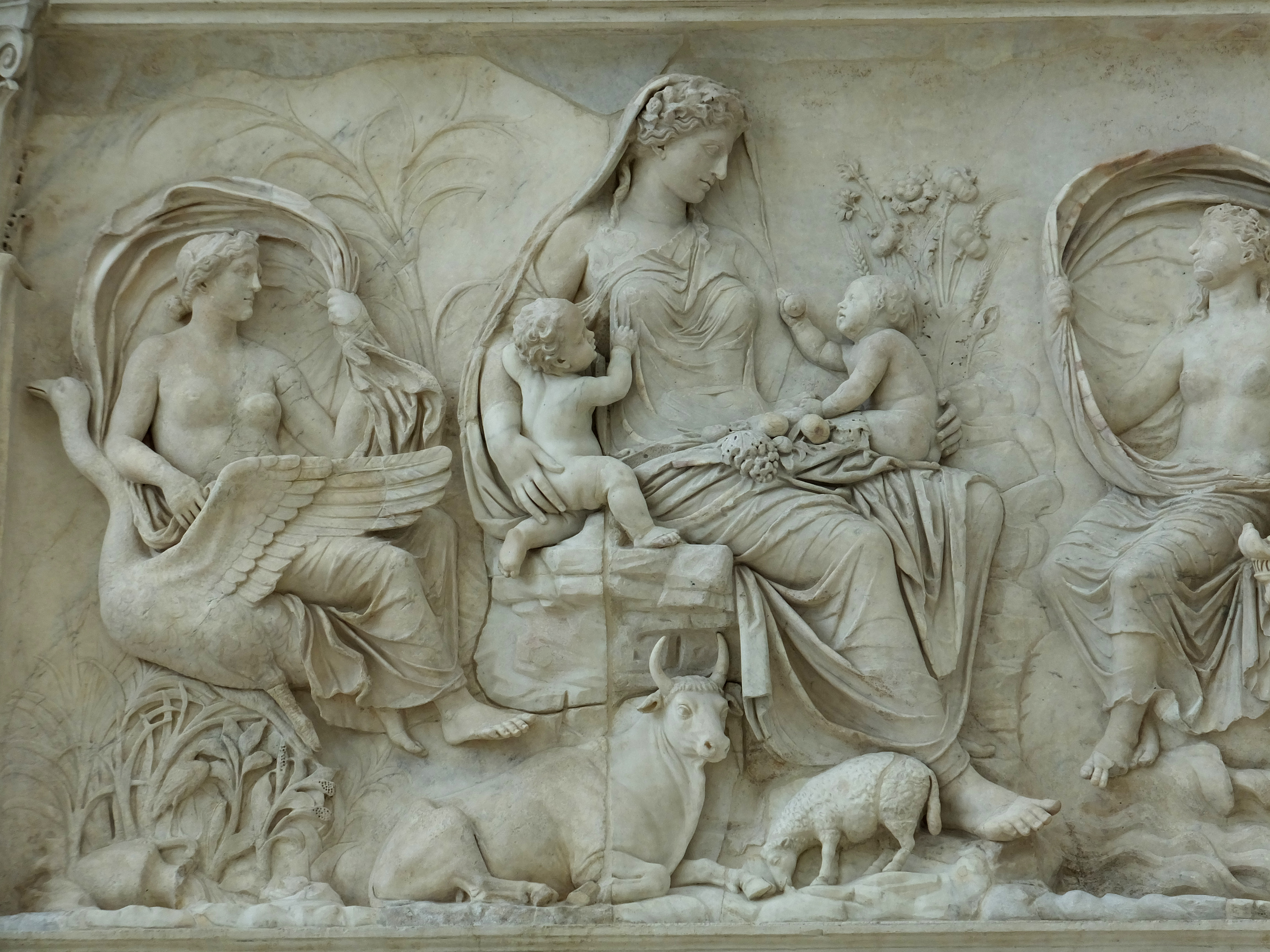
Depiction of Pax on the Ara Pacis.

Republic coins may have alluded to Pax before 44BC but in only using the goddesses future symbols and none specifically included Pax’s personification or called her by name until after 44BC. The first depictions of peace seen on coinage was depicted in denarii in 137BC which was circulated to recall a treaty between Rome and Epirus after the Samnite wars. On this a woman was surrounded with farm animals such as pigs and on the obverse side two soldiers face each other whilst holding a pig for sacrifice. In 49BC a minter known as Sicinus released a denarius with a laurel wreath, caduceus, and victory palm, maybe he did this to evoke the idea of domestic unity and the association of peace with prosperity. Pax under Augustus took her known form as he demonstrated that peace bought wealth, which was contradictory to the traditional Roman understanding that only war and conquest afforded wealth in the form of loot and plunder. Fruits and grains were incorporated into Pax’s image and this was maybe done to show the return and abundance of agriculture at the time, as many veterans during the empire where often settled onto farms - particularly after the civil wars. Pax was also shown with twins, maybe representing domestic harmony achieved through the Pax Romana. This was because fertility at home was spurred when the father of the household was around and not fighting in the legions. Cows, pigs and sheep imagery on the Ara Pacis showed the abundance of food and animal husbandry during the Pax Romana and these animals were also regularly scarified to Pax. Pax is also shown with a cornucopia to further emphasise the opulence and wealth during this Roman golden era. During the latter years of her worship she was very rarely shown holding the caduceus and she was increasingly shown sharing many more features common with Augustus - hinting at the Pax Augusta.

== See also ==
- Anthropomorphism
- Eirene
- Peace
- 679 Pax
