= Pambotadae =

Pambotadae or Pambotadai (Ancient Greek: Παμβωτάδαι) was a deme of ancient Attica, originally of the phyle of Erechtheis and after 127/8 AD the phyle of Hadrianis, sending one delegate every two years, to the Athenian Boule, with Sybridae sending its delegate in lieu of Pambotadae in intervening years until 307/6 BC, after which Pambotadae sent a delegate each year, and after 224/3 BC, two delegates each year.

Its site is unlocated.
