= Philotes =

Greek goddess of affection, friendship, and sex

In Greek mythology, Philotes (/ˈfɪlətiːz/; Ancient Greek: Φιλότης) was a minor goddess or spirit (daimones) personifying affection, friendship, and sexual intercourse.

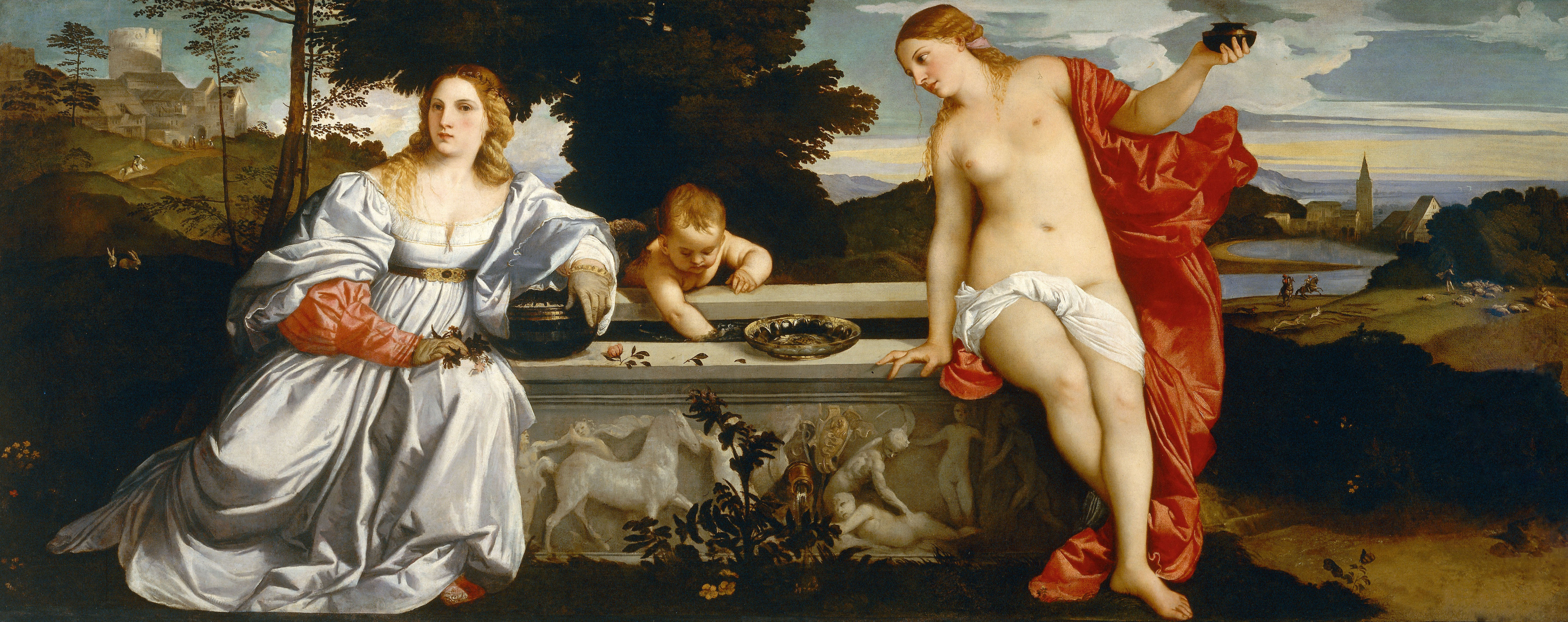
Sacred and Profane Love (1514–1515), by Titian, Borghese Gallery, Rome

This minor goddess also gave her name to a genus of butterflies native to North America, which contains a single species, Philotes sonorensis.

== Family ==
In Hesiod's Theogony, Philotes is described as one of the children of Nyx (Night). In later genealogies given by Roman authors, she is the offspring of Erebus (Darkness) and Nox (the Roman name for Nyx). Her siblings are said to be, among others, Apate (Deceit), Nemesis (Indignation), and Eris (Strife)

== Mythology ==
According to Hesiod's Theogony, she represented sexual and social intercourse. Her siblings are said to be, among others, Apate (Deceit) and Nemesis (Indignation). She was described by Empedocles as one of the driving forces behind creation, being paired together with Eris (Feuds); Philotes being the force behind good things and Eris being the force of bad things. He also identifies her with Kypris (Aphrodite) and mentions that Philotes feels hurt and offended by life-destroying offerings and demands the abstention from animal sacrifices.
