= Cephisodotus the Younger =

Greek sculptor of the 4th-century BC

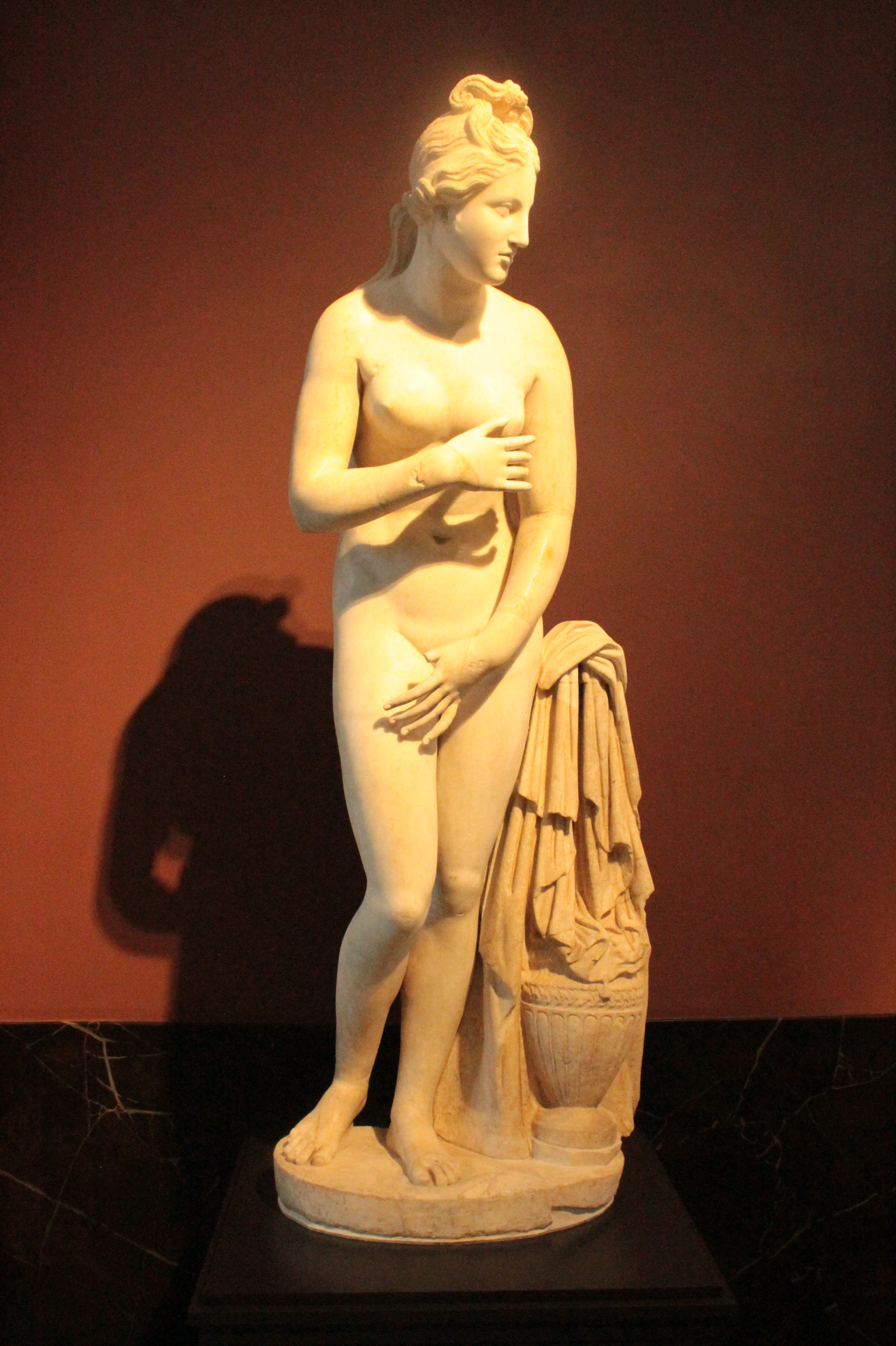
Aphrodite by Kephisodotos the Younger, copy made 160BC, Museum of Old Masters, Zwinger, Dresden

Cephisodotus, son of Praxiteles, brother of Timarchos and grandson of Cephisodotus the Elder. None of his work remains in originals, but in later, mostly Roman copies. He was in a team with his brother a prolific sculptor of the latter part of the 4th century BC, especially noted for portraits, of Menander (ca. 80 remaining ancient replices), of the orator Lycurgus, and others.

Cephisodotus the Younger is said by some to be a candidate for the famous statue of Two Wrestlers (at the Uffizi Gallery in Florence, Italy), found in a Roman marble but believed to have originally been cast in bronze.
