= Dysnomia (deity) =

Ancient Greek deity

In Greek mythology, Dysnomia (Ancient Greek: Δυσνομία, lit. 'Lawlessness, Bad Government, Anarchy') is the personification of lawlessness. According to Hesiod's Theogony, Dysnomia was the offspring of Eris (Strife), with no father mentioned. Like all of the children of Eris given by Hesiod, Dysnomia is a personified abstraction, allegorizing the meaning of their name, and representing one of the many harmful things which might be thought to result from discord and strife, with no other identity.

Hesiod associates Dysnomia with Ate (Recklessness). He names both as offspring of Eris, on the same line (230) of his Theogony, and says that the two are "much like one another".

== Solon ==
The Athenian statesman Solon contrasted Dysnomia with Eunomia, the personification of the ideal government:

This is what my heart bids me teach the Athenians, that Lawlessness [Dysnomia] brings the city countless ills, but Lawfulness [Eunomia] reveals all that is orderly and fitting, and often places fetters round the unjust.

Solon makes Dysnomia the cause of the "countless" evils besetting Athens: greed, the injustice of the city's leaders, the slavery of the poor, and civil war.

== Legacy ==
In 2005, Dysnomia was chosen as the name for the moon of the dwarf planet Eris.
