= Eirene (goddess) =

Ancient Greek goddess of peace

- Goddess of peace
- Member of the Horae
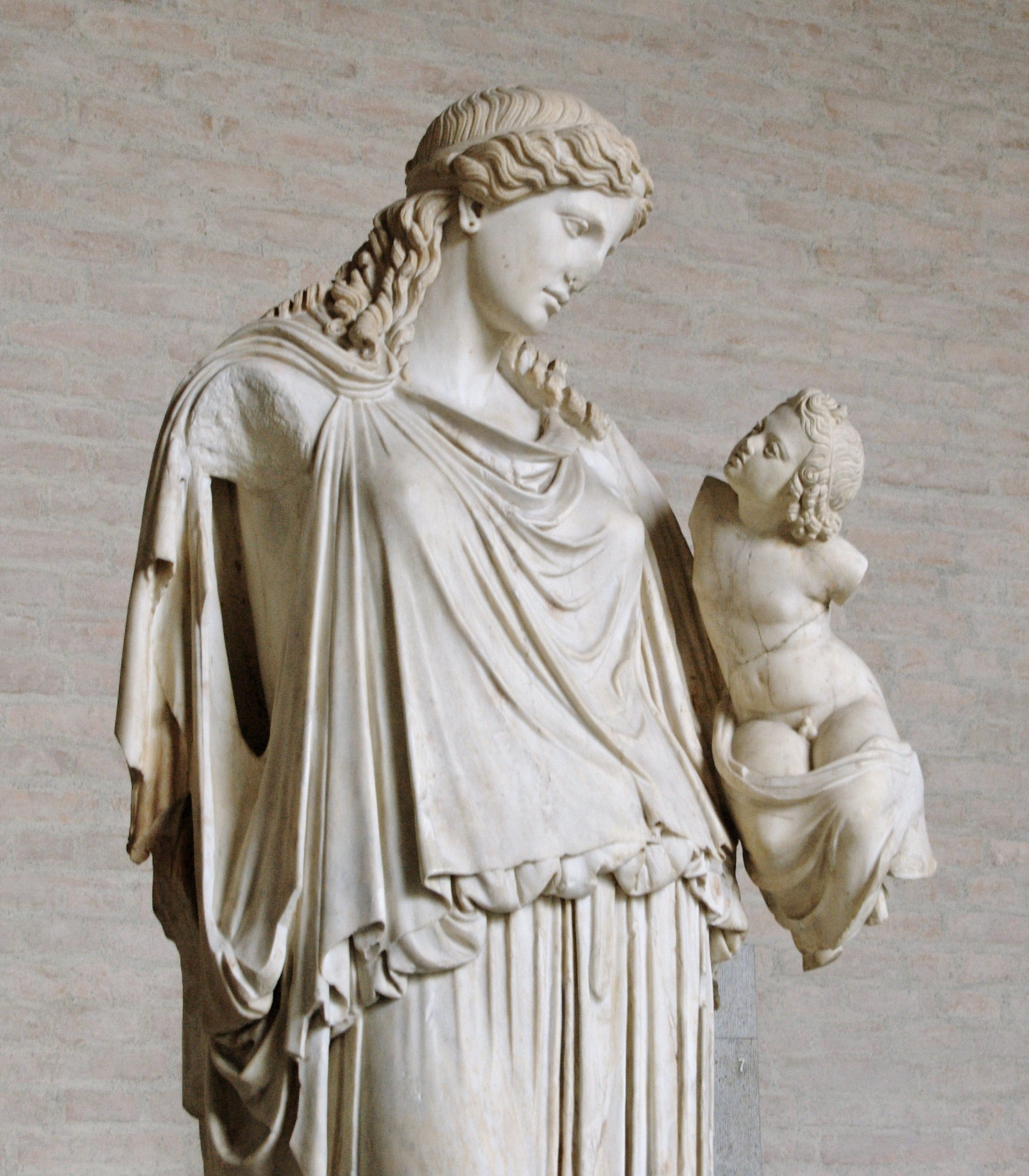
- Statue of Eirene with the infant Ploutos: Roman marble copy of bronze votive statue by Cephisodotus the Elder, now in the Glyptothek, Munich
- Symbol: cornucopia, sceptre, torch, rhyton

Genealogy
- Parents: Zeus and Themis
- Siblings: Eunomia, Dike, the Moirai, several paternal half-siblings

Eirene (/aɪˈriːniː/ or [ei̯ˈrɛːnɛː]; Ancient Greek: Εἰρήνη, romanized: Eirḗnē, lit. 'peace' ), more commonly known in English as Peace, is one of the Horae, the personification and goddess of peace in Greek mythology and ancient religion. She was depicted in art as a beautiful young woman carrying a cornucopia, sceptre, and a torch or rhyton. She is usually said to be the daughter of Zeus and Themis and thus sister of Dike and Eunomia. Pax was her Roman counterpart in Greek parts of the Roman Empire, and the two goddesses were identified during the imperial period. The given names Irene and Irenaeus, their forms in various languages, and the word 'irenic' all derive from Eirene.

== Cult ==
Eirene was particularly well regarded by the citizens of Athens. After a naval victory over Sparta in 375 BC, the Athenians established a cult for Peace, erecting altars to her. They held an annual state sacrifice to her after 371 BC to commemorate the Common Peace of that year and set up a votive statue in her honour in the Agora of Athens. The statue was executed in bronze by Cephisodotus the Elder, likely the father or uncle of the famous sculptor Praxiteles. It was acclaimed by the Athenians, who depicted it on vases and coins.

Although the statue is now lost, it was copied in marble by the Romans; one of the best surviving copies is in the Munich Glyptothek. It depicts the goddess carrying a child with her left arm—Ploutos, the god of plenty and son of Demeter, the goddess of agriculture. Peace's missing right hand once held a sceptre. She is shown gazing maternally at Ploutos, who is looking back at her trustingly. The statue is an allegory for Plenty (i.e., Ploutos) prospering under the protection of Peace; it constituted a public appeal to good sense. The copy in the Glyptothek was originally in the collection of the Villa Albani in Rome but was looted and taken to France by Napoleon. Following Napoleon's fall, the statue was bought by Ludwig I of Bavaria.
