= Cephisodotus the Elder =

4th-century BC Greek sculptor

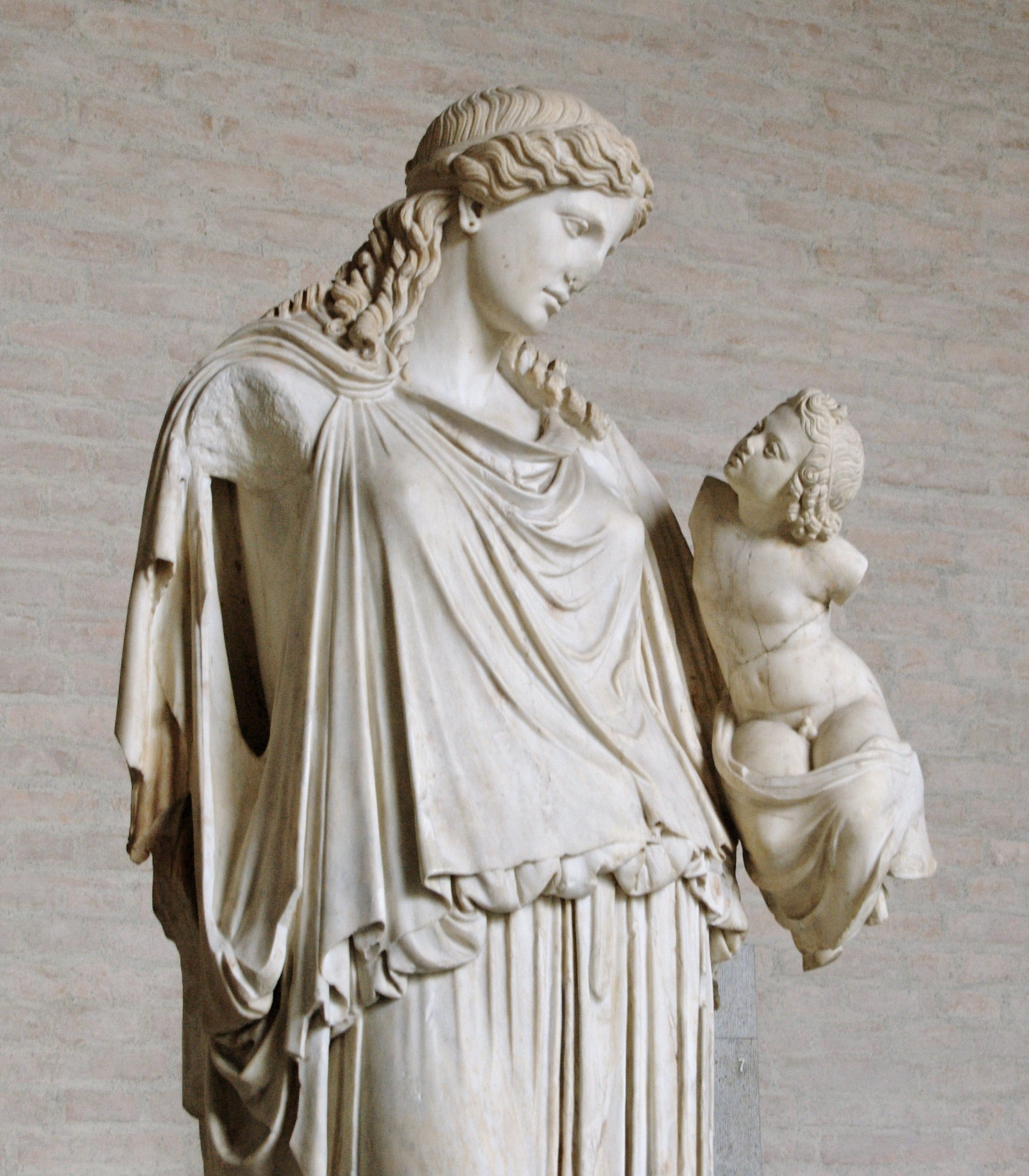
Roman copy of the Eirene (Glyptothek, Munich)

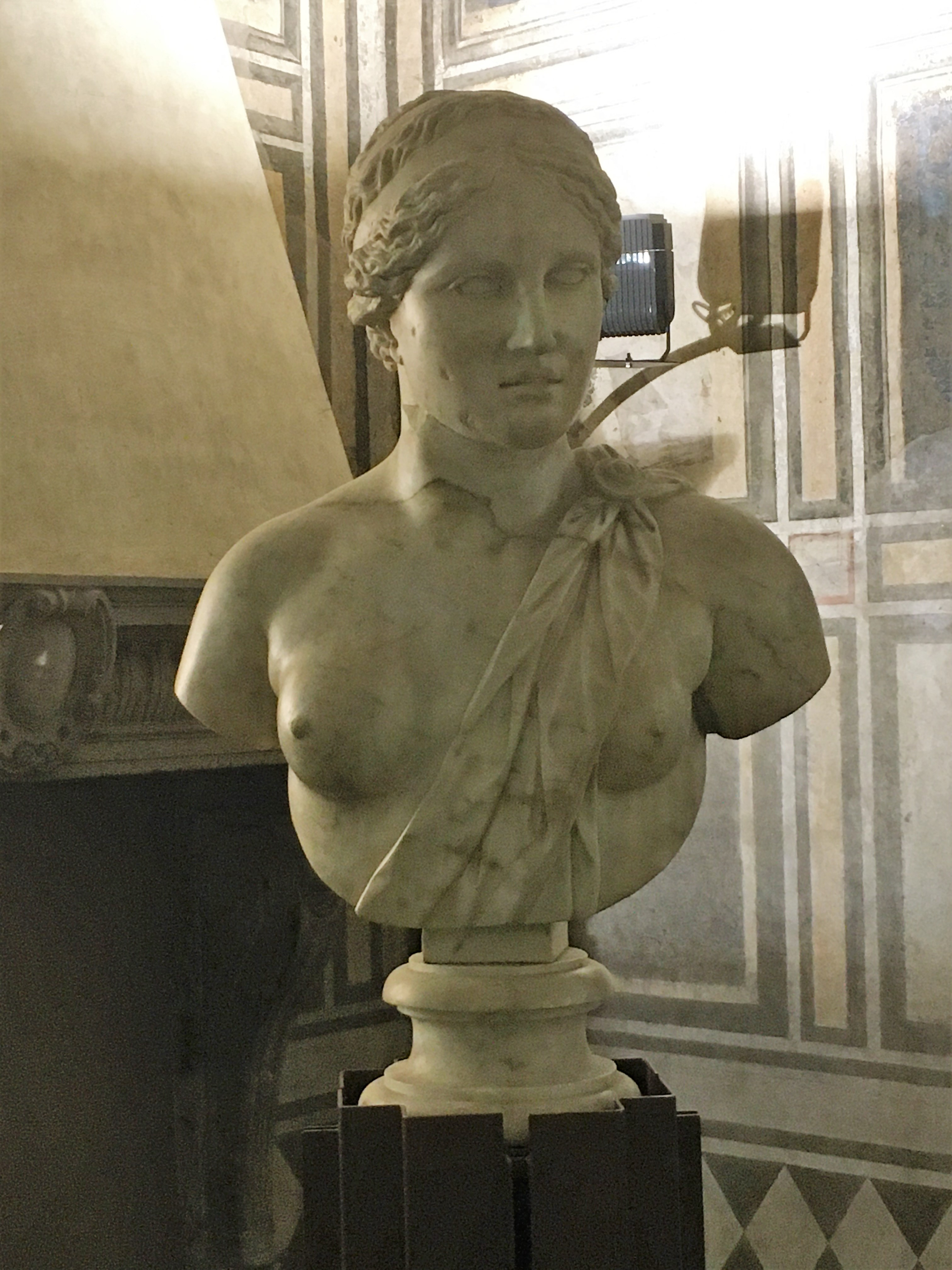
Bust of Artemis Soteira of Cephisodotus the Elder, Roman copy of the 1st-2nd century CE (Pavia City Museums, Italy)

Cephisodotus or Kephisodotos (Greek: Κηφισόδοτος, flourished c. 400 – c. 360 BC) was a Greek sculptor, perhaps the father or an uncle of Praxiteles, one of whose sculptor sons was Cephisodotus the Younger.

The one noted work of his was Eirene (Peace) bearing the infant Ploutos (Wealth), ca 380–370 BC, of which a Roman point copy exists at the Glyptothek, Munich, and fragments in various collections. The Eirene, commissioned by the city of Athens and set up on the Areopagus, was attributed to Cephisodotus by Pausanias in the 2nd century AD.

Cephisodotus also made, as did his son, a figure of Hermes carrying the child Dionysus, unless ancient critics have made two works of one. He sculpted certain statues for the city of Megalopolis, founded by Epaminondas in 369 BC; Pausanias noted them in its principal temple in the 2nd century AD.

Two heads long thought to be feminine and inserted in female busts, one formerly in the Lansdowne collection and the other in the Massarenti collection, Rome, now recognized to be of Apollo, were attributed to Cephisodotus by Dorothy Kent Hill in 1974.
