= Adikia =

Goddess of injustice

Dike strikes Adikia, 520 BC red-figure neck amphora in the Kunsthistorisches Museum, Austria

In Greek mythology, Adicia or Adikia (Ancient Greek: Ἀδικία, romanized: Adikia, lit. 'injustice') was the goddess and personification of injustice and wrong-doing.

== Representation ==
An image of Dike, the goddess of justice, overcoming Adikia appears in two archaic vase paintings. The scene was also shown on the chest of Cypselus, in which Adikia was portrayed as a hideous, barbaric woman covered in tattoos being dragged by Dike with one hand, while in the other she held a staff which she beat her with or she is depicted being throttled by Dike.

A beautiful woman is punishing an ugly one, choking her with one hand and with the other striking her with a staff. It is Justice (Dike) who thus treats Injustice (Adikia).

== Literature ==
She likely appeared in the now-lost Orphic Rhapsodies (a theogony attributed to Orpheus), in which she seems to have been the antithesis of Dike.
