= Dike (mythology) =

Ancient Greek goddess of justice

- Goddess of justice and the spirit of moral order and fair judgement
- Member of The Horae
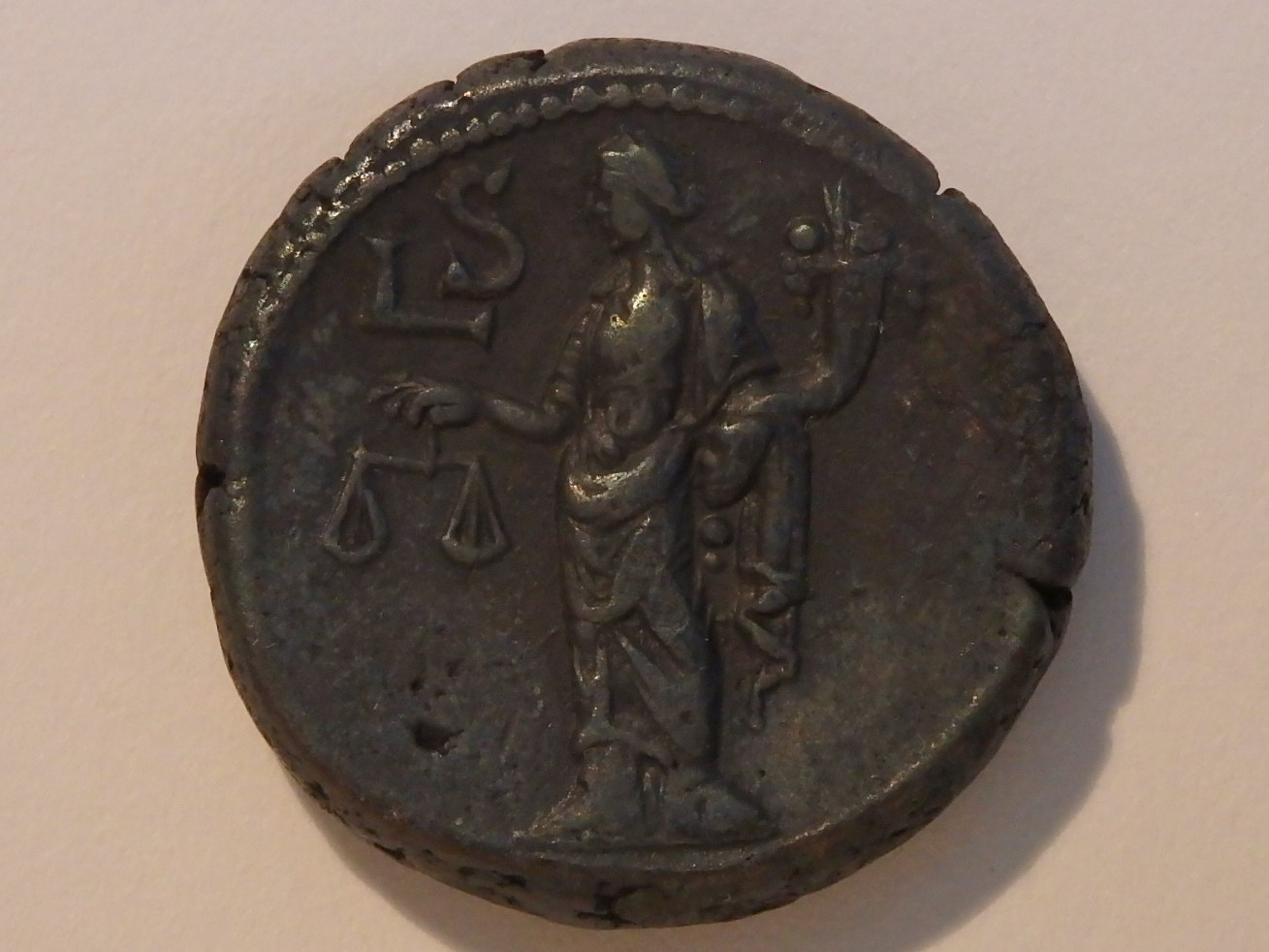
- Dikaiosyne (Greek: Δικαιοσύνη) on an Alexandrian tetradrachm of Severus Alexander, Year 6 (226/227 AD)
- Abode: Mount Olympus
- Symbol: Scales / Balance

Genealogy
- Parents: Zeus and Themis
- Siblings: Horae, Eirene, Eunomia, Moirai and several paternal half-siblings

In Greek mythology, Dike or Dice, (/ˈdaɪkiː/ or /ˈdaɪsiː/; Ancient Greek: Δίκη, romanized: Díkē, lit. 'justice, custom') sometimes also called Dicaeosyne (Ancient Greek: Δικαιοσύνη, romanized: Dikaiosúnē, lit. 'righteousness, justice'), is the goddess of justice and the spirit of moral order and fair judgement as a transcendent universal ideal or based on immemorial custom, in the sense of socially enforced norms and conventional rules. According to Hesiod (Theogony, l. 901), she was fathered by Zeus upon his second consort, Themis. She and her mother are both personifications of justice. She is depicted as a young, slender woman carrying a balance scale and wearing a laurel wreath. The constellation Libra (the Scales) was anciently thought to represent her distinctive symbol.

She is often associated with Astraea, the goddess of innocence and purity. Astraea is also one of her epithets, referring to her appearance in the nearby constellation Virgo which is said to represent Astraea. This reflects her symbolic association with Astraea, who, too, has a similar iconography.

== Depiction ==
The sculptures of the Temple of Zeus at Olympia have as their unifying iconographical conception the dikē of Zeus, and in poetry she is often the attendant (πάρεδρος, paredros) of Zeus. In the philosophical climate of late 5th century Athens, dikē could be anthropomorphised as a goddess of moral justice. She was one of the three second-generation Horae, along with Eunomia (Order) and Eirene (Peace):

For there dwells Order with her sister Justice, firm foundation for cities,
and Peace, steward of wealth for men, who was raised with them—
the golden daughters of wise-counseling Themis.

— Pindar, Olympian, 13.6–8; translation by William H. Race

She ruled over human justice, while her mother Themis ruled over divine justice. Her opposite was adikia ("injustice"); in reliefs on the archaic Chest of Cypselus preserved at Olympia, an attractive depiction of Dikē throttled an ugly depiction of Adikia and beat her with a stick.

The later art of rhetoric treated the personification of abstract concepts as an artistic device, which devolved into the allegorizing that Late Antiquity bequeathed to patristic literature. In a further euhemerist interpretation, Dikē was born a mortal and Zeus placed her on Earth to keep mankind just. He quickly learned that this was impossible and placed her next to him on Mount Olympus.

== Mythology ==
One of her epithets was Astraea, referring to her appearance as the constellation Virgo. According to Aratus's account of the constellation's origin, Dike lived upon Earth during the Golden and Silver ages, when there were no wars or diseases, men raised fine crops and did not yet know how to sail. They grew greedy, however, and Dike was sickened. She proclaimed:

Behold what manner of race the fathers of the Golden Age left behind them! Far meaner than themselves! but you will breed a viler progeny! Verily wars and cruel bloodshed shall be unto men and grievous woe shall be laid upon them.

— Aratus, Phaenomena 123

Dike left Earth for the sky, from which, as the constellation, she watched the despicable human race. After her departure, the human race declined into the Bronze Age, when diseases arose and humanity learned how to sail.

Another myth presents Dike as the avenger of Meletus, driven to suicide due to the rejection and torment he suffered at the hands of the youth Timagoras. Dike did not allow Timagoras to gloat after his suitor's fate, and as if compelled by divine forces, he threw himself from the same rock as Meletus and died.

== In the New Testament ==
The consensus of most biblical scholars is that the Acts of the Apostles contains a reference to Dike in its final chapter. In Acts 27 and 28, the Apostle Paul is conducted toward Rome under guard after having appealed his legal case to Caesar. After getting caught in a storm, having their boat ran aground, and narrowly escaping death while making it to shore, they discover they have landed on Malta, where they are cared for by the local populace. While helping to fuel the fire, Paul is bitten by snake, and the locals conclude, "No doubt this man is a murderer! Although he has escaped from the sea, Justice herself has not allowed him to live!" (NET). Ben Witherington III writes of this incident,

Pliny the Elder indicates it was a common belief, even among the educated, that all snakes were poisonous and that they were often agents of divine vengeance. This comports with what follows, where they are indeed depicted as "religious" in a primitive sense and see the snake as an agent of Justice. Perhaps the Maltans were familiar with some of the stories we now find in the Greek Anthology, for example, about a shipwrecked sailor who escapes storm at sea only to be bitten by a viper and die.

It was common belief of the time that the sea was a place where the gods could exact vengeance, and the snakebite was likely perceived as Dike pursuing Paul after surviving the shipwreck.

== See also ==
- Lady Justice
