= Eunomia =

Minor Greek goddess

- Member of the Horae
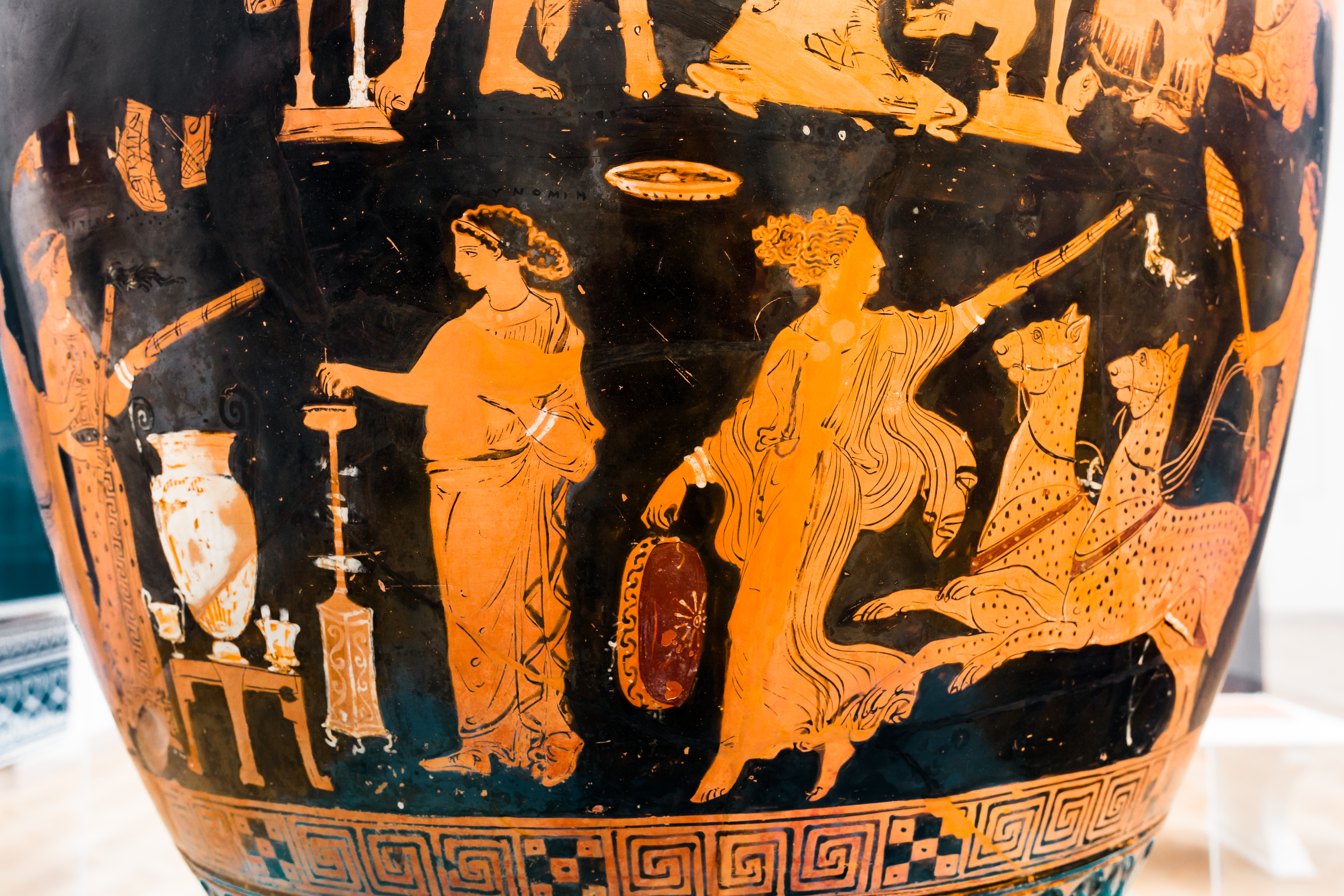
- Eunomia putting incense or corns on a thymiaterion, red-figure Apulian volute krater c. 375-350 BC, Berlin
- Ancient Greek: Εὐνομία

Genealogy
- Parents: Themis and Zeus
- Siblings: Dikē; Eirene

In Greek mythology, Eunomia (Ancient Greek: Εὐνομία) was a goddess of law and legislation. Her name can be translated as "good order", "governance according to good laws". She was also the spring-time goddess of green pastures (eû means "well, good" in Greek, and νόμος, nómos, means "law", while pasturelands are called nomia). She was by most accounts the daughter of Themis and Zeus. Her opposite number was Dysnomia (Lawlessness).

== Horae ==
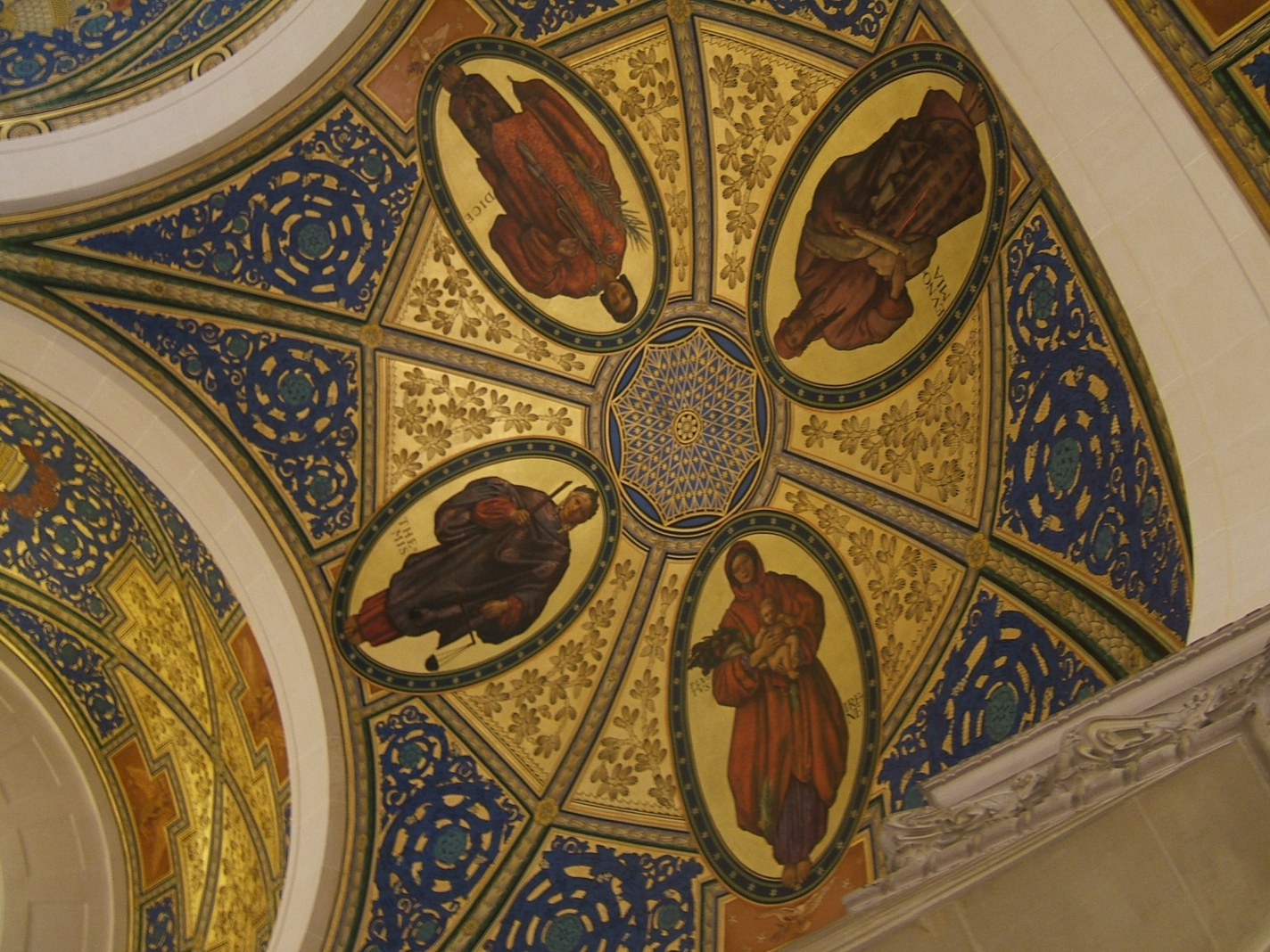
Eunomia top right with Dike, Eirene and Themis, on a ceiling painting in Den Haag.

Eunomia was the goddess of law and legislation and one of the Second Generation of the Horae along with her sisters Dikē and Eirene. The Horae were law and order goddesses who maintained the stability of society, and were worshipped primarily in the cities of Athens, Argos and Olympia. From Pindar:

Eunomia and that unsullied fountain Dikē, her sister, sure support of cities; and Eirene of the same kin, who are the stewards of wealth for humanity—three glorious daughters of wise-counselled Themis.

The Horae were also associated with natural laws, such as the seasons.

Eunomia's name, together with that of her sisters, formed a Hendiatris Good Order, Justice, and Peace.

She was frequently depicted in Athenian vase painting amongst the companions of Aphrodite, and in this sense represented the lawful or obedient behavior of women in marriage. As such she was identified with Eurynome, mother of the Charites (Graces).

== Legacy ==
The Eunomia asteroid and the Eunomia family of asteroids are named after her.
