= Corus (mythology) =

Figure in Greek mythology

In Greek mythology, Corus or Koros (Ancient Greek: Κόρος) was the spirit (daemon) and personification of surfeit and disdain. He was said to be the son of Hybris (Arrogance), the daughter of Dyssebeia (Impiety).

Corus is also the name of one of the dogs of Actaeon.
