= Pliny on mammals =

Book VIII of Pliny the Elder's Natural History centres around the concept of zoology, and mainly that which pertains to terrestrial animals, including mammals, amphibians, reptiles, as well as some birds and insects. Pliny discusses these animals as being a part of specific categories, firstly starting with those he considers to be wild, including, but not limited to, elephants, snakes, lions, giraffes, rhinoceroses, lynxes, camels, leopards, hyenas, foxes, rabbits, skinks, beavers, frogs, seals, geckoes, chameleons, deer, reindeer, jackals, porcupines, bears, hedgehogs, squirrels, snails, crocodiles, and lizards. He then goes on to cover those he considers to be domesticated, such as dogs, horses, donkeys, mules, oxen, sheep, goats, and pigs. Following this, he mentions animals that are “half-wild," or what he considers to be wild varieties of commonly domesticated animals, including boars, chamoises, ibexes, oryxes, antelopes, monkeys, and hares, as well as those that are “neither wild nor tame but of a character intermediate between each," such as swallows, bees, dolphins, and mice. Lastly, on various occasions he mentions animals that would be considered mythological, such as unicorns, pegasi, basilisks, and werewolves, of which he considers only the existence of werewolves to be obviously improbable.

Pliny describes the anatomical traits of these various animals in a way that champions morphology over scientific specificity, visualizing each animal by describing it as an amalgam of other animal parts.

Throughout these broad sections, Pliny applies the behavioural topics of cognition, symbiotic relationships, and the relevance of animals to humans. However, the perspective through which Pliny observed animals and their various attributions was biased by the fact that he lived during the first century AD (23-79 AD), and thus was subjected to the political, religious, and intellectual beliefs that were upheld in ancient Rome, such as Stoicism. Many of his observations prove to be factual, even by today's standards, while others are representative of the period in which he lived.

== Cognition ==
=== Intellectual capacity ===
Pliny spends many pages discussing the cleverness of elephants, describing them to be "the nearest to man in intelligence" and as having "virtues rare even in man," such as justice, wisdom, and honesty. Pliny even goes so far as to present various instances of elephant intelligence, such as some elephants who were known to have performed choreographed dances and walk on tight-ropes at a gladiatorial show given by Germanicus Caesar, one who had learned how to write, as reported by Mucianus, the phrase "'I myself wrote this and dedicated these spoils won from the Celts'" using the Greek alphabet, and one elephant who, after being beaten for not understanding the instructions for a particular task, was later found to be practicing the same endeavour. He even gives an example of elephants being able to sense human malevolency, in the way that they will remain calm and polite when faced with a human that means no harm, even having been known to show humans the way if they are lost, but will become fearful and quickly alert other elephants if the human is of ill-intent, which they ascertain by the smell of the human's footprints. The memory of elephant's is also a topic the Pliny discusses, providing the example of an elephant who was able to recognize an old man who many years prior, in its youth, had served as its trainer.

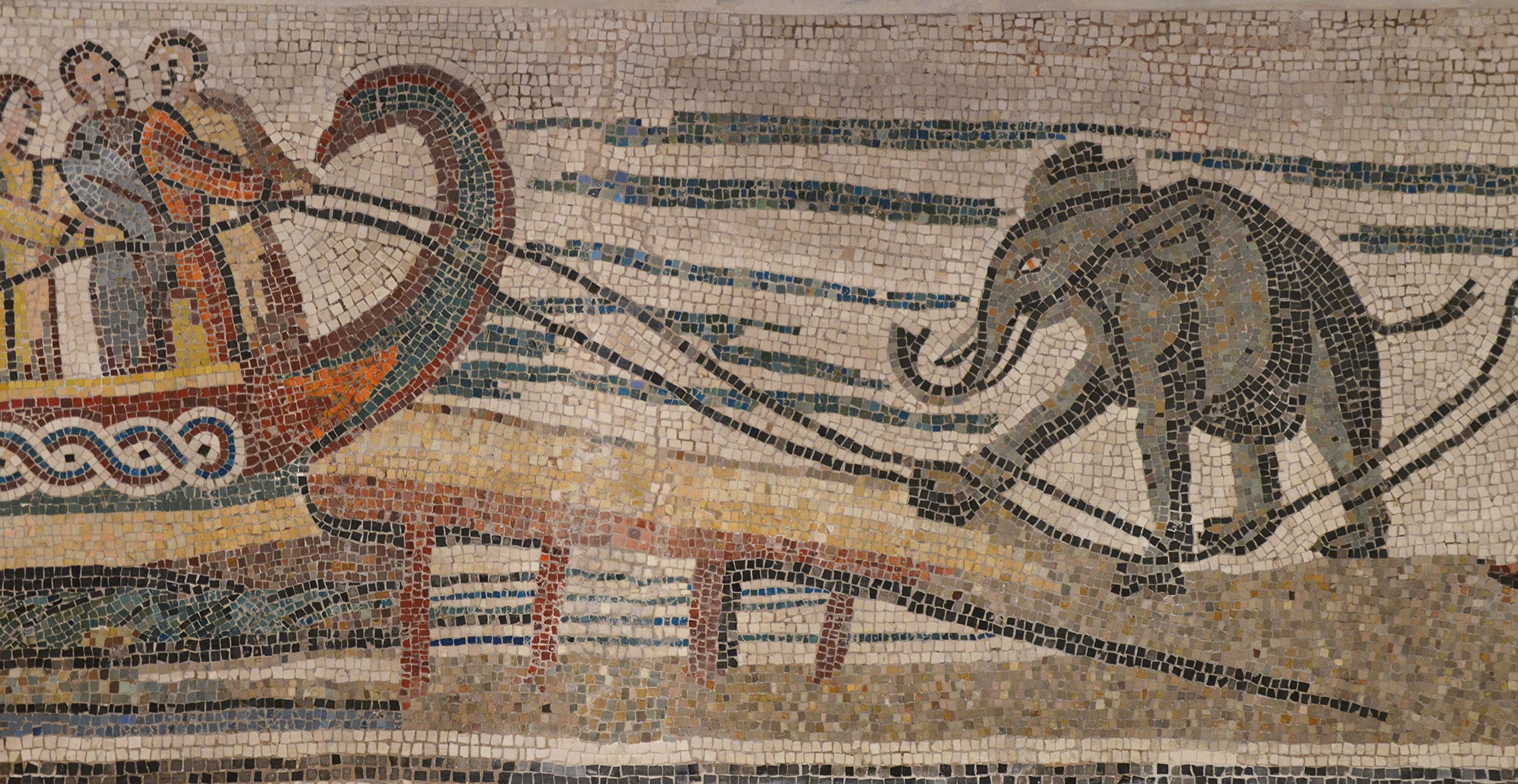
A 3-4 AD Roman mosaic of an African Elephant being loaded onto a ship, from the Etruscan city of Veii (now Isola Farnese, Italy)

Further to this, Pliny also spends time discussing the ability of various animals to engage in the conscious contemplation of specific actions that help them to avoid being hunted or poached. For example, he covers elephants smashing their tusks on trees when cornered by ivory poachers, seals intentionally vomiting up their gall, a useful ingredient in drugs, and rennet, a cure for epilepsy, to avoid being killed in order to harvest them, and hedgehogs knowingly urinating over themselves to decrease the value of their hide, for which they are hunted.

In addition to elephants, Pliny also places a great amount of focus on particular domesticated species, including dogs and horses which he describes as being the animals "most faithful to man." Pliny often praises a dogs' recognition of their master, their own name, a family member's voice, and locations, even saying that "no creature save a man has a longer memory" than a dog. Additionally, their uses in hunting and tracking are also highly valued. Meanwhile, Pliny states that "the cleverness of horses is beyond description," such that they have an unwavering docility and an understanding of their duty, whether that be to pull a chariot or to assist a javelin toss. The docility of Sybarite horses is stated to be so great that they will mourn the death of their masters who die in battle, even shedding tears at their loss.

=== Emotional competence ===
Pliny the Elder describes elephants as not only exhibiting impressive brilliance with regards to their memory, learning, and methods of survival, but also with their capacity to feel emotions. Pliny outlines the ability of elephants to shame, such that in battle they offer their conqueror leaves and dirt, and their predilection towards modesty which forces them to mate only in secret. Additionally, Pliny also comments on their morality by putting forward that elephants never engage in adultery or any of the intermale competition "that is so disastrous to the other animals." However, Pliny specifies that this is not due to a lack of emotion, and provides several examples of elephants falling in love with humans, and in one instance so intensely that the elephant refused to eat without the presence of its preferred person.

Pliny repeatedly refers to the distinct behavioural phenomena of animals feeling gratitude and respect towards humans. For example, he recounts the tale of a lion who, after having a painful bone pulled from its teeth, always brought any game it caught to its saviour, a female panther who guides a man out of the desert after he rescues her cubs from a pit, a snake who, after being formerly kept as a pet by a man, came to his aid when he was later ambushed by brigands, and a dog who continued to defend his deceased owner in battle despite being severely wounded.

== Interspecies relationships ==
=== Competition ===
Pliny states that elephants "hate the mouse worst of living creatures," and if they happen to find one in the fodder they are eating they will become disgusted. He also asserts that snakes are continuously at odds with elephants.

As well, it is suggested that "the greatest enemy of the snail is the lizard."

=== Hybridization ===
As described by Pliny, it was apparently a practice of Indians to breed tigers with female dogs to obtain a fiercer animal, while it was a practice of the Gauls to breed wolves with dogs and the results of these matings then serving as the leaders of their dog packs.

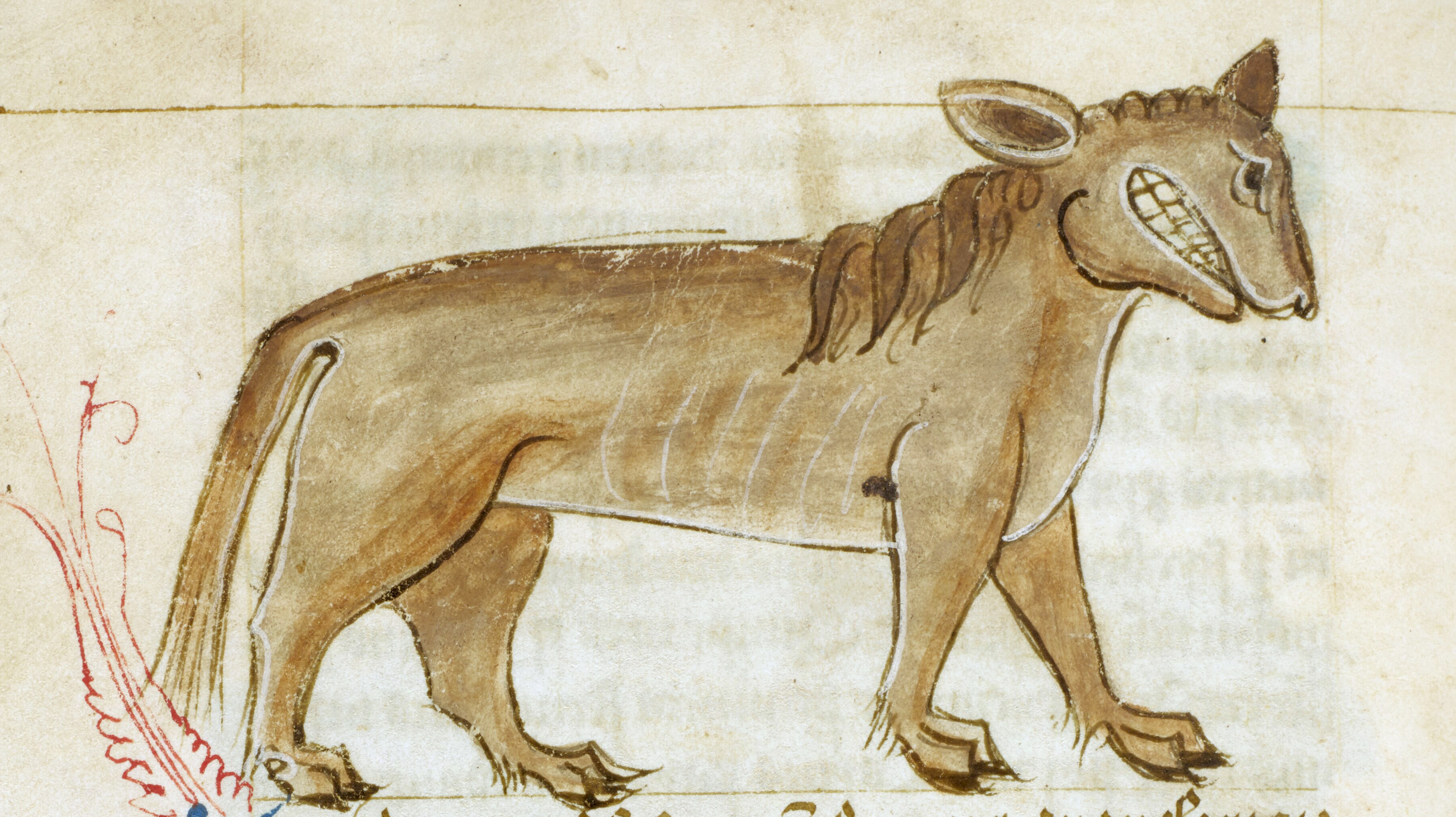
A medieval illustration of a Corocotta from The Bestiary of Anne Walshe (ca. 1400-1425 AD)

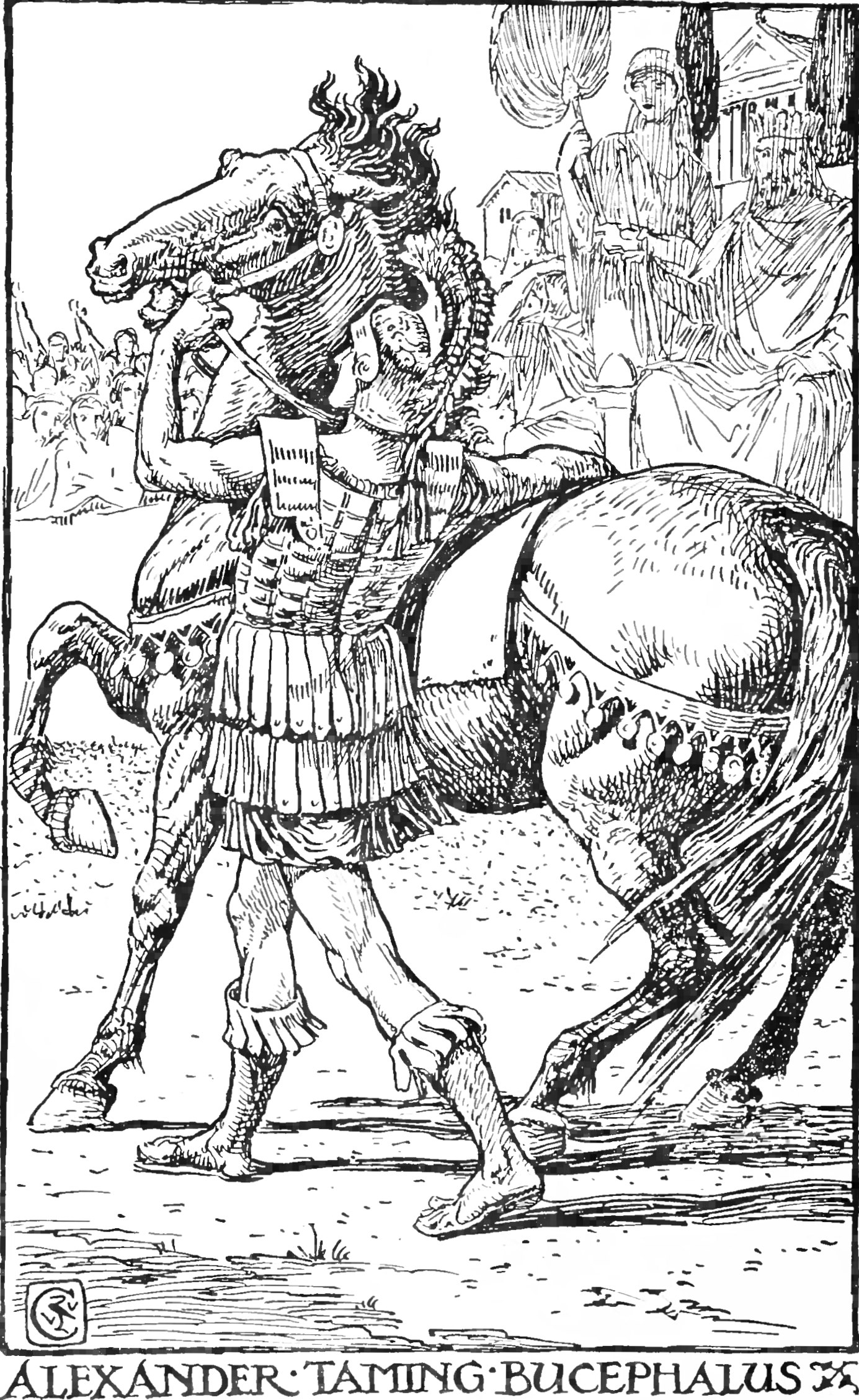
An illustration of Alexander taming Bucephalus from The Children's Plutarch: Tales of the Romans by Frederick James Gould (1910)

Pliny states that lions can interbreed with leopards, and he also suggests that lionesses can mate with hyenas to produce a mythical species called the corocotta.

== Human relevance ==
=== Domestication and companionship ===
Pliny frequently recounts tales of famous animals that were either devoted to their owners, exceptionally brave in battle, or hilariously amusing at the circus or coliseum, such as Alexander the Great’s famous horse, Bucephalus, who engaged in great feats of bravery during war and when adorned with a royal saddle would not let anyone else mount.

Julius Caesar is also said to have had a horse that would not let anyone else mount it, and that it possessed front hooves that resembled the feet of a human. Pliny states that this horse, complete with human feet, was represented in a statue that stood in front of the Temple of Venus Genetrix.

In addition, Pliny describes many famous instances where dogs displayed loyalty for their owners, such as at the funeral of King Lysimachus, whose dog, Hyrcanus, threw himself into the pyre in which his master was being burned, and how the dog of King Nicomedes of Bithynia is believed to have bitten his wife, Consingis, when she played a joke on him. He also recounts an elaborate story in which Titius Sabinus and his slaves were put in prison and a dog belonging to one of them could not be driven from his side, even refusing to leave his dead body when it was thrown onto the Steps of Lamentation. It is described that any food that the public offered the dog was directly delivered to the mouth of the dead man, and that when the corpse was finally thrown into the river Tiber the dog swam after it and attempted to keep it afloat.

=== Medicines and other animal resources ===
One point to note about Book VIII of Natural History is Pliny’s insistence on the beneficial effects of animal products for human health, which would now be considered homeopathy or folk medicine, as they do not have a scientific basis. Pliny’s medicinal substances cover a wide range of animals, internal and external organs, diseases, and purposes. In the article titled Animal Substances in Materia Medica: A Study in the Persistence of The Primitive, Loren MacKinney proposes that animal resources were commonly used for ancient medicinal practices within many civilizations, such as those found in Egypt, Greece, and Rome. In particular, MacKinney considers Pliny the Elder to be an influential source as to the use of natural remedies in the Roman Empire, and that Natural History is “one of the most comprehensive of all sources of information concerning the materia medica of the ancient world."

In terms of the supposed medicinal values present in various animal parts, Pliny states that the gall and rennet of a seal are useful for drugs and “epileptic attacks,” respectively, the shedded skin of a gecko can cure epilepsy, the right horn of a stag is imbued with a potent healing drug, goat liver can cure night-blindness, the skink can act as an antidote to poisons and an aphrodisiac for males, the smell of burning deer’s horns can stop epileptic seizures, the consumption of venison from a deer that has been killed with only one wound prevents feverish diseases, and that bear fat is useful in the preparation of medicines and for preventing baldness.

=== Historical influence ===
The Roman perspective and Stoicism were two major ideologies that likely informed Pliny’s manner of observing mammals, and thus how he contextualized them within the work of Natural History. The Roman consciousness held an idea of anthropocentricity, in which man was perceived to be the highest level of physical beings and that “the rest of creation existed to serve his needs." Thereby, Pliny may have been influenced to write about animals by highlighting their benefit to humans, such as in his numerous points on medicinal properties, companionship, and domestication. Stoicism encompassed ethical ideals involving “independence of mind” and “devotion to duty," which possibly affected Pliny’s opinions on the cognitive capabilities of animals, such as their consciousness and loyalty.

Further to this, in his analyzing the narrative structure of Pliny, Thorsten Fögen asserts that the way that Pliny describes elephants is akin to the virtuosity of "good Roman citizens," and that elephants could serve as a representative for how humans should behave. Fögen also highlights how Pliny's aim in composing Natural History seemed to be centred around communicating the ethical components of animal behaviour through the discussion, as well as many examples, of their moral qualities and anthropomorphic traits.

Additionally, because of the expansion of the Roman Empire that was occurring as Natural History was being composed, many new discoveries were made that contributed to a growing Roman fascination with “mirabilia," or things that were considered to be unique and unusual. This may have contributed to Pliny’s inclusion of peculiar animals and odd animal behaviours.
