= Manticore =

Mythical lion beast in Persian folklore

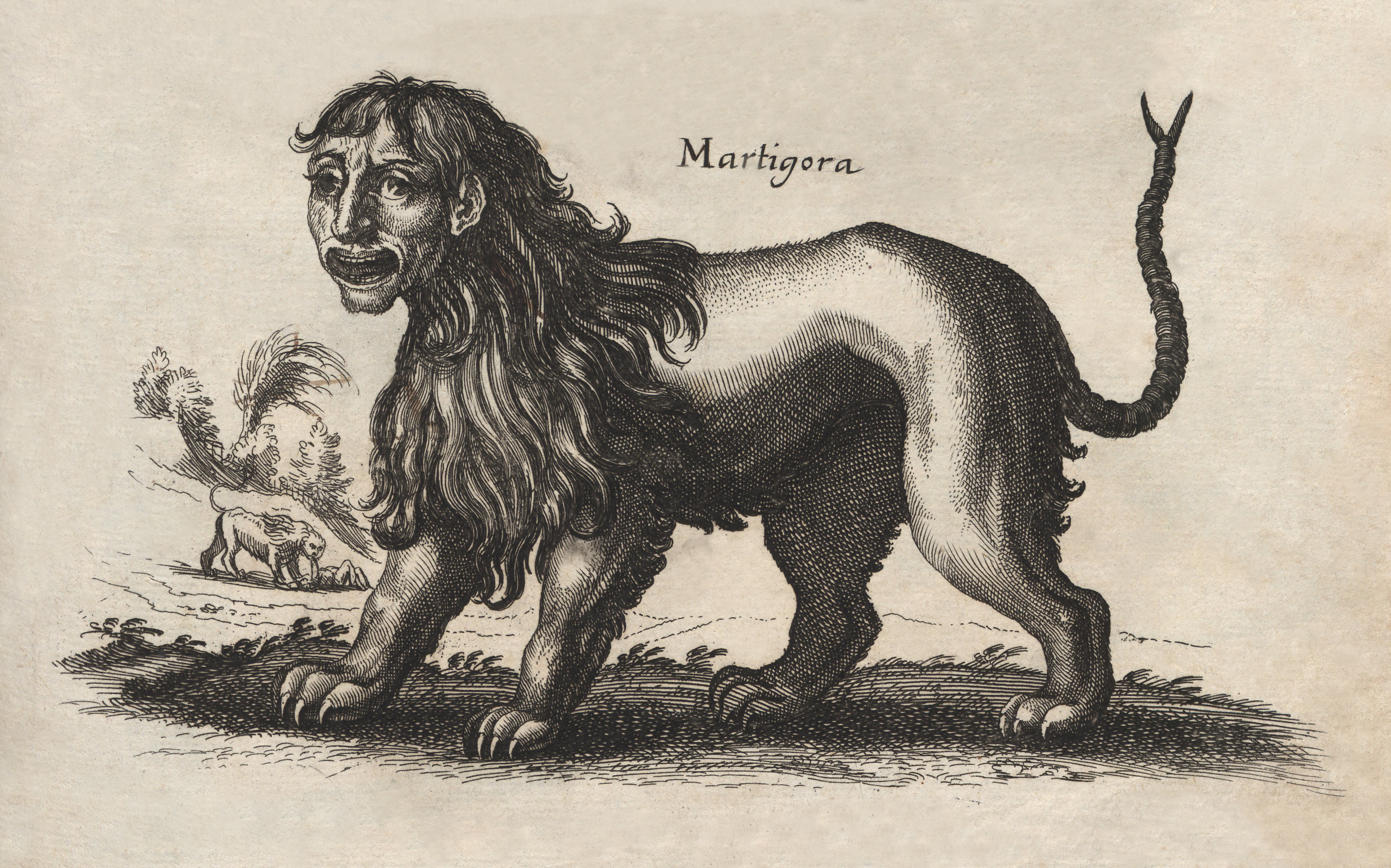
Manticore or "Martigora" ― Johannes Jonston (1652), Historiae Naturalis Copperplate engraving by Matthäus Merian.

The manticore or mantichore (Latin: mantichorās; reconstructed Old Persian: *martyahvārah; Modern Persian: مردخوار mardḫ(w)ār) is a legendary creature from ancient Persian mythology, similar to the Egyptian sphinx, the image of whom also proliferated through Western European medieval art. It has the face of a human, the body of a lion, and the tail of a scorpion or a tail covered in venomous spines similar to porcupine quills. There are some accounts that the spines can be launched like arrows. It eats its victims whole, using its three rows of teeth, and leaves no bones behind.

== Etymology ==
The English-language term manticore comes via Latin mantichorās from Ancient Greek μαρτιχόρας (martikhórās). This in turn is a transliteration of an Old Persian compound word consisting of martīya 'man' and x^{u}ar- stem, 'to eat' (modern Persian: مرد; mard + خوردن; ḫordan); (Note: Early Middle Persian مارتیا martya "man" (as in human) and خوار ḫ(w)ār- "to eat") i.e., man-eater.

An early account of the manticore and of its naming occurs in Indica by Ctesias, a Greek physician of the 5th century BCE who worked at the Persian court during the Achaemenid dynasty. Ctesias based his report on the testimonies of his Persian-speaking informants who had travelled to India. He recorded the Persian-language name of the beast as martichora (μαρτιχόρα), which translated into Greek as androphagon or anthropophagon (ἀνθρωποφάγον), i.e., "man-eater". (Note: Edward Topsell noted in 1607 that mantichora, otherwise known as martiora, "in the Persian tongue signifieth a devourer of men". (for further information on Topsell's manticore, cf. infra.) But the name was mistranscribed as 'mantichoras' in a faulty copy of Aristotle, through whose works the legend of the manticore was perpetuated across Europe.

Ctesias was later cited by Pausanias regarding the martichoras or androphagos of India.

== Classical literature ==
An account of the manticore was given in Ctesias's lost book Indica ("India"), and circulated among Greek writers on natural history, but has survived only in fragments and epitomes preserved by later writers.

Photius's Myriobiblon (or Bibliotheca, 9th century) serves as base text, but Aelian (De Natura Animalium, 3rd century) preserves the same information and more:

(Paraphrase) The martichora was allegedly a blue-eyed, human-faced wild beast of India. It was the size of the largest lion, with cinnabar-red fur. It has three rows of teeth, feet and claws like lions. (Note: Greek, "red like cinnabar ἐρυθρός ὡς κιννάβαρι"; "light-blue eyes ὀφθαλμοὺς γλαυκοὺς".) (Note: Pliny has "eyes light-blue, blood-colored body like a lion oculis glaucis, colore sanguineo, corpore leonis".) It also had a scorpion-like tail with a (main) terminal sting that measured over 1 cubit, plus two rows of auxiliary stings, each a Greek foot long. The sting was instantly fatal. The stings could be fired sideways, forward, or backward, by orienting the tail accordingly, up to a 1 plethron distance range, and these stings regenerated afterwards. Only the elephant was immune to the poison. And it overcomes every beast except the lion.

Aelian, citing Ctesias, adds that the Mantichora prefers to hunt humans, lying in wait and even taking down even two or three men at a time. The Indians, he continues, take the young captive and disable the tail by crushing it with a stone before the sting begins growing.

=== Pliny's Aethiopian beasts ===
Pliny described the "mantichora" in his Naturalis Historia (c. 77 AD) having relied on a faulty copy of Aristotle's natural history that contained the misspelling ("martikhoras").

Pliny also introduced the confused notion that the manticore might occur in Africa, because he had discussed this and other creatures (such as the yale) within a passage on Aethiopia. (Note: Carl (Karl) Mayhoff (ed., 1857. Plinius Hist. Nat. viii.21., i.e.. Mayhoff ed. (1875), 8.21 (30) §75, p. 74) proposed an emendation of the text eosdem "the same" to apud Indos dein which would qualify the statements to be about India.) But he also described the crocotta and the mantichora of Aethiopia together, and while the crocotta imitated the voices of men (Note: And considered to be based on the [laughing] hyena.) the mantichora of Aethiopia also mimicked human speech, on authority of Juba II, with a voice like the pipe (panpipe, fistula) mixed with trumpet.

=== Legacy ===
Ctesias purportedly saw a martichora presented to the Persian king by the Indians. The Romanised Greek Pausanias was skeptical and considered it an unreliable exaggerated account of a tiger. Apollonius of Tyana also dismissed the mantichore as a tall tale, according to the biography by Philostratus (c. 170–247).

Pliny did not share Pausanias' skepticism. And for 1500 years afterwards, it was Pliny's account, also copied by Solinus (2nd century), which was held to be authoritative on matters of natural history whether real or mythological. In the advent of Christianity, writings in the Holy Scripture combined with Plinian-Aristotelian learning gave rise to the Physiologus (also c. 2nd century), which later evolved into the medieval bestiaries some of which contained entries on the manticore.

== Medieval sources ==
=== Bestiaries ===
Manticores in bestiaries

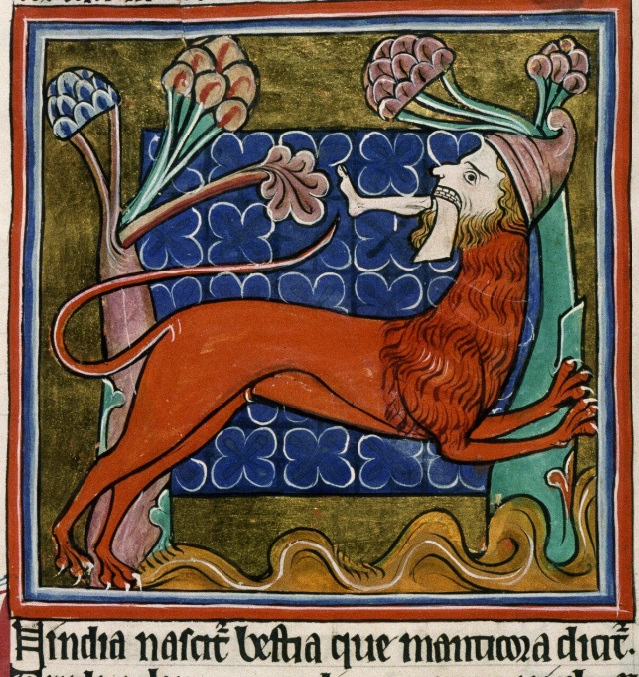
Manticore from Bodl. MS. 764, fol. 25r (c. 1225–1250)

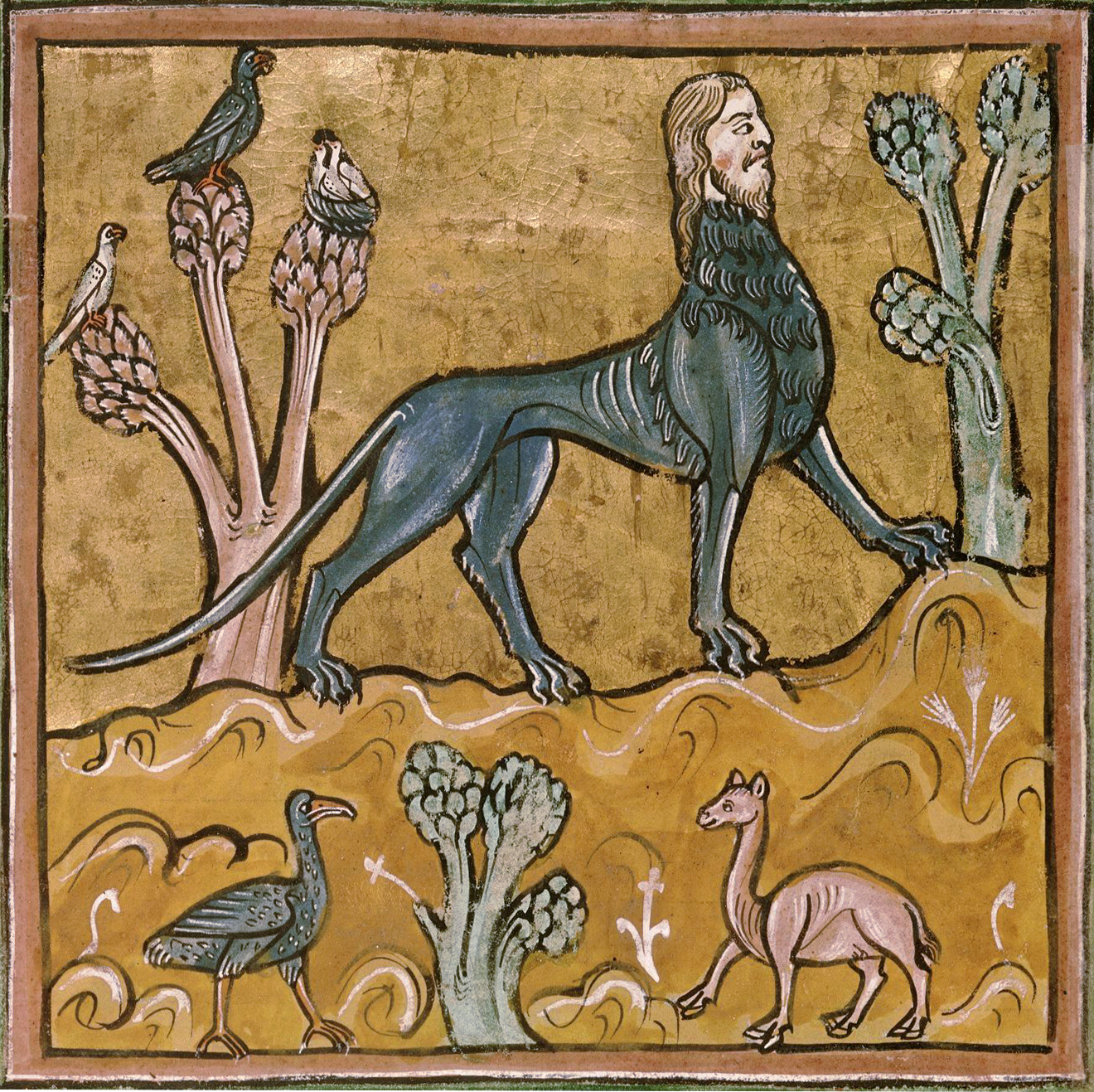
Manticore from the Rochester Bestiary (c. 1230–1240)

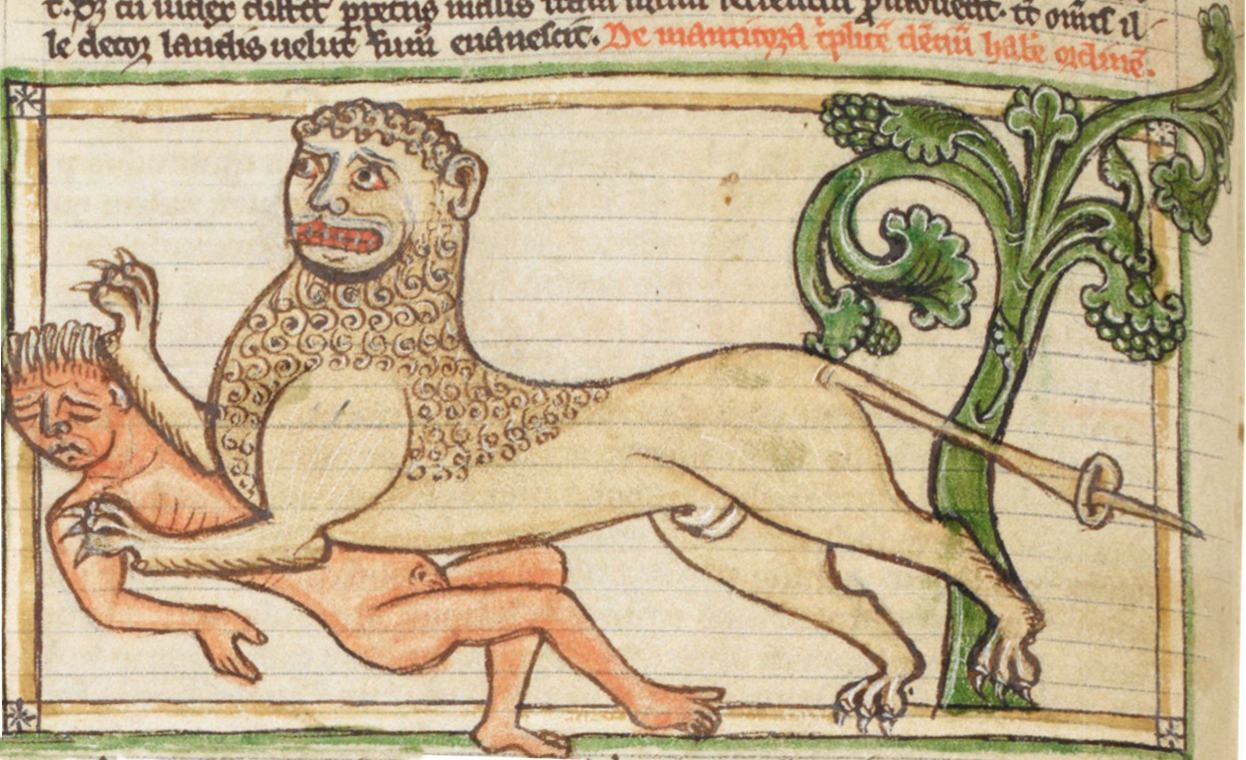
Manticore in the bestiary bound in a theological miscellany, British Library Harley MS 3244, ff 36r–71v (early 13th century)

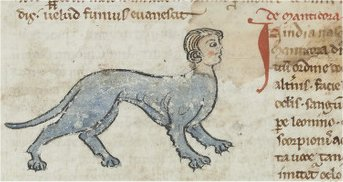
Manticore in BnF Latin 6838 B, fo.010r

The manticore has been included in some medieval bestiaries, with accompanying illustrations, though not all.

The thick-maned (and long-bearded) manticore wearing a Phrygian cap is a commonplace design (fig., top left). (Note: McCulloch (1962), p. 142: "more usual is its depiction as a heavily maned beast having a man's face topped by a Phrygian cap .."; Wiedl (2010): "mid thirteenth-century Salisbury bestiary with its pointed Phrygian hat, long beard and grotesque profile", citing Higgs Strikland, Debra (2003) Saracens, Demons, & Jews, 136, figure 60 and pl.3; Pamela Gravestock, "Did Imaginary Animals Exist?," The Mark of the Beast, p. 121. Both name Bodl. 764 as example.)

In most instances, the manticora is "coloured red or brown and has clawed feet". Artists took the liberty of coloring the manticore blue at times. One example is depicted "as a long-haired blond" (fig., top right). (Note: Roy.12 F xiii) Another has the face of a woman and the body of a blue manticore (fig., bottom right) . (Note: BnF Latin 6838 B)

Most manuscripts do not bother detailing the scorpion tail and simply draw a long cat's tail, but in Harley MS 3244 the manticore has an "oddly pointed tail" or an "extraordinary spike on the end" of it, and a tail covered in spikes from end to end is shown on the manticore in several other second family manuscripts. (Note: University College Library (Oxford), MS. 120, Ashmole 1511, fol. 22v., Douce 151, ol. 18v.)

The three-rows of teeth are not faithfully represented except in some third family examples.

==== Manuscripts and text ====
===== Second Family =====
The manticore (Latin: manticora) occurs in about half of the Second Family Latin bestiaries. The specific source used in this case was probably Solinus (2nd century), (Note: In the base MS. Add. 11283, the manticore (fol. 8r) and the other hybrids around it has scholia marked "Solinus Cap. 65, p. 244". But these are presumably later scribal additions, not disclosure of source by the original creators.)

The text here describing the beast (Note: Clark (2006). "XXIII De manticora/Chapter 23 Manticor", p. 139 (Latin text and English tr.). The base text is British Library MS Add. 11283, dated to 1180s by Clark.) differs little from Pliny's Latin version in language, or the Greek version in content (paraphrased above). This is naturally the case, since much of Solinus was recopied out of Pliny. The manticora is here described as "bloody-colored" rather than "red like cinnabar". (Note: While McCulloch translates literally as "bluish eyes, a lion's body the color of blood", Clark gives the freer translation "green eyes, a russet color lion".)

The text concludes by stating that the manticore "seeks human flesh, is active, and leaps so that neither large spaces nor broad obstacles can delay it (neither the broadest space nor the widest barrier can hinder it)".

===== H text =====
Actually there are two candidate sources given for the passage, "Solinus 52.37" and "H iii.8"; this "H" being the pseudo-Hugh of Saint Victor De bestiis et aliis rebus, edited by Migne, but this source has been regarded circumspectly as the "problematic De bestiis et aliis rebus" by Clark.

===== Transitional =====
The manticore also occurs in the earliest "Transitional" First Family bestiary (c. 1185), (Note: Morgan Library, MS M.81 (The Worksop Bestiary) (c. 1185). Recognized in Badke's mss. containing the manticore. Note it is not older than the early Second Family Additional MS 11283.) and some Third Family codices as well, whose illustrations attempted to reproduce some of the finer details given in its text.

==== Confounding with other hybrid beasts ====
As aforementioned, the manticore is one of three hybrids from Aithiopia described together by Solinus, appearing in (nearly) successive chapters of the bestiary. (Note: Clark (2006), "XXI De leucrotar/Chapter 23 Manticor", p. 139; "XII De crocodrillo/Chapter 22 Crocodile", p. 140; "XXIII De manticora/Chapter 23 Manticor", p. 141; "XXIV De parandro/Chapter 24 Parandrus", p. 141.) (Note: XXII. De Cocodrillo (crocodile) intervenes (but this is probably not a hybrid).) This created the groundwork for the beasts in adjacent chapters being confounded or amalgamated through scribal errors, as described below in the cases of bestiaries produced in France.

==== French mistransmission ====
The manticore is basically absent from the French bestiary of Pierre de Beauvais, (Note: For Pierre de Beauvais's bestiary (in French), the probable direct source was Honorius Augustodunensis which derived from Pliny and Solinus.) which exist in the short versions of 38 or 39 chapters, and the long version of 71 chapters. Instead, there is a Chapter 44 on the "centicore" (or santicora, var. ceucrocata), which suggests manticore in name, but which is nothing like the standard manticore. (Note: Standard manticore, i.e., such as described in the pseudo Hugo de St. Victor, McCulloch's so-called "H" text, cf. explanatory note, supra.) (Note: At least in the Pierre mss. known in France. But the manticore is included in the Vatican codex of Pierre de Beauvais (longer version) according to Badke.) The name is thought to have arisen from misspellings of leucrocotta, compounded by the suffix replaced by -cora by scribal error. (Note: The "leucrocota" is given written "ceucocroca" by Honorius, aforementioned as Pierre de Beauvais's source. The ceu- being misread as "cen- in a manuscript" is "not improbable". "And doubtless the ending -ticora was the result of a scribe's attention dropping down a few lines in his source to the word manticora".) Due to further mistransmission, "centicore" became the French misnomer for the yale (eale), a mythic antelope which should be a separate entry in the bestiaries. (Note: As according to George C. Druce (1911) McCulloch explains that Gauthier (Gossouin de Metz), in his Image du Monde gave the name "centicore", "leucrota", followed by a chapter on the yale but leaving out a name. This later caused a merge of "centicore" with description of the yale.)

Neither manticore nor leucrotta (French: lucrote) appears in Philippe de Thaun's bestiary in Anglo-Norman verse. (Note: Even though Badke lists Philippe de Thaun (MS Cotton Nero A V) as well as a manuscript of Image du Monde (the aforementioned testament to "centicore") as including manticore.)

== Post-medieval natural history ==
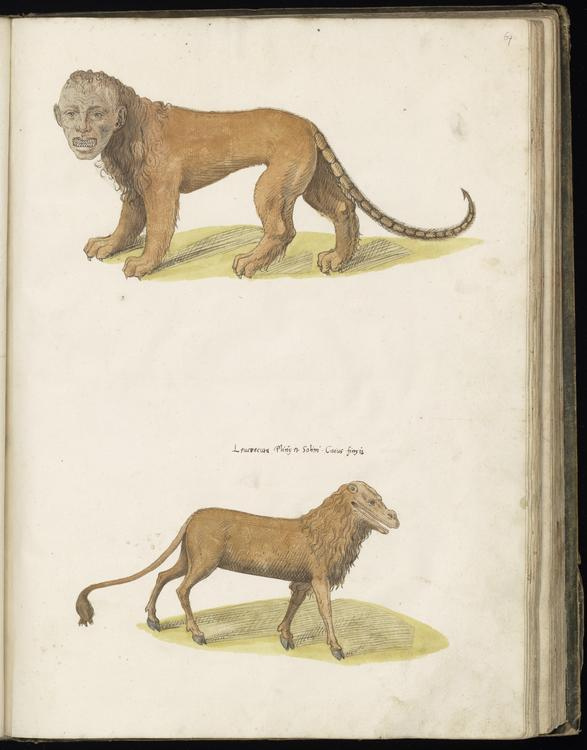
A manticore and a crocotta. Prepared for Felix Platter's Historiae animalium (1551–1558).

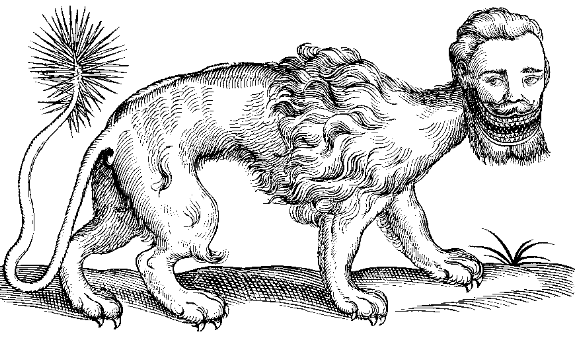
Woodcut from Edward Topsell's The Historie of Foure-footed Beastes (1607) (Note: Topsell (1658) is a two volume in one reprint, with the "§ Mantichora" text and woodcut reprinted in pp. 343–345)

Edward Topsell, in 1607, described the manticore as:

bred among the Indians, having a treble rowe of teeth beneath and above, whose greatnesse, roughnesse, and feete are like a Lyons, his face and eares like unto a mans, his eies grey, and collour red, his taile like the taile of a Scorpion of the earth, armed with a sting, casting forth sharp pointed quills, his voice like the voice of a small trumpet or pipe, being in course as swift as a Hart; His wildnes such as can never be tamed, and his appetite is especially to the flesh of man. His body like the body of a Lyon, being very apt both to leape and to run, so as no distance or space doth hinder him,..

Topsell thought the manticore was described by other names elsewhere. He thought that it was the "same Beast which Avicen calleth Marion, and Maricomorion" and also, the same as the "Leucrocuta, about the bigness of a wilde Ass, being in legs and Hoofs like a Hart, having his mouth reaching on both sides to his ears, and the head and face of a female like unto a Badgers".

And Topsell wrote that in India they would "bruise the buttockes and taile" of the whelp or cub they captured, causing it to be incapable of using its quills, thus removing the danger. This differs somewhat from the original sources which stated that they would crush the tail with stone to make them useless.

== Heraldry ==
Manticores in heraldry

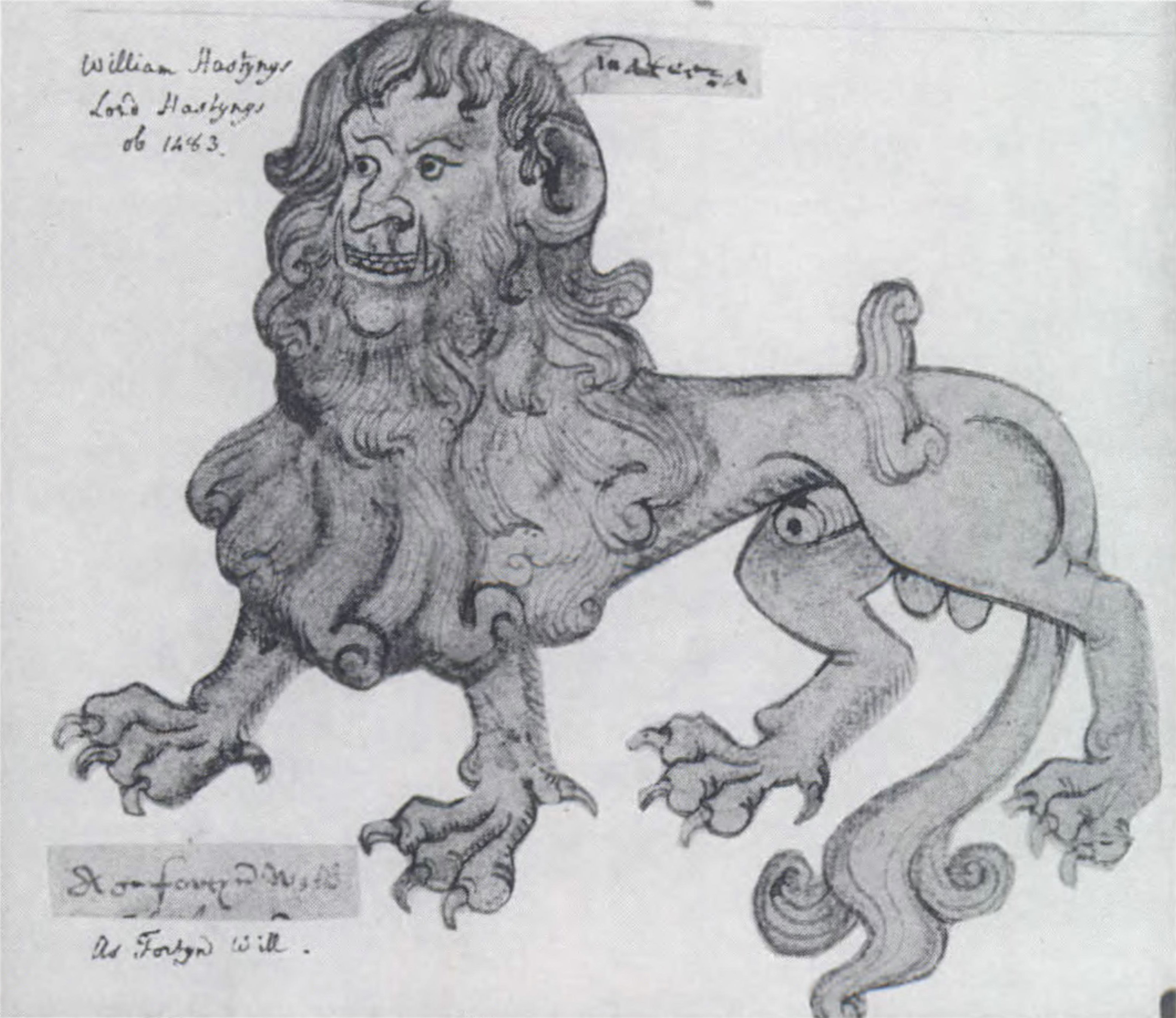
Manticore/mantyger badge of William, Lord Hastings, c. 1470. This version has tusks.

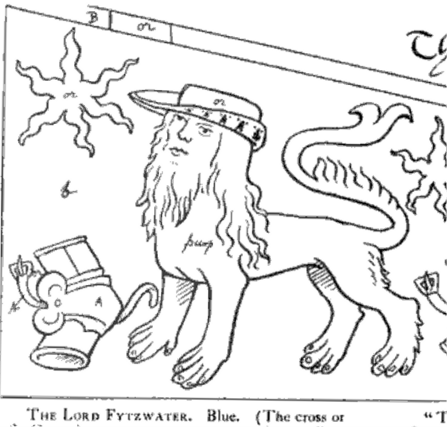
A man-tyger (manticore), Lord Fitzwater's (Radcliffe's) banner.

The likeness of manticore or similar creatures by another name have been used in heraldry, spanning from the late High Middle Ages into the modern period. A number of broadly related terms are utilized in heraldry, including manticore, mantygre, satyral, lampago, and variant spellings. Whether these are treated as variant terminology for the same charge or as distinct entities varies between different heraldic authorities.

The mantyger is glossed as merely a variant reading of manticore in the OED, while the heraldic scholar Arthur Charles Fox-Davies classed the "manticore", "mantegre", and "man-tiger" together as a variant of the "man-lion" or "lympago", a modification of the heraldic lion with a human face, with horns on its forehead. However, the 17th century heraldry collector Randle Holme made a fine distinction between manticore and mantyger. Holme's description of the manticore seems to derive directly from naturalist Edward Topsell (cf. above),

[The manticore has] the face of a man, the mouth open to the ears with a treble row of teeth beneath and above; long neck, whose greatness, roughness, body and feet are like a Lyon: of a red colour, his tail like the tail of a Scorpion of the Earth, the end armed with a sting, casting forth sharp pointed quills.

while he describes the mantyger as having

the face and ears of a man, the body of a Tyger, and whole footed like Goose or Dragon; yet others make it with feet like a Tyger,

etc., and also noting that they may be horned or unhorned.

The manticore first appeared in English heraldry in c. 1470, as a badge of William Hastings, 1st Baron Hastings; and in the 16th century.

The mantyger device was later used as a badge by Robert Radcliffe, 1st Earl of Sussex, and by Sir Anthony Babyngton. The Radford[e]'s device was described as "3 mantygers argent" by one source, c. 1600. Thus in heraldic discourse the term "manticore" became usurped by "mantyger" during the 17–18th centuries, and "mantiger" in the 19th. (Note: The corruption of amalgamation of man and tiger suggests false etymology.)

It is noted that the manticore/mantiger of heraldic devices has a beast of prey body as standard, but sometimes chosen to be given dragon feet. The Radcliffe family manticore appears to have human feet, and (not so surprisingly), a chronicler described as a "Babyon" (baboon) the device by John Radcliffe (Lord Fitzwater) accompanying Henry VIII into war in France. (Note: Cott. MS. Cleop. C. v. fol. 59.) It has also been speculated the Babyngton device is intended to represent the "Babyon, or baboon, as a play upon his name", and it also has characteristically "monkey-like feet". (Note: Related to the topic of the heraldic manticore/mantiger exhibiting "baboon" feet, it should be mentioned that there emerged a term "mantegar" meaning a "type of baboon", first attested in 1704. This is also conjectured to derived from corruption of "manticore". As a consequence, the term "mantyger" became an ambiguously variant of "manticore" or "mantegar", after c. 1704, assuming that is the correct approximate dating when the word in that sense was coined.)

The typical heraldic manticore is supposed to have not only the face of an old man, but spiraling horns as well, although this is not really ascertainable in the Radcliffe family badge, where the purple manticore is wearing a yellow cap (cap of dignity).

== Parallels ==
Gerald Brenan linked the manticore to the mantequero, a monster feeding on human fat in Andalusian folklore.

The Hindu god Narasimha is often referred to as a Manticore. Narasimha, the man lion, is the fourth avatar of Vishnu and is described as having a man's torso and the head and claws of a lion.

== In fiction ==
Dante Alighieri, in his Inferno, depicted the mythical Geryon as resembling a manticore, following Pliny's description where it has the face of an honest man, the body of a wyvern, the paws of a lion, and the stinger of a scorpion at the end of its tail.

== Fine art ==
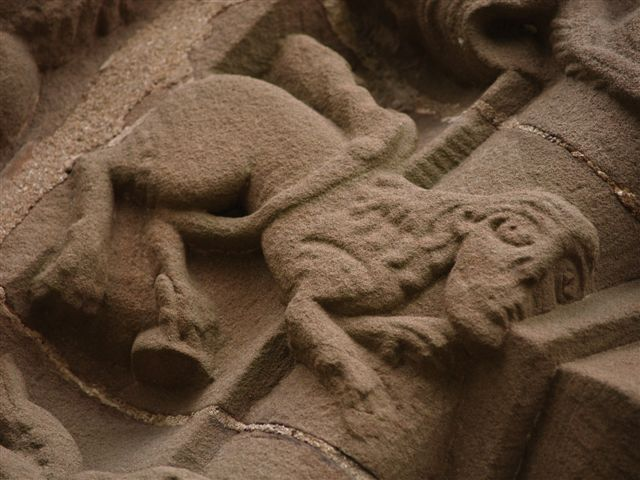
Manticore at the Church of St Mary and St David, Kilpeck, Herefordshire (12th century)

The heraldic manticore influenced some Mannerist representations of the sin of Fraud, conceived as a monstrous chimera with a beautiful woman's face – for example, in Bronzino's allegory Venus, Cupid, Folly and Time (National Gallery, London), and more commonly in the decorative schemes called grotteschi (grotesque). From here it passed by way of Cesare Ripa's Iconologia into the seventeenth- and eighteenth-century French conception of a sphinx.

== Popular culture ==
In some modern depictions, such as in the tabletop role-playing game Dungeons & Dragons (D&D) and the card game Magic: The Gathering, manticores are depicted as having wings. They are more specifically given "wings of a dragon" in the implementation of D&D′s 5th edition, according to the Monster Manual (2014), (Note: Color illustration of the manticore by Jack Stella.) (Note: Another embellished feature of this D&D version is that a "bristling mane stretches down [its] back".) though an earlier version of the manual described them as "batlike wings".

In the animated sitcom television series Krapopolis, the character of Shlub is depicted as a "mantitaur" which is a half-centaur, half-manticore creature where he was the result of a union between a female centaur and a male manticore. In this show besides the fact that the manticores are depicted with dragon-like wings like other depictions of them, the manticores are shown to have dragon-like horns on their head.

In the animated film Onward Octavia Spencer plays "Corey" The Manticore, a manticore who is the proprietor of the Manticore's Tavern.

== See also ==
- Chimera (mythology)
- Geryon
- Mythological lions
