= Thrasos =

Figure in Greek mythology

In Greek mythology, Thrasos (Ancient Greek: Θράσος) is the personified concept of boldness.

Although the word θράσος itself could be used both in the positive ("courage") and the negative ("over-boldness, insolence") senses, in the only context where Thrasos appears as a personification (a daemon), it is definitely a malicious and suspicious being, mentioned together with Hybris and Atë and opposed to Dike.

According to Euripides in his play Agamemnon:

But an old Hubris tends to bring forth in evil men, sooner or later, at the fated hour of birth, a young Hubris and that irresistible, unconquerable, unholy spirit, Recklessness [Thrasos], and for the household black Curses, which resemble their parents.
