= Nomos (mythology) =

Daemon of laws ordinances in Ancient Greek

In Greek mythology, Nomos (Ancient Greek: Νόμος, lit. 'custom, law') was the daemon of laws, statutes, and ordinances. In the Orphic Rhapsodic Theogony, Nomos' wife is Eusebia (Piety), and their daughter is Dike (Justice).

== Mythology ==
Nomos was described as the ruler of gods and men:

The holy king of Gods and men I call, celestial Law [Nomos], the righteous seal of all;
The seal which stamps whate'er the earth contains, Nature's firm basis, and the liquid plains:
Stable, and starry, of harmonious frame, preserving laws eternally the same:
Thy all-composing pow'r in heaven appears, connects its frame, and props the starry spheres;
And shakes weak Envy with tremendous sound, toss'd by thy arm in giddy whirls around.
'Tis thine, the life of mortals to defend, and crown existence with a blessed end;
For thy command and alone, of all that lives order and rule to ev'ry dwelling gives:
Ever observant of the upright mind, and of just actions the companion kind;
Foe to the lawless, with avenging ire, their steps involving in destruction dire.
Come, bless, abundant pow'r, whom all revere, by all desir'd, with favr'ing mind draw near;
Give me thro' life, on thee to fix my fight, and ne'er forsake the equal paths of right.
