= Crocotta =

Mythical dog-wolf of India or Aethiopia

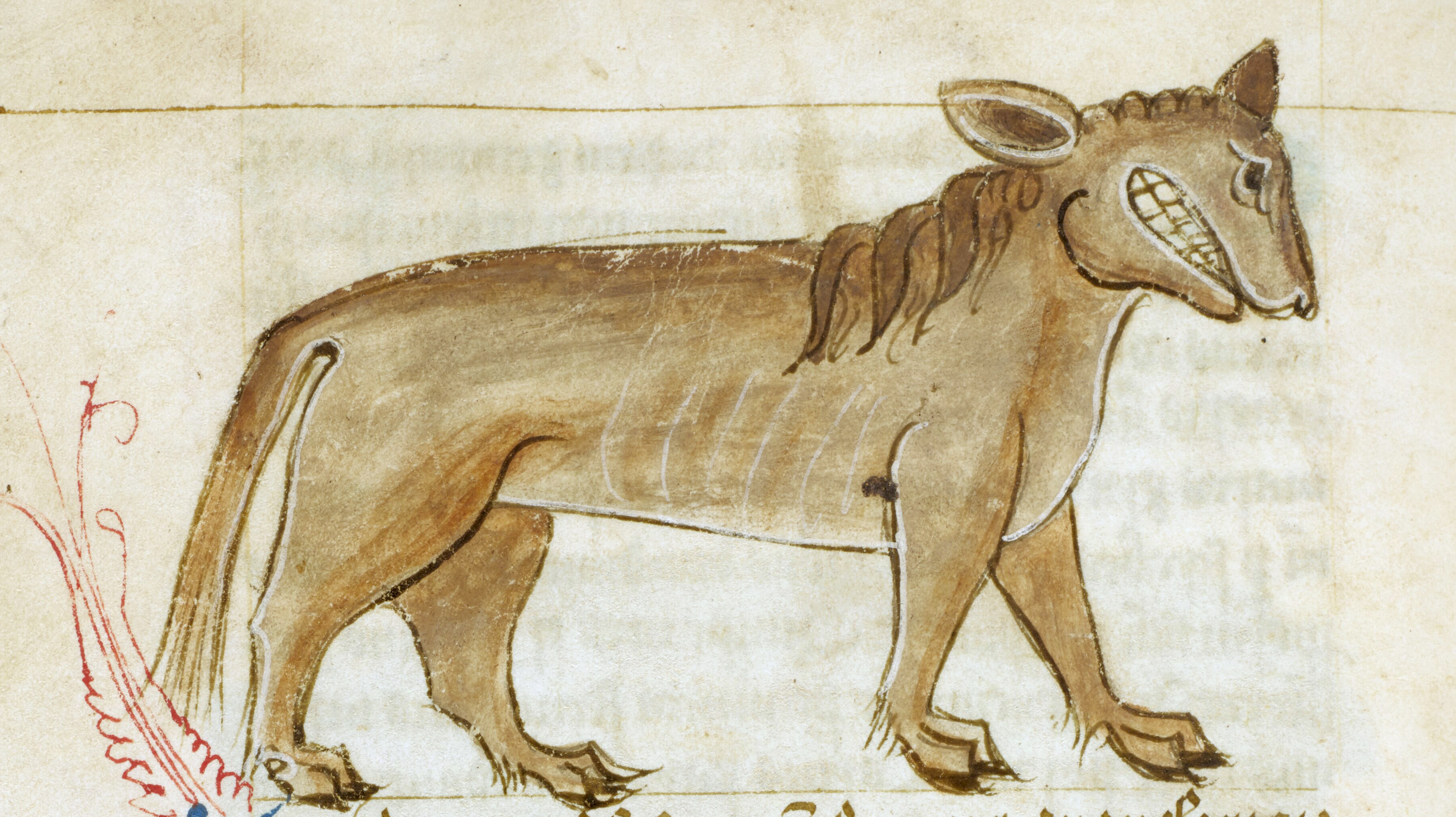
Crocotta, as illustrated in a medieval bestiary

The crocotta or corocotta, crocuta, leucrocotta, or leucrotta is a mythical dog-wolf of India or Aethiopia, linked to the hyena and said to be a deadly enemy of men and dogs.

== Ancient accounts ==
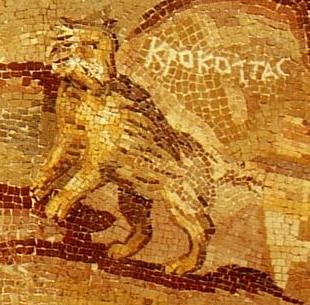
A mosaic depicting a crocotta (Greek: Κροκόττας), which in this case closely resembles a striped hyena. The mosaic in Palestrina depicts the river Nile and its fauna

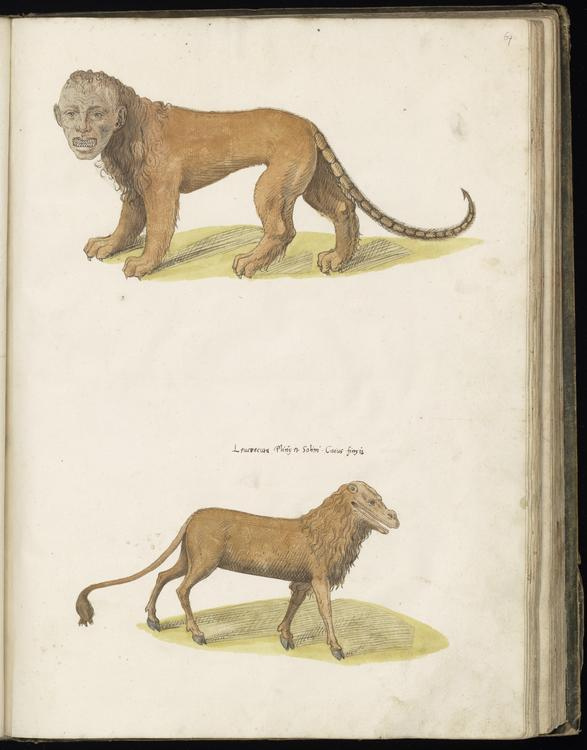
Drawing collected by Felix Platter, to be used in Historiae animalium (1551–1558). Manticore and Crocotta

Strabo, who uses the word "crocuttas", describes the beast as the mixed progeny of a wolf and a dog (Geographica, XVI.4.16]).

Pliny in his work Natural History (VIII.72 and 107) describes the crocotta as a hybrid between a hyena and lion:

When crossed with this race of animals (hyena) the Ethiopian lioness gives birth to the corocotta, that mimics the voices of men and cattle in a similar way. It has an unbroken ridge of bone in each jaw, forming a continuous tooth without any gum.

Pliny (VIII.72–73) also writes of another hyena-like creature, the leucrocotta, which he calls "the swiftest of all beasts, about the size of an ass, with a stag's haunches, a lion's neck, tail and breast, badger's head, cloven hoof, mouth opening right back to the ears, and ridges of bone in place of rows of teeth—this animal is reported to imitate the voices of human beings."

The Byzantine scholar Photius summarizing the book Indica, by the Greek author Ctesias, writes:

In Ethiopia there is an animal called crocottas, vulgarly kynolykos [dog-wolf], of amazing strength. It is said to imitate the human voice, to call men by name at night, and to devour those who approach it. It is as brave as a lion, as swift as a horse, and as strong as a bull. It cannot be overcome by any weapon of steel.

Claudius Aelianus (aka Aelian) in his book On the Characteristics of Animals (VII.22) specifically links the hyena and corocotta and mentions the creature's fabled ability to mimic human speech. Porphyry in his book On Abstinence from Animal Food (III.4), writes that "the Indian hyaena, which the natives call crocotta, speaks in a manner so human, and this without a teacher, as to go to houses, and call that person whom he knows he can easily vanquish."

According to the Augustan History, the emperor Antoninus Pius presented a corocotta, probably at his decennalia in AD 148. The historian Cassius Dio credits the later emperor Septimius Severus with bringing the crocotta to Rome, saying this "Indian species ... was then introduced into Rome for the first time, so far as I am aware. It has the color of a lioness and tiger combined, and the general appearance of those animals, as also of a dog and fox, curiously blended."

Later bestiaries of the Middle Ages confounded these various accounts, so that one finds the largely mythical creature given differing names and various characteristics, real and imaginary. Among the characteristics not found in the ancient sources was the idea that the eyes of a crocotta were striped gems that could give the possessor oracular powers when placed under the tongue. The Aberdeen Bestiary describes a Leucrota as "a swift animal born in India. It is the size of an ass with the hindquarters of a stag, the chest and legs of a lion" and shows an illustration of it on Folio 15v.

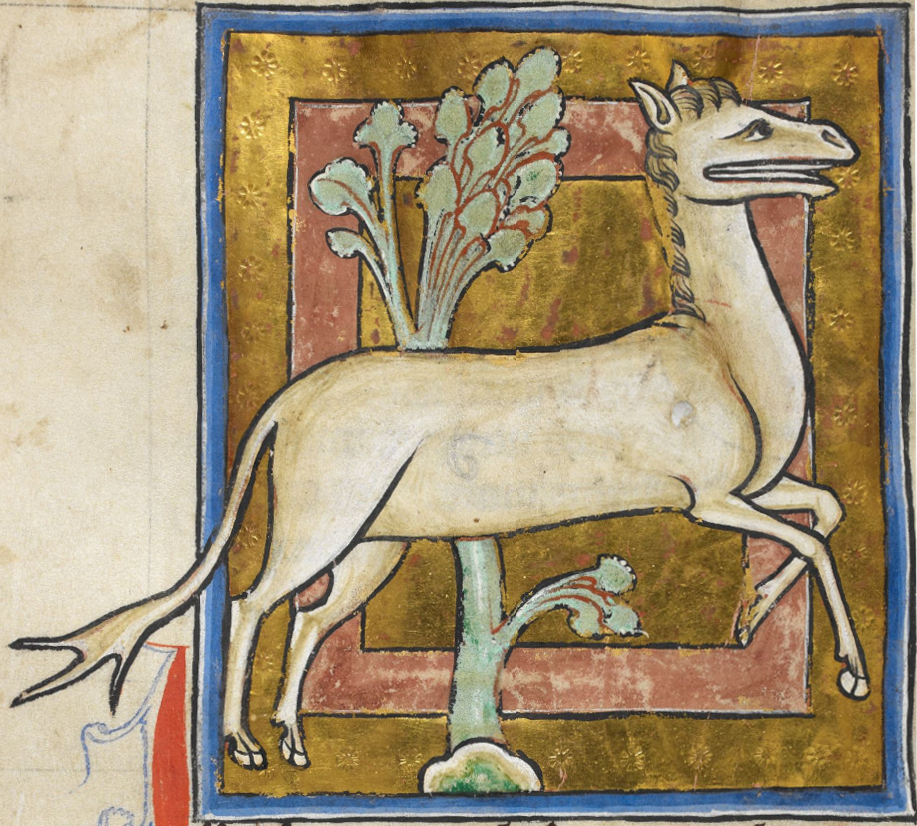
A crocotta, Bestiary, Royal MS 12 C XIX (1200-1210)

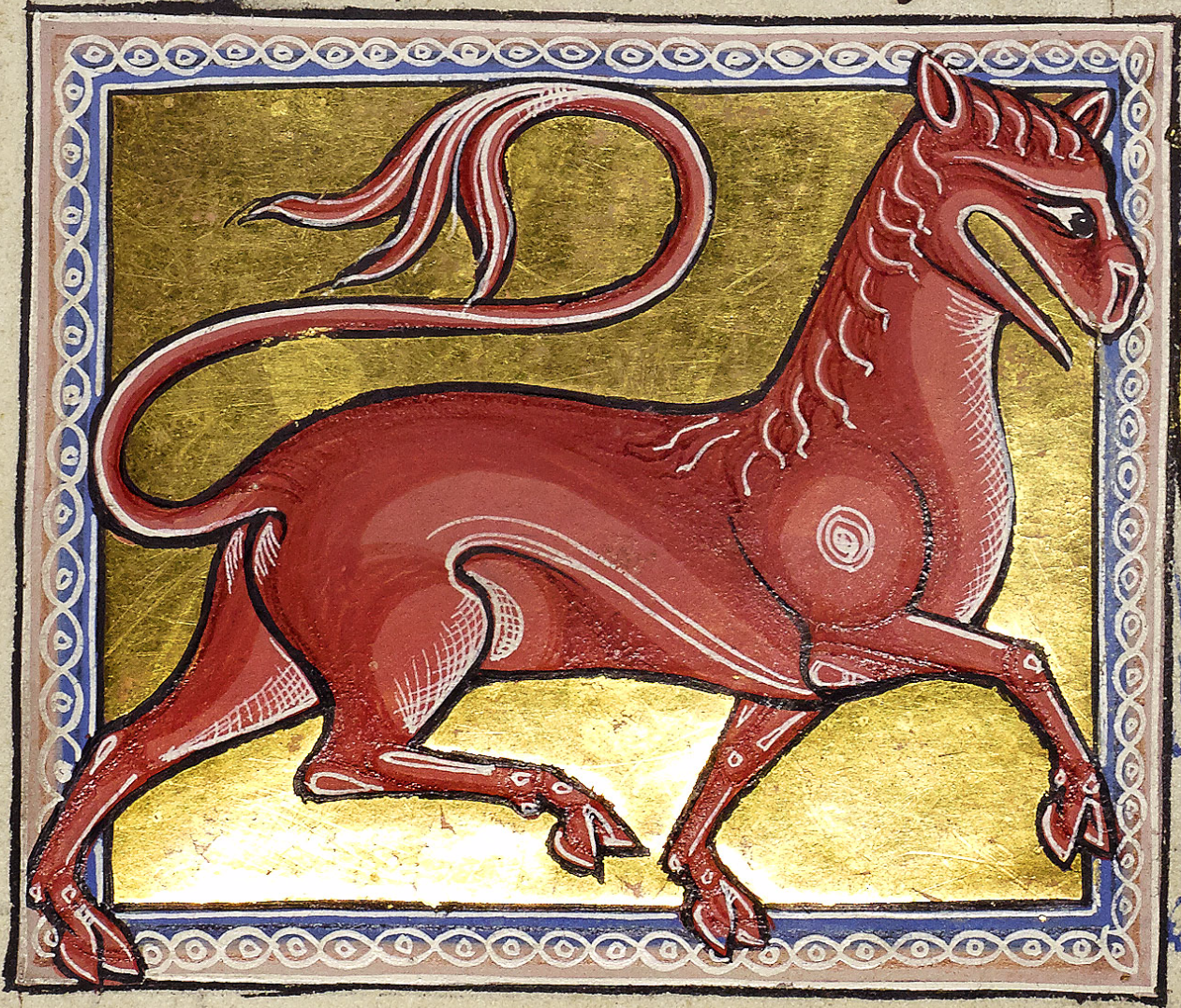
A crocotta, Aberdeen Bestiary manuscript (1200)

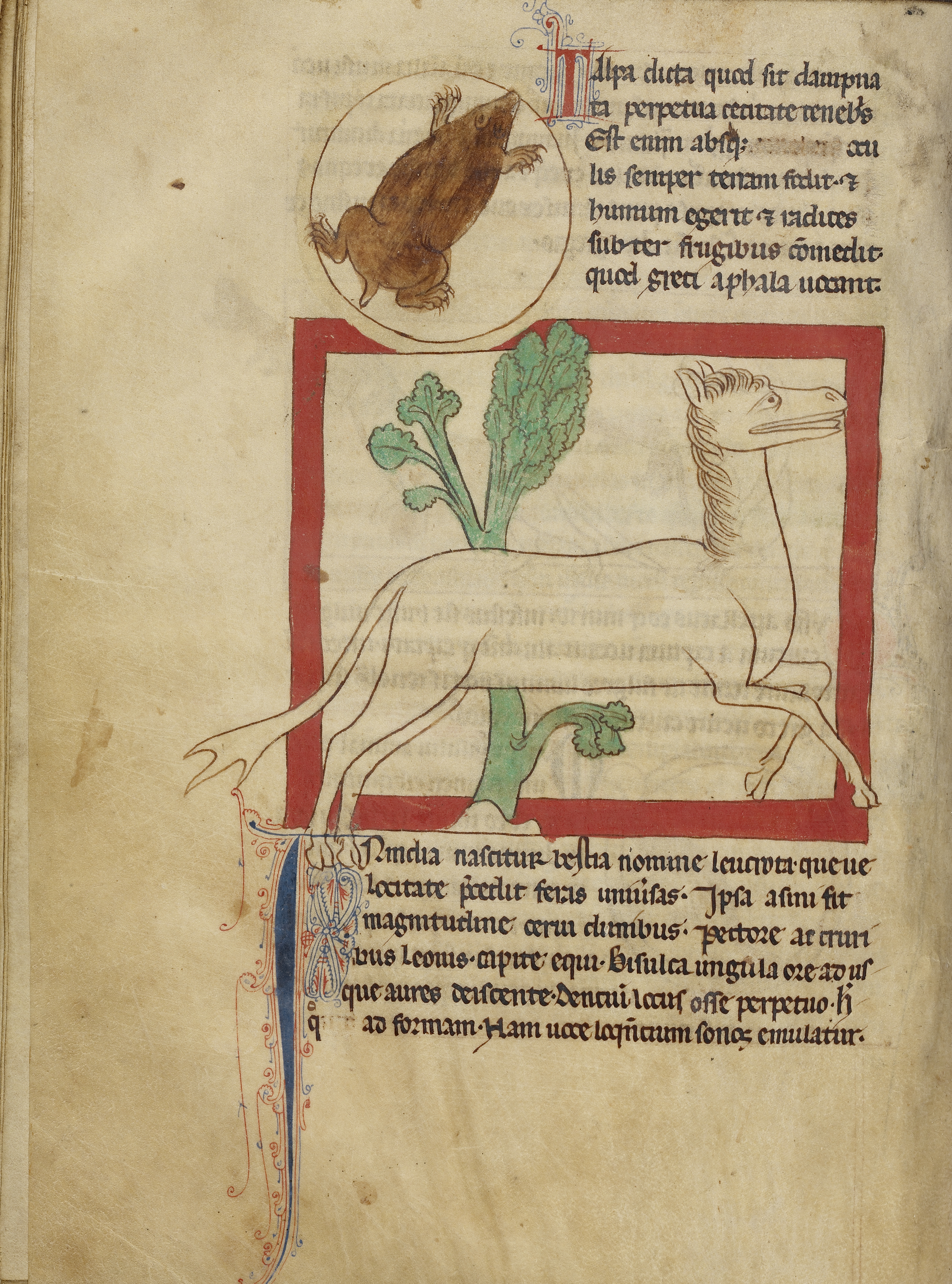
A crocotta, Northumberland Bestiary, England, circa 1250–1260

== Similarity to hyena ==
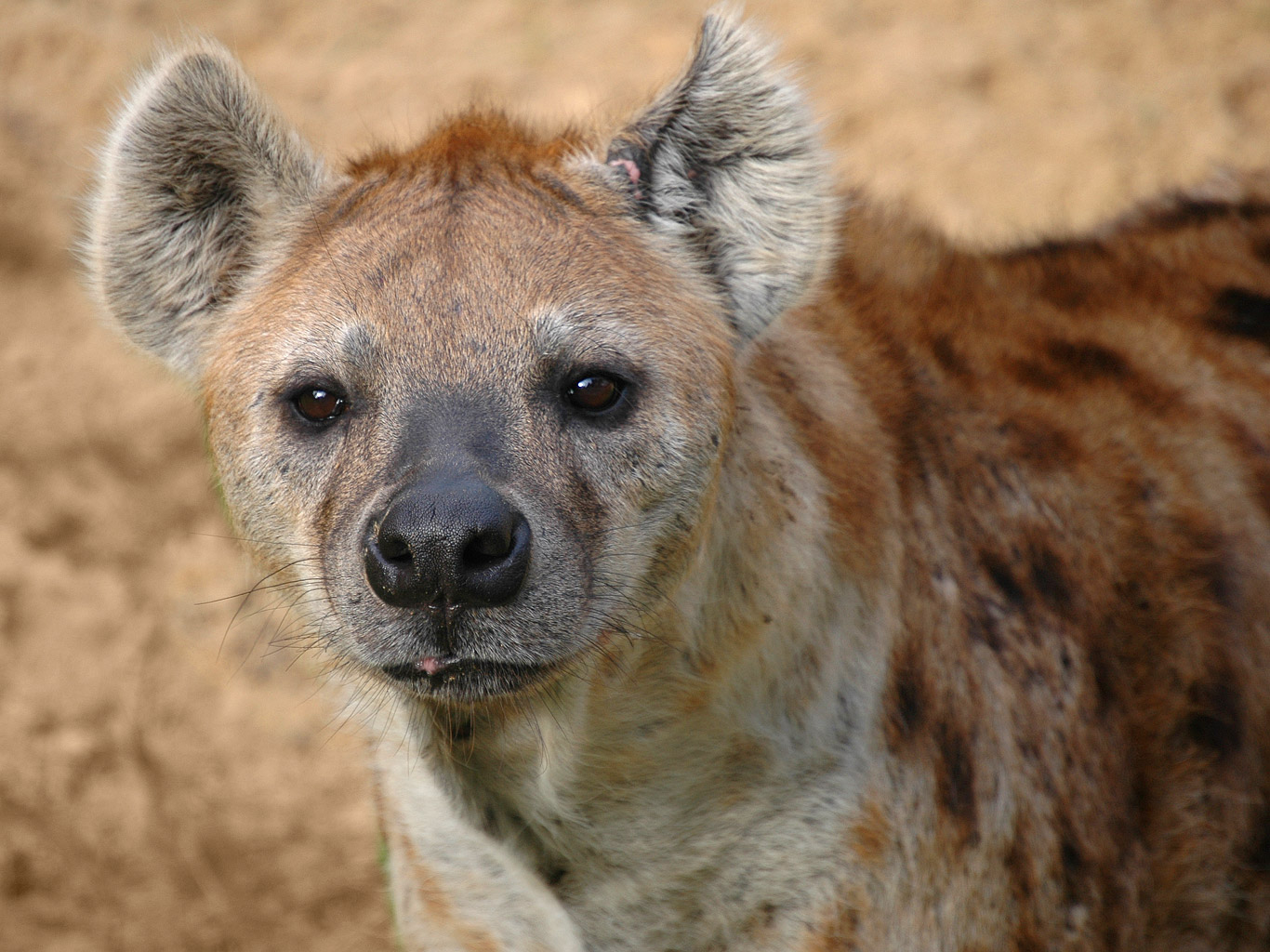
Spotted hyena, Crocuta crocuta

The scientific name of the spotted hyena (Crocuta crocuta) was taken from the mythological crocotta, and there are some similarities in the description. Hyenas do have very powerful teeth and jaws, can digest a wide range of foods, are known to dig up human bodies for food, and can make unnervingly humanlike vocalizations (such as their famous laugh). Local folklore about hyenas often gives them powers such as gender switching (males and females are difficult to distinguish), shape shifting, and human speech—all of which encourages the belief that the hyena may have contributed to the original myth of the crocotta.

== In literature ==
Cyril Tourneur's famously obscure allegorical poem The Transformed Metamorphosis uses the nonce word "leucrocutanized."

Jorge Luis Borges in his Book of Imaginary Beings expounds on the crocotta and the leucrocotta.

Leucrocottas appear in Rick Riordan's The Demigod Diaries, where Luke and Thalia encounter a small pack of them in a haunted mansion.

The leucrocotta is featured in Susanna Clarke's Jonathan Strange & Mr Norrell, in the chapter "Leucrocota, the Wolf of the Evening", where the titular character names another person in the book as one, as a reference to his personality and lifestyle.

A talking Leucrotta appears in Catherynne M. Valente's The Orphan's Tales: In The Night Garden and provides aid to the protagonists despite its fearsome appearance and reputation.

== See also ==
- Werehyena
