= Ate (mythology) =

Ancient Greek goddess of mischief

In Greek mythology, Ate (Ancient Greek: Ἄτη, romanized: Átē, lit. 'Delusion, Recklessness, Folly, Ruin') is the personification of moral blindness and error. She could blind the mind of both gods and men, leading them astray. Ate was banished from Olympus by Zeus for blinding him to Hera's trickery denying Heracles his birthright. Homer calls Ate the daughter of Zeus, while Hesiod has Ate as the daughter of Eris (Strife).

== Personification ==
Like all the children of Eris (Strife), Ate is a personified abstraction, allegorizing the meaning of her name, and represents one of the many harms which might be thought to result from discord and strife. The meaning of her name, the Greek word atē (ἄτη), is difficult to define. Atē is a verbal noun of the verb aáō (ἀάω).

According to The Cambridge Greek Lexicon, aáō means to "lead astray", "befuddle", "blind", or "delude", while ἄτη can mean: (1) the state of "delusion, infatuation (inflicted on a person's mind by a god, esp Zeus)", (2) "reckless behavior ... recklessness, folly", and (3) "ruin, calamity, harm".

As informed by the meanings and usage of the unpersonified atē, personified Ate can apparently represent any part (or all?) of the causal sequence: (1) a blinding or clouding of the mind—causing (2) ill-considered and reckless actions—causing (3) the ruin such actions entail. She is thought of as being the instigator of delusion and its resulting destruction.

== Mythology ==
Beyond being a mere personification, Ate has little actual identity. In the Iliad, Agamemnon, the leader of Greek expedition against Troy, tells the story of Ate's deception of Zeus, and her subsequent banishment from Olympus, an etiological myth supposedly explaining how Ate entered the world of men.

As told by Agamemnon, Hera tricked Zeus into swearing an oath that resulted in Zeus' son Heracles losing the birthright Zeus had intended for him. Zeus blamed Ate for clouding his mind causing him not to see Hera's deception. In great anger Zeus grabbed Ate by the hair and flung her from Mount Olympus, and thereby Ate came to inhabit the "fields of men".

According to the mythographer Apollodorus, when Ate was thrown down by Zeus, Ate landed in Phrygia at a place called "the hill of the Phrygian Ate", where the city of Troy was founded. The Hellenistic poet Lycophron, in his Alexandra, also mentions the place calling it "the high Hill of Doom [Ate]".

== Family ==
Homer's Iliad calls Ate the eldest daughter of Zeus, with no mother mentioned. However, Hesiod's Theogony has Ate as one of the several children of Eris (Strife), with no father mentioned. Her siblings include (among several others) her brothers Horkos (Oath), and the Machai (Wars), and sisters Limos (Famine), and Dysnomia (Lawlessness). Aeschylus, in his tragedy Agamemnon, has the Chorus call Peitho "the unendurable child of scheming Ruin [Ate]".

== Zeus ==
Ate is closely associated with Zeus. In the Iliad, Ate is called the "eldest" daughter of Zeus, an apparent indication of her power and her importance to Zeus. Ate (or the impersonal atē) is often referred to as the agent (or instrument) of Zeus' divine retribution. In the Iliad, Zeus is begged to send Ate so that the denier of "Prayers ... may fall and pay full recompense." Although Agamemnon blames Ate for blinding him, which led to his dishonoring Achilles, he also says that it was Zeus who robbed him of his senses. According to Hesiod, Zeus never sends war, nor famine, nor "calamity [atē]" to those who honor Justice, while Solon says that "Zeus sends [atē] to punish" men.

Ate also appears as an agent of Zeus' justice in Aeschylus's tragic trilogy the Oresteia. In Agamemnon, the first play of the trilogy, Ate is linked with Helen of Troy, and Agamemnon's wife Clytemnestra, both of whom act as agents of Zeus' retribution. Helen, who plays an instrumental role in Zeus' punishment of Troy, is likened to a "priest" of Ate, while Clytemnestra, who, by killing Agamemnon, is the direct instrument of Zeus' punishment, says that she did so with the aid of "Ruin [Ate]". In the Libation Bearers, the second play of the Oresteia, Aeschylus describes Zeus as one who sends Ate to avenge "reckless human violence!"

== Ancient Greek sources ==
Personified Ate occurs several times in Greek literature, from the Archaic through the Classical periods.

=== Homer ===
In Homer, atē is something inflicted by the gods; it causes delusion, then folly, then disaster. Ate, as the personification of atē, receives its fullest development in Homer's Iliad, his epic poem about the Trojan War. However, to what extent Homer may have considered Ate to be an actual divinity as opposed to a mere allegory is unclear. The references to the goddess in the Iliad revolve around Agamemnon's folly in having robbed Achilles, the Greeks greatest warrior, of his war prize, the slave Briseis, and Achilles' subsequent refusal to fight, which brought the Greeks to the brink of defeat. While the concept of atē is a central theme in the Iliad, occurring many times, Ate, as the personification of atē, is explicitly found in just two speeches, one in Book 9, and the other in Book 19.

==== Allegory of the Prayers ====
During the embassy to Achilles in Book 9, Achilles' old tutor Phoenix, trying to persuade Achilles to accept Agamemnon's offer of reparations, and return to battle, tells the following parable in which the "fleet of foot" Ate ("Blindness") outruns "halting" Prayers:

For Prayers there are as well, the daughters of great Zeus, halting and wrinkled and of eyes askance, and they are ever mindful to follow in the steps of Blindness. But Blindness is strong and fleet of foot, so she far outruns them all, and goes before them over all the earth making men to fall, and Prayers follow after, seeking to heal the hurt. Now him who will respect the daughters of Zeus, when they draw near, him they greatly benefit, and hear him when he prays; but if a man denies them and stubbornly refuses, then they go and beg Zeus, son of Cronos, that Blindness may follow that man so that he may fall and pay full recompense.

— Homer, Iliad 9.502–512; translation by A.T. Murray, revised by William F. Wyatt

In this allegory, Ate appears twice. First Ate causes damage to human beings. Then Prayers follow after Ate to repair her damage. But if the repair offered by Prayers is rejected (in this case if Achilles rejects Agamemnon's appeal) then Ate appears again as the punishment for such rejections. Ate both runs in front of Prayers, and when Prayers are refused, Ate also follows close behind. These two appearances can also be seen as examples of the Homeric Ate's dual role, as both cause and effect. Here Ate is both the cause of the original offense (Agamemnon's insult to Achilles), and the disastrous consequences which would (and will) follow from Achilles' refusal of Agamemnon's attempt to make amends.

==== Agamemnon's apology ====
In Book 19, Agamemnon attempts to excuse himself for having taken Briseis from Achilles, by blaming the "accursed" Ate (among others) for blinding his mind:

It is not I who am at fault, but Zeus and Fate and Erinys, that walks in darkness, since in the place of assembly they cast on my mind fierce blindness [atē] on that day when on my own authority I took from Achilles his prize. But what could I do? It is a god that brings all things to their end. Eldest daughter of Zeus is Ate who blinds all— accursed one; delicate are her feet, for it is not the ground that she touches, but she walks over the heads of men, bringing men to harm, and this one or that she ensnares.

— Homer, Iliad 19.86–94; translation by A.T. Murray, revised by William F. Wyatt

Phoenix's speech in Book 9 and Agamemnon's in Book 19 reveal different aspects of Ate's nature. The first emphasizes Ate's strength and speed, and her use by Zeus to punish (in this case, those who disregard Prayers). The second describes Ate's soft feet, walking not on the ground, but above the "heads of men", where, apparently unnoticed, she brings "men to harm".

To further excuse his conduct, Agamemnon tells the story—as an illustration of Ate's great power—of how:

[Ate] once even blinded Zeus, though men say that he is the greatest among men and gods;

— Homer, Iliad 19.95–96; translation by A.T. Murray, revised by William F. Wyatt

According to Agamemnon, when Alcmene was about to give birth to Zeus's son Heracles, Zeus, in his great pride, boasted that on that day would be born a man, of Zeus's blood, who would be king of the Argives. But Hera tricked Zeus into swearing an unbreakable oath such that whatever man, of Zeus's blood, born that day would be king. Then Hera delayed the birth of Heracles, and caused Eurystheus, the great-grandson of Zeus, to be born prematurely, and thus Heracles lost the birthright Zeus had intended for him. Zeus (like Agamemnon) blamed Ate for blinding him to Hera's trickery. As punishment, an enraged Zeus:

seized Ate by her bright-tressed head, angered in his mind, and swore a mighty oath that never again to Olympus and the starry heaven should Ate come, who blinds all. So said he, and whirling her in his hand flung her from the starry heaven, and quickly she came to the tilled fields of men. At thought of her would he ever groan when he saw his dear son in disgraceful toil at Eurystheus’ tasks.

— Homer, Iliad 19.126–133; translation by A.T. Murray, revised by William F. Wyatt

=== Hesiod ===
Hesiod presented Ate as one of the several offspring of Eris, all of whom were personifications representing some of the many harms which can arise out of discord and strife. Hesiod particular associates Ate with her sister Dysnomia (Lawlessness). While listing the children of Eris, he lists both on the same line (230) of his Theogony and says they are "much like one another".

In a passage in his Works and Days (213–285), Hesiod describes various relationships between several personifications, including Ate. The passage, which discusses the superiority of Dike (Justice) over Hybris, also mentions Eirene (Peace), who attends those who "heed" Dike (228), and Ate's brother Horkos (Oath), who "runs along side crooked judgements" (219). In particular Hesiod associates Ate with "war", which might refer to Ate's brothers, the Machai (Wars), and her sister Limos (Famine) as all being punishments for those who "foster" Hybris:

give heed to Justice [Dike] and do not foster Outrageousness [Hybris] ... [since for those who do] far-seeing Zeus never marks out painful war; nor does famine [limos] attend straight-judging men, nor calamity [atē], but they share out in festivities the fruits of the labors they care for.

— Hesiod, Works and Days 213–231; translation by Glenn W. Most

=== Aeschylus ===
Among the tragic poets, the use of atē and (thus) Ate is somewhat different than it is in the Iliad. In both Homer and tragedy, atē can be used to mean the original delusion as well as the resulting destruction. However, while Homer was more focused on the former, tragedy became more focused on the latter. In tragedy, atē came to be less associated with internal damage: a damaged mind, and more with external damage: ruin, disaster, destruction. Here, Ate can be seen as an avenger of evil actions and a just punisher of evil actors, similar to Nemesis and the Erinyes (Furies).

Ate was particularly prominent in the plays of Aeschylus, and less so in the later tragedians such as Euripides, where the idea of Dike (Justice) becomes more fully developed. Personified Ate appears several times in Aeschylus' tragedy Agamemnon, where she is called "scheming", and made the mother of an "unendurable child", the "miserable" Peitho (Temptation). Aeschylus also associates Ate with divine retribution: Zeus' punishment inflicted on Troy for Paris's abduction of Helen. In a long speech about Helen, the Chorus likens her to a lion cub raised as a loved and loving pet which ends up savagely killing those who raised it, the cub (and by extension Helen) being reared, by divine intent, as a "priest" of Ate. The Chorus goes on to describe Ate as:

the deity with whom none can war or fight,
the unholy arrogance
of Ruin [Ate], black for the house

— Aeschylus, Agamemnon 769–771; translation by Alan H. Sommerstein

In the final scene of the play, Clytemnestra, with bloody sword and clothes, emerges from the palace to reveal that she has killed her husband Agamemnon, in retribution for his having killed their daughter Iphigenia. She describes her act as the "Justice" [Dike] due for the killing of Iphigenia, and that she was aided by "Ruin" [Ate] and "Fury" [Eryns].

In Aeschylus's Libation Bearers, Ate is explicitly said to be the agent of Zeus' justice:

Zeus, Zeus, who sends up from below
avenging ruin [Ate] soon or late,
against audacious, reckless
human violence!

— Aeschylus, Libation Bearers, 382–385; translation by Alan H. Sommerstein

Ate also occurs twice in Aeschylus' Persians. At the beginning of the play, the Chorus of Persian elders voice their foreboding on their war with Greece:

But what mortal man can escape
the guileful deception of a god?
...
For Ruin [Ate] begins by fawning on a man in a friendly way
and leads him astray into her net,
from which it is impossible for a mortal to escape and flee.

— Aeschylus, Persians 93–101; translation by Alan H. Sommerstein

Ate here represents both cause and effect. She begins by deceiving and misleading mortals, and ends by the mortals being caught in her inescapable net. While, at the end of the play, Aeschylus returns to his typical focus of Ate as disastrous consequence, having the Chorus lament their devastating defeat: "What an evil eye Ruin [Ate] has cast upon us!"

At the end of the battle in Aeschylus's Seven Against Thebes, Ate's "trophy" stands at the gate of Thebes where both of Orestes' sons have died killing each other in battle, representing the final victory of the "powers of destruction" over the cursed House of Laius.

=== Other ===
There are several other references to Ate in ancient Greek sources. A fragment attributed to one of the two lyric poets of early sixth-century Lesbos: Sappho or Alcaeus, refers to Ate as "insatiable". A fragment of the fifth-century BC philosopher Empedocles refers to the "meadow of Ate", which probably signifies the mortal world.

The fifth-century BC Greek epic poet Panyassis associated Ate (along with Hybris, the personification of insolence) with excessive drinking. According to Panyassis, the first round of wine, is for the Graces (the goddesses of beauty), Horae (the goddesses of good order), and Dionysus (the god of wine), while the second round, is for Aphrodite (goddess of love), and Dionysus again. But the third round is when "Hybris and Ate take their unlovely turn", bringing "good hospitality to a bad end".

In his third-century BC epic poem the Argonautica, about the adventures of Jason and the Argonauts, Apollonius of Rhodes has Hera say that "even the gods are sometimes visited by Ate". In Nonnus's fifth-century AD epic poem Dionysiaca, in order to gratify Hera, Ate persuades the boy Ampelus whom Dionysus passionately loves, to impress Dionysus by riding on a bull from which Ampelus subsequently falls and breaks his neck. In Quintus Smyrnaeus's in his third-century AD Posthomerica, associates Ate with the punishment of insolence:

Lesser men should beware of insulting their kings either face-to-face or behind their backs: the result is terrible wrath. Justice does exist: Ruin [Ate], who brings mortals misery upon misery, punishes an insolent tongue.

— Quintus Smyrnaeus, Posthomerica 1.751–754; translation by Neil Hopkinson

== Shakespeare ==
In the play Julius Caesar, Shakespeare introduces the goddess Ate as an invocation of vengeance and menace. Mark Antony, lamenting Caesar's murder, envisions:

And Caesar's spirit, raging for revenge,
With Ate by his side come hot from hell,
Shall in these confines with a monarch's voice
Cry "Havoc!" and let slip the dogs of war,

Shakespeare also mentions her in the play Much Ado About Nothing, when Benedick says, referring to Beatrice,

Come, talk not of her. You shall find her the
infernal Ate in good apparel.

So too, in King John, Shakespeare refers to Queen Eleanor as "An Ate stirring him [John] to blood and strife", and, in Love's Labour's Lost, Birone jeers "Pompey is moved. More Ates, more Ates! stir them on, stir them on!"

== See also ==
- Folly (allegory)
- 111 Ate, a main-belt asteroid
