= Folly (allegory) =

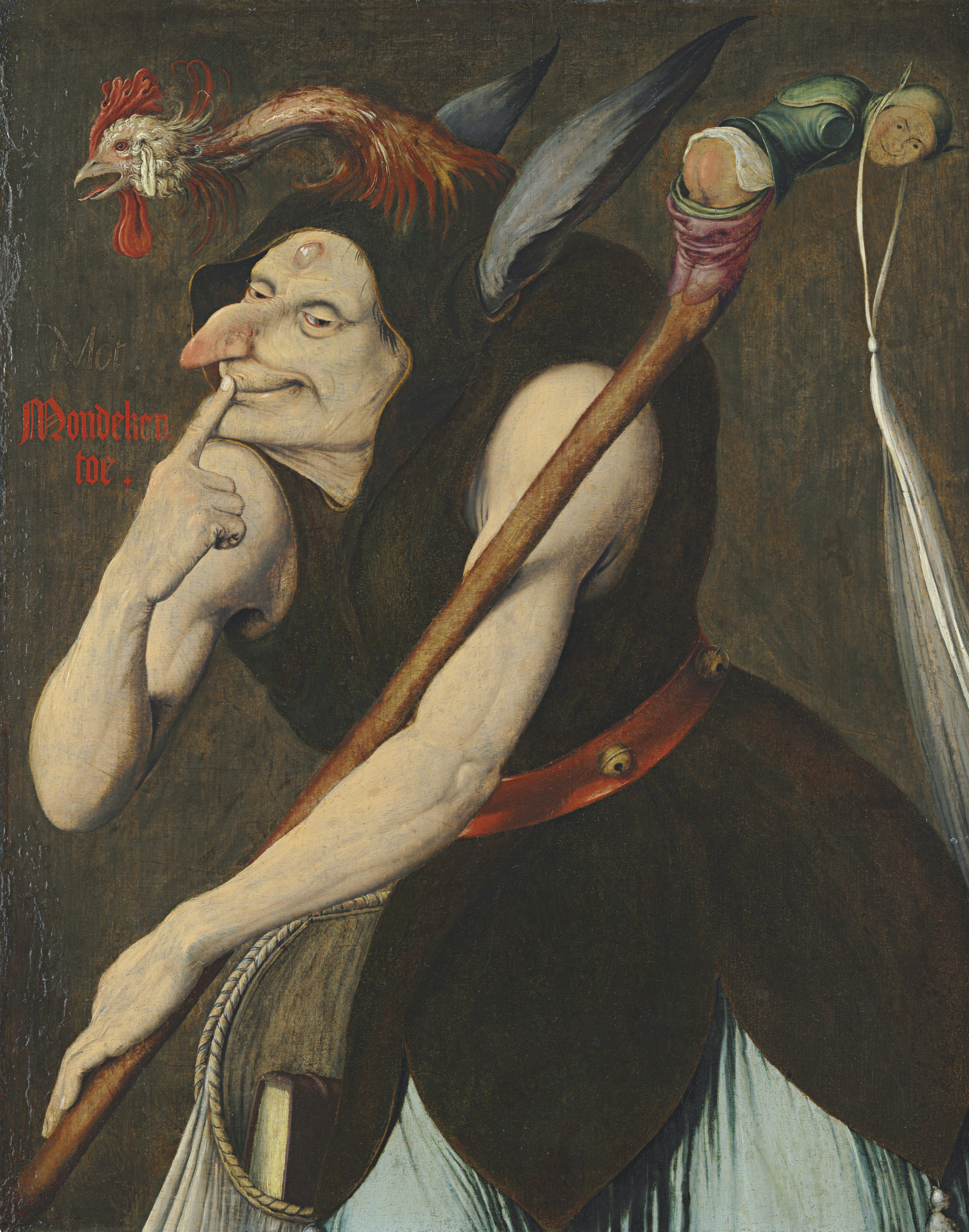
An Allegory of Folly (early 16th century) by Quentin Matsys

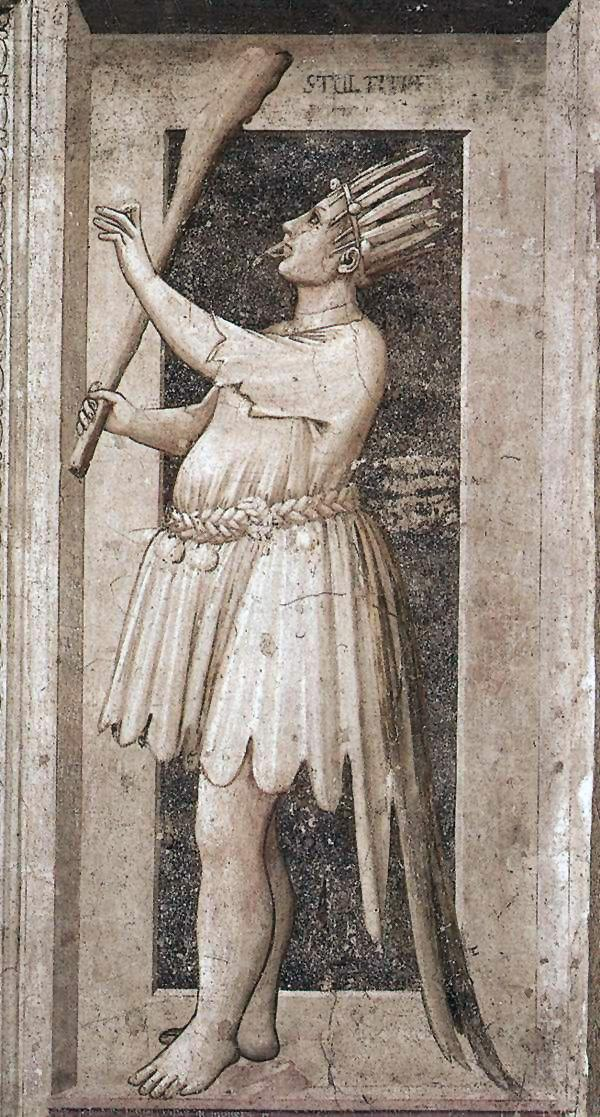
A medieval allegory of Folly, painted by Giotto.

Folly (Latin: Moria) was a common allegorical figure in medieval morality plays and in allegorical artwork through the Renaissance. The depiction is generally of a young man, often similar in appearance to a jester or the tarot card, The Fool. In contrast to the many obvious classical allusions in such works, the depictions owe little to the Greek goddess Atë.

In drama, the character tempts the protagonist into foolish action, successfully or not. In an allegorical painting, the figure may be counterpoised to Prudence, representing a choice, or alone, representing the unwisdom of the actors in the painting.

== See also ==
- In Praise of Folly; the article contains an allegoric drawing of Folly
- Venus, Cupid, Folly and Time, allegorical painting by Agnolo Bronzino
