= Litae =

Ancient Greek divinities with moral function, daughters of Zeus

The Litae
- Personifications of Prayers
- Abode: Mount Olympus (possibly)

Genealogy
- Parents: Zeus
- Siblings: Atë

In Greek mythology, Litae (/ˈlaɪtiː/; Ancient Greek: Λιταί means 'prayers') were personifications of prayers offered up in repentance and were ministers of the god Zeus. They were described as hobbling, old women. Their opposite number was Ate, the spirit of delusion and folly, in whose wake they followed.

== Family ==
Homer describes them as kourai "maidens" of Zeus rather than thugateres "daughters", so it is not clear if they were his literal daughters.

This is supported by Quintus Smyrnaeus, who attests that they were the children of the king of the gods:

(Paris addresses his former wife Oinone): 'Remember not those pangs of jealousy, nor leave me by a cruel doom to die low fallen at thy feet! This should offend the Litai (Prayers), the daughters of the Thunderer Zeus, whose anger followeth unrelenting pride with vengeance, and the Erinnys (Fury) executes their wrath.'

== Mythology ==
They appear in Homer's Iliad in Book 9 as the lame and wrinkled daughters of Zeus who follow after Zeus' exiled daughter Atë ("Folly") as healers but who cannot keep up with the fast-running Atë. They bring great advantage to those who venerate them, but if someone dishonors them, they go to Zeus and ask that Atë be sent against that person.

The very immortals can be moved; their virtue and honour and strength are greater than ours are, and yet with sacrifices and offerings for endearment, with libations and with savour men turn back even the immortals in supplication, when any man does wrong and transgresses. For there are also Litai (Spirits of Prayer), the daughters (kourai) of great Zeus, and they are lame of their feet, and wrinkled, and cast their eyes sidelong, who toil on their way left far behind by the spirit of Ruin (Ate): but she, Ate (Ruin), is strong and sound on her feet, and therefore far outruns all Litai (Prayers), and wins into every country to force men astray; and the Litai (Prayers) follow as healers after her. If a man venerates these daughters of Zeus as they draw near, such a man they bring great advantage, and hear his entreaty; but if a man shall deny them, and stubbornly with a harsh word refuse, they go to Zeus, son of Kronos, in supplication that Ate (Ruin) may over take this man, that he be hurt, and punished. So Akhilleus: grant, you also, that Zeus' daughters be given their honour, which, lordly though they be, curbs the will of others.

This is an obvious allegory on the supposed power of prayer to mitigate the misfortunes into which one's folly has led one.
