= Edward Topsell =

English cleric and author (died 1625)

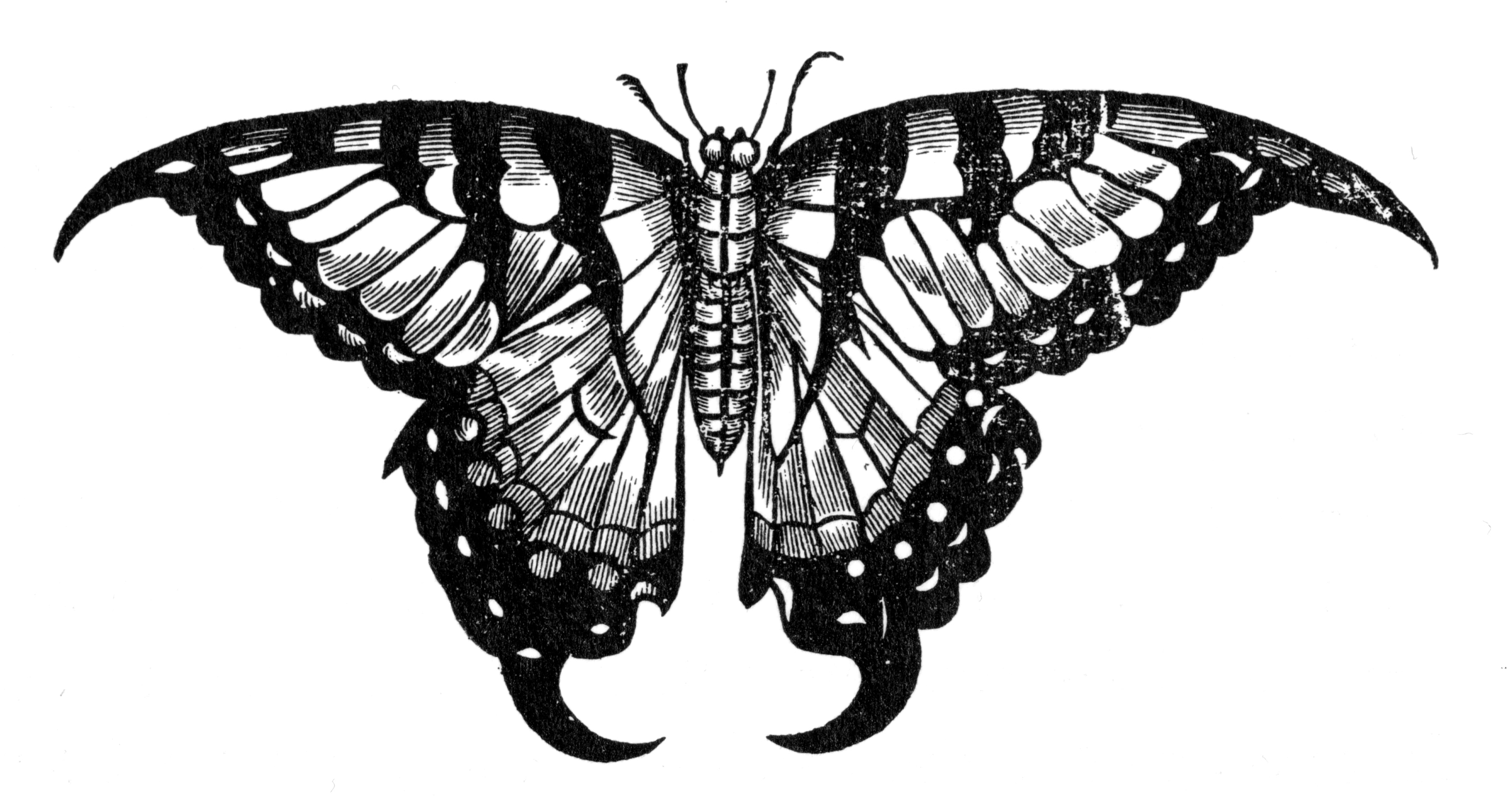
An image of Papilio machaon, from Topsell's History

Edward Topsell (circa 1572 – 1625) was an English cleric and author best remembered for his bestiary.

Topsell was born and educated in Sevenoaks, Kent. He attended Christ's College, Cambridge, earned his B.A. and probably an M.A., as well, before beginning a career in the Church of England. He served as the first rector of East Hoathly in Sussex, and subsequently became the perpetual curate of St Botolph's, Aldersgate (1604). He was the author of books on religious and moral themes, including The Reward of Religion (1596) and Time's Lamentation (1599), among others.

Topsell's The History of Four-footed Beasts (1607) and The History of Serpents (1608), both published by William Jaggard, were reprinted together as The History of Four-Footed Beasts and Serpents in 1658. An 1100-page treatise on zoology, Topsell's work repeats ancient and fantastic legends about actual animals, as well as reports of mythical animals. Topsell, not a naturalist himself, relied on earlier authorities, most notably the Historiae animalium of the Swiss scholar Conrad Gessner. "I would not have the Reader," Topsell writes, "... imagine I have ... related all that is ever said of these Beasts, but only [what] is said by many."

Topsell's work is remembered chiefly for its detailed and vigorous illustrations, including the famous image known as Dürer's Rhinoceros. The illustrations have been widely reproduced in many contexts, and Topsell's bestiary has been reprinted in various modern editions, usually in greatly reduced form.

== Superstitions about actual animals ==
Topsell, repeating ancient legends, assigns exotic attributes to actual animals. He writes, for example, that:

- True toads have a toadstone in their heads that protects people from poison.
- Weasels give birth through their ears.
- Lemmings graze in the clouds.
- Elephants worship the sun and the moon and become pregnant by chewing on mandrake.
- Apes are terrified of snails.

Of the procreation of mice, Topsell writes, it "is not only by copulation, but also nature worketh wonderfully in ingenduring them by earth."

== Fantastic animals ==
Relying on the authority of "sundry learned men", Topsell includes the Gorgon, the Sphinx, the Manticore, the Lamia, the Winged Dragon and the Unicorn. He does, however, express skepticism regarding the Hydra.

== Other quotations ==
"It is as necessary, or rather more necessary, for most men to know how to take mice, than how to take elephants."

== Gallery from The History of the Four-footed Beasts and Serpents, 1658 ==
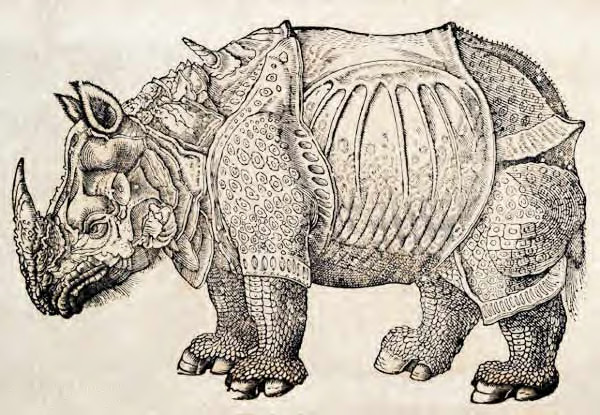
Rhinoceros woodcut

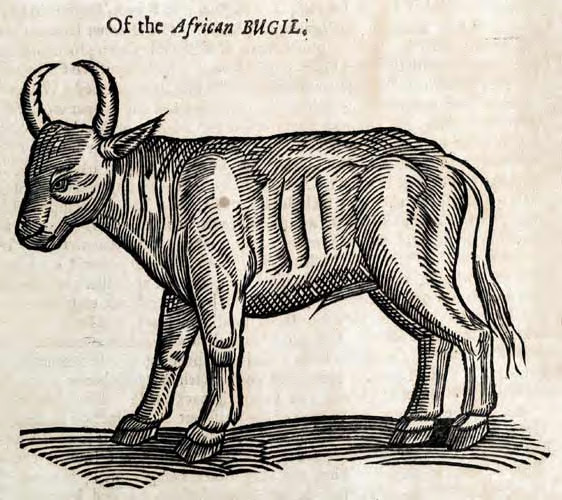
African Bugil-Cow woodcut

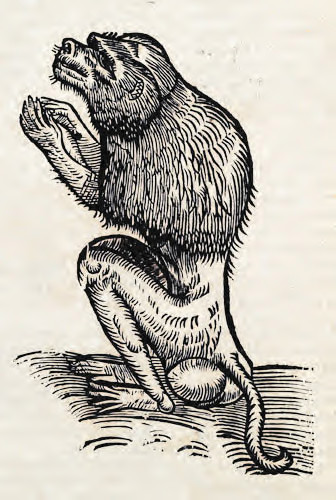
Baboon-Tartarine woodcut

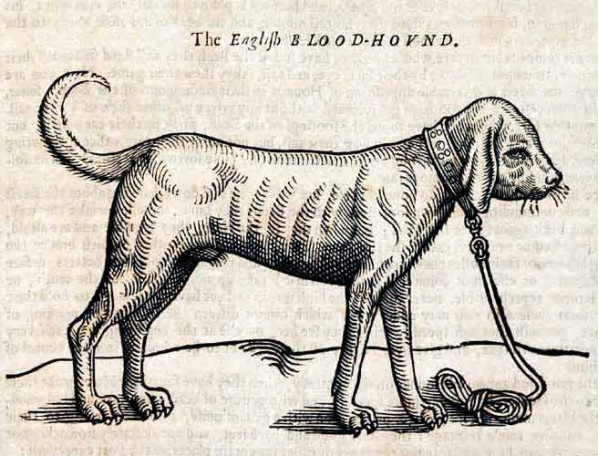
Bloodhound woodcut

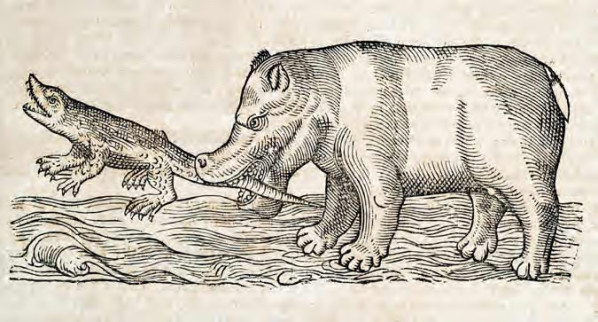
Hippopotamus woodcut

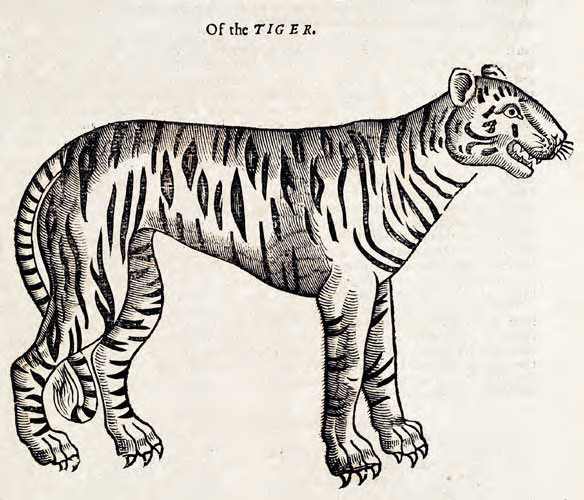
Tiger woodcut

== See also ==
- Apollonian and Dionysian

== Bibliography ==
- Auden, W. H.; Kronenberger, Louis (1966). The Viking Book of Aphorisms. New York: Viking Press.
- Topsell, Edward, ed. (1658). The history of four-footed beasts and serpents. London: E. Cotes.
