= Eusebeia =

Greek-language term

Eusebeia (Greek: εὐσέβεια from εὐσεβής "pious" from εὖ eu meaning "well", and σέβας sebas meaning "reverence", itself formed from seb- meaning sacred awe and reverence especially in actions) is a Greek word abundantly used in Greek philosophy as well as in Greek translations of texts of Indian religions and the Greek New Testament, meaning to perform the actions appropriate to the gods. The root seb- (σέβ-) is connected to danger and flight, and thus the sense of reverence originally described fear of the gods.

== Classical Greek usage ==
The word was used in Classical Greece where it meant behaving as tradition dictates in one's social relationships and towards the gods. One demonstrates eusebeia to the gods by performing the customary acts of respect (festivals, prayers, sacrifices, public devotions). By extension one honors the gods by showing proper respect to elders, masters, rulers and everything under the protection of the gods.

For Platonists, "eusebeia" meant "right conduct in regard to the gods". For the Stoics, "knowledge of how God should be worshiped". The Epicureans (in Vatican Saying 32) teach that a pious attitude towards a person of wisdom benefits the one who does the honoring.

In ancient Greek religion and myth the concept of eusebeia is anthropomorphized as the eu-daimon (good goddess, spirit) of piety, loyalty, duty and filial respect. According to one source, her husband is Nomos (Law), and their daughter is Dike, goddess of justice and fair judgment. In other tellings, Dike is the daughter of the god Zeus and/or the goddess Themis (Order). The Roman equivalent is Pietas. Her opposite was Dyssebeia, daimon of impiety.

The opposite of eusebeia is asebeia, which was considered a crime in Athens. The punishment could have been death or being exiled. Some philosophers, such as Anaxagoras, Protagoras and Socrates were accused and trialed by the Heliaia.

== In ancient India ==
The Indian emperor Ashoka in his 250 BCE Edicts used the word "eusebeia" as a Greek translation for the central Indian concept of "dharma" in the Kandahar Bilingual Rock Inscription.

== New Testament usage ==
The original Greek New Testament's "Eusebeia" enters other language versions of the New Testament in later writings, where it is typically translated as "godliness," a vague translation that reflects uncertainty about its relevant meaning in the New Testament. For example, "Divine power has granted to us everything pertaining to life and godliness (eusébeia), through the true (full, personal, experiential) knowledge of Him Who called us by His own glory and excellence" (2 Pet 1:3) Peter. As the following quotation from Bullinger demonstrates, interpreters adapt the meaning of eusebeia to fit the idea appropriate to Christian practice (and not on philological grounds):

The word εὐσέβεια as it is used in the Greek New Testament carries the meaning of "godliness", and is distinct from θρησκεία (thrēskeia), "religion". Eusebeia relates to real, true, vital, and spiritual relation with God, while thrēskeia relates to the outward acts of religious observances or ceremonies, which can be performed by the flesh. The English word "religion" was never used in the sense of true godliness. It always meant the outward forms of worship. In 1Ti 3:16, the Mystery, or secret connected with true Christianity as distinct from religion, it is the Genitive of relation. (This specific meaning occurs only in Act 3:12.)] This word arises in the Greek New Testament in 1 Tim 2:2, 1 Tim 3:16, 1 Tim 4:7, 1 Tim 4:8, 1 Tim 6:3, 1 Tim 6:5, 1 Tim 6:6, 1 Tim 6:11, 2 Tim 3:5, Tit 1:1, 2 Pt 1:3, 2 Pt 1:6, 2 Pt 1:7, 2 Pt 3:11.
