= Venus, Cupid, Folly and Time =

Painting by Agnolo Bronzino

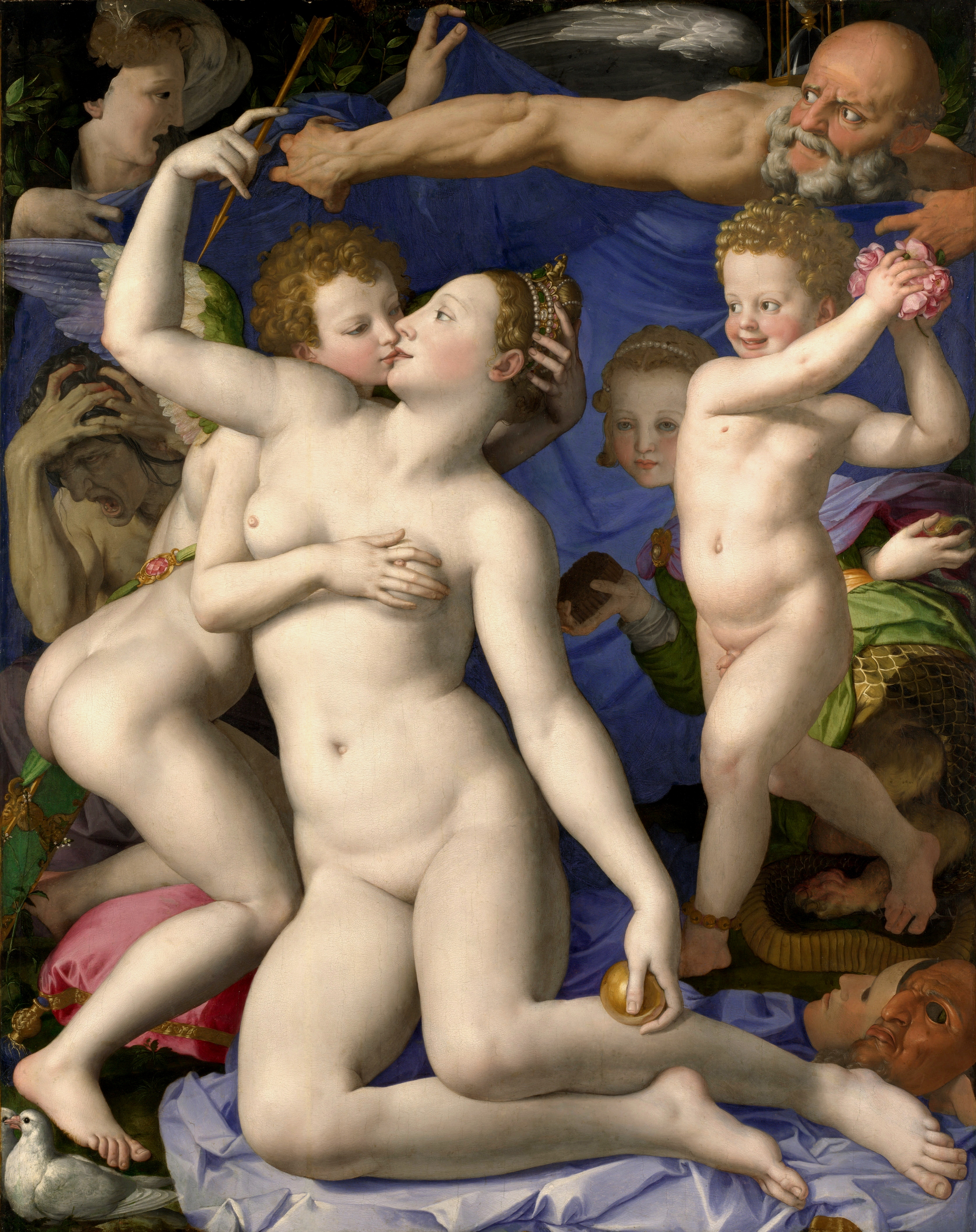
- Artist: Agnolo Bronzino
- Year: c. 1545
- Medium: Oil on wood
- Dimensions: 146.1 cm × 116.2 cm (57.5 in × 45.7 in)
- Location: National Gallery, London

Venus, Cupid, Folly and Time (also called An Allegory of Venus and Cupid and A Triumph of Venus) is an allegorical painting of about 1545 by the Florentine painter Agnolo Bronzino. It is now in the National Gallery, London. Scholars do not know for certain what the painting depicts.

The painting has come to be known as Venus, Cupid, Folly and Time, and it is generally agreed that these are the principal figures (with "Folly" representing this or the personification of a similar concept). Cupid and Venus kiss in the foreground, while the putto Folly prepares to shower them with rose petals. The bald Time, at the top, looks on and holds a cloth. The meaning of the other three figures and the interactions between them all is much less certain. The painting displays the ambivalence, eroticism, and obscure imagery that are characteristic of the Mannerist period, and of Bronzino's master Pontormo.

== Painting ==
The painting may have been commissioned by Cosimo I de' Medici, Grand Duke of Tuscany or by Francesco Salviati, to be presented by him as a gift to Francis I of France. Vasari wrote that a Bronzino painting, probably this one, was sent to King Francis, though he does not specify by whom: "He made a picture of singular beauty, which was sent to King Francis in France; in which was a nude Venus with Cupid kissing her, and on one side Pleasure and Play with other Loves; and on the other, Fraud, Jealousy, and other passions of love" (so not mentioning Time).

The erotic imagery would have appealed to the tastes prevalent in both the Medici and French courts at this time. The attention to texture and wealth is also consistent with Bronzino's aristocratic patronage. The painting was brought by Napoleon from Paris to Vienna, where in 1813, Johann Keglević gained possession of the painting from Franz Wenzel, Graf von Kaunitz-Rietberg. Since 1860 it has been in London.

The figure of Venus can be likened to a precious object (such as a marble statue) in a luxurious setting, desirable because of her unavailability. In this large, unusually cold composition, which is deliberately constructed on a counterpoint of opposing movements, the finest work is in the treatment of the faces. Bronzino, known above all as a portrait painter, painted several carefully drawn portraits of the Medici family.

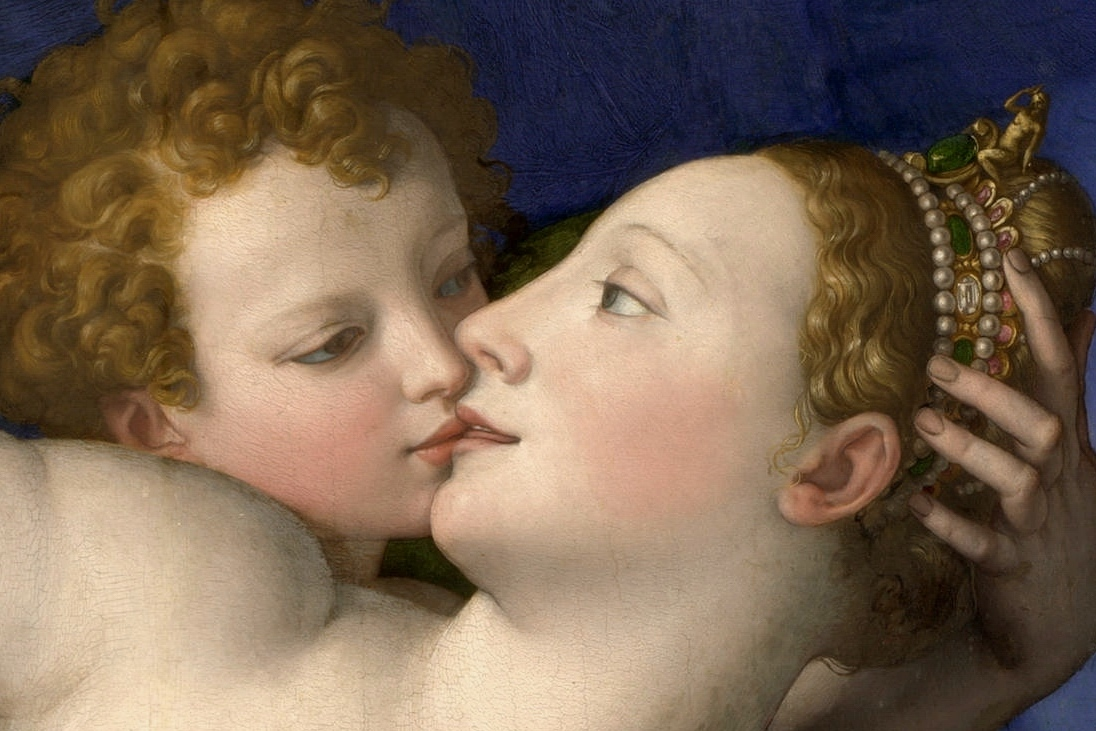
Venus and Cupid (detail)

== Scholarly debate ==
Crowded into the claustrophobic foreground of the painting are several figures whose identities have been the subject of extensive scholarly debate. At times it has also been called A Triumph of Venus. Its meaning, however, remains elusive. Cupid, along with his mother (Venus) and the nude putto, to the right, are all posed in a typical Mannerist figura serpentinata form.

The two central figures are recognisable as Venus and Cupid. For example, she holds the golden apple she won in the Judgement of Paris, while he sports the characteristic wings and quiver. Both figures are nude, illuminated in a radiant white light. Cupid fondles his mother's bare breast and kisses her lips. The putto to the right of Cupid and Venus, preparing to shower them with rose petals, is often identified as Folly. On closer inspection his right foot can be seen pierced by large rose thorn pieces—an event that has no bearing on his expression, which seems engrossed in the pleasure of the moment.

The bearded, bald figure to the upper right of the scene is believed to be Time, in view of the hourglass behind him. He sweeps his arm forcefully out to his right. Again, it is difficult to interpret his gesture with any certainty; it could be to prevent the figure at the far left of the picture from shielding the incestuous transgressions of Venus and the adolescent Cupid with the billowing blue fabric that provides a screen between the figures in the fore and background. Many scholars believe that his gesture seems to say "Time is fleeting, and you never know when it may be all over." The figure opposite Time, and also grasping at the drapery, is usually called Oblivion because of the lack of substance to his form—eyeless sockets and mask-like head. The mask-like face of this figure is echoed by the image of two actual masks in the lower right-hand corner.

The identity of the remaining figures is even more ambiguous. The desperate figure rending its hair has been called Jealousy—though some believe her to represent the ravaging effects of syphilis as he misses most of his teeth. The creature at the right-hand side behind the innocent-looking putto, with a girl's face and a concealed sphinx-like body, her head twisted at an unnatural angle, her hands reversed, extending a honeycomb with her right hand, and hiding behind her back a scorpion's barb at the end of her long serpentine tail, may represent Pleasure and Fraud. There is, however, no consensus on these identifications.

External videos
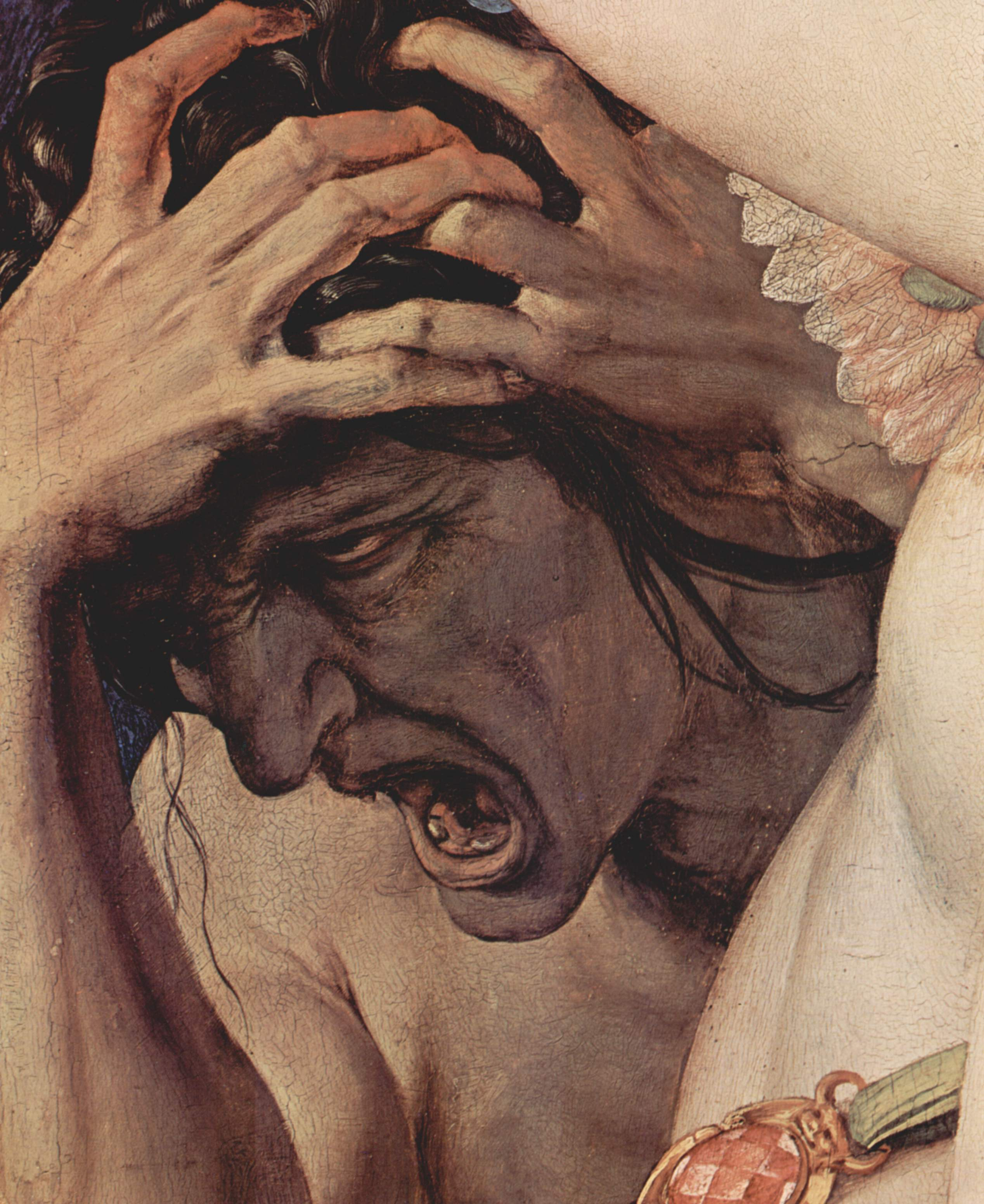
- Bronzino's An Allegory with Venus and Cupid, Smarthistory

== In popular culture ==
- The foot at the lower left corner is the source of the emblematic Monty Python Foot.
- The painting is discussed in Iris Murdoch's novel The Nice and the Good.
- The painting is discussed in Nell Irvin Painter's memoir Old in Art School.
- The painting is discussed in Robertson Davies' novel What's Bred in the Bone.
- The painting is mentioned in David Mitchell's The Bone Clocks.
- The painting is used in Simon Raven's The Survivors as a representation and incitement of the breakdown of Patricia Llewellyn.
- The painting is the title of Episode 22 of Switched at Birth.
- The name of the painting is also the name of a box set by the pop band The Divine Comedy.
- "Venus, Cupid, Folly, and Time" is the title of a short story by the American writer Peter Taylor.
