= Dyssebeia =

Greek mythological figure

In Greek mythology, Dyssebeia (pronounced [dyˈsːebeːa]; Ancient Greek: Δυσσέβεια) was the caco-daimon (evil goddess, spirit) and personification of impiety and ungodliness, as opposed to Eusebeia.

== Family ==
According to Aeschylus, Dyssebeia was the mother of Hybris.

"I have a timely word of advice: arrogance (hybris) is truly the child of impiety (dyssebia), but from health of soul comes happiness, dear to all, much prayed for."
