= Hybris (mythology) =

Personification of outrage in Greek mythology

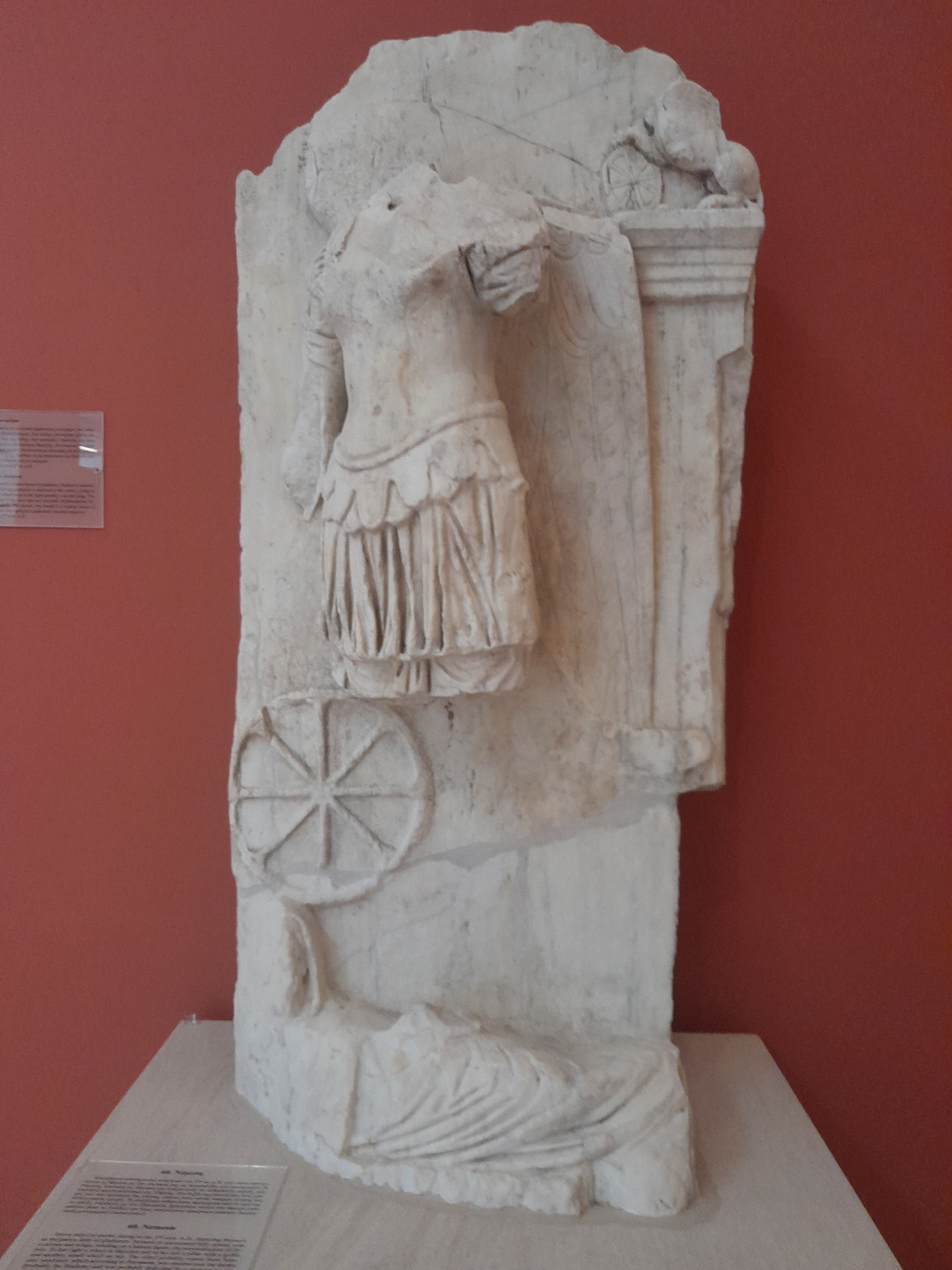
Votive relief of Nemesis as protector of gladiators treading on Hubris, 2nd-century AD, Archaeological Museum of Patras, in Greece

In Greek mythology, Hybris or Hubris (/ˈhaɪbrɪs/; Ancient Greek: Ὕβρις, romanized: Húbris, lit. 'wanton violence', 'insolence') was the spirit and personification of insolence. She embodied the manifestation of excessive arrogance leading to the defiance of the natural order and disrespect of the gods, which in turn resulted in divine retribution.

== Mythology ==
Aeschylus says that Dyssebeia is the mother of Hybris. According to the mythographer Apollodorus, the god Apollo "learned the art of prophecy from Pan, the son of Zeus and Hybris (Ὕβρεως)". Whether this Pan equates to Pan, the god of shepherds and flocks, who was usually said to be the son of Hermes, remains unclear.
