= Lady Justice =

Personification of justice

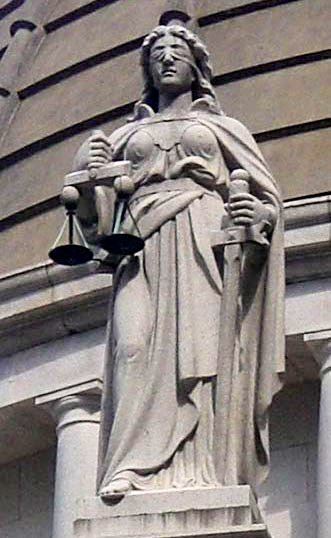
Statue of Lady Justice blindfolded and holding a balance and a sword, outside the Court of Final Appeal, Hong Kong

Lady Justice (Latin: Iustitia) is an allegorical personification of the moral force in judicial systems. Her attributes are scales, a sword and sometimes a blindfold. She often appears as a pair with Prudentia.

Lady Justice originates from the personification of Justice in ancient Roman art known as Iustitia or Justitia, who is equivalent to the Greek goddess Themis.

== The goddess Justitia ==
The origin of Lady Justice was Justitia, the goddess of Justice within Roman mythology. Justitia was introduced by emperor Augustus, and was thus not a very old deity in the Roman pantheon.

Justice was one of the virtues celebrated by emperor Augustus in his clipeus virtutis, and a temple of Justitia was established in Rome by emperor Tiberius. Justitia became a symbol for the virtue of justice with which every emperor wished to associate his regime; emperor Vespasian minted coins with the image of the goddess seated on a throne called Iustitia Augusta, and many emperors after him used the image of the goddess to proclaim themselves protectors of justice.

Though formally called a goddess with her own temple and cult shrine in Rome, it appears that she was from the onset viewed more as an artistic symbolic personification rather than as an actual deity with religious significance.

=== Scales ===
The god Anubis weighing a heart against the feather of Maat.

The symbol of the balance scales to represent the concept of justice dates back to Ancient Egypt. According to 'Spell 25' of the Books of the Dead, the jackal-headed god of funerary rites Anubis would weight the deceased person's heart against the "feather of truth" of the goddess Maat, who represented the ideals of truth, fairness, honesty and justice. With a good heart, the deceased would enter the afterlife; otherwise, they would be fed to Ammit, a crocodile-headed monster.

The symbol of the scales of justice was later adopted by the Greeks and then the Romans. Since then, "in the global system of visual symbols, it is a rare example of a symbol that completely lacks ambiguity."

Lady Justice is often depicted with a set of scales, typically suspended from one hand, upon which she balances the relative substance and value (i.e. the 'weight') of the available evidence and arguments on both sides of any bilateral dispute. The scales can therefore 'tip in favour' of either side, and justice, in terms of the metaphor, can be enacted upon seeing the result.

The Greek goddess Dike is depicted holding a set of scales:

If some god had been holding level the balance of Dike (Justice).

— Bacchylides, Fragment 5 (trans. Campbell, Vol. Greek Lyric IV) (Greek lyric c. 5th B.C.)

=== Blindfold ===
Since the 16th century, Lady Justice has often been depicted wearing a blindfold. The blindfold was originally a satirical addition intended to show Justice as blind to the injustice carried on before her, but it has been reinterpreted over time and is now understood to represent impartiality, the ideal that justice should be applied without regard to wealth, power, or other status. The earliest Roman coins depicted Justitia with the sword in one hand and the scale in the other, but with her eyes uncovered. Justitia was only commonly represented as "blind" since the middle of the 16th century. The first known representation of blind Justice is Hans Gieng's 1543 statue on the Gerechtigkeitsbrunnen (Fountain of Justice) in Bern.

Instead of using the Janus approach, many sculptures simply leave out the blindfold altogether. For example, atop the Old Bailey courthouse in London, a statue of Lady Justice stands without a blindfold; the courthouse brochures explain that this is because Lady Justice was originally not blindfolded, and because her "maidenly form" is supposed to guarantee her impartiality which renders the blindfold redundant. Another variation is to depict a blindfolded Lady Justice as a human scale, weighing competing claims in each hand. An example of this can be seen at the Shelby County Courthouse in Memphis, Tennessee.

=== Sword ===
The sword represented authority in ancient times, and conveys the idea that justice can be swift and final.

=== No blindfold and no sword ===
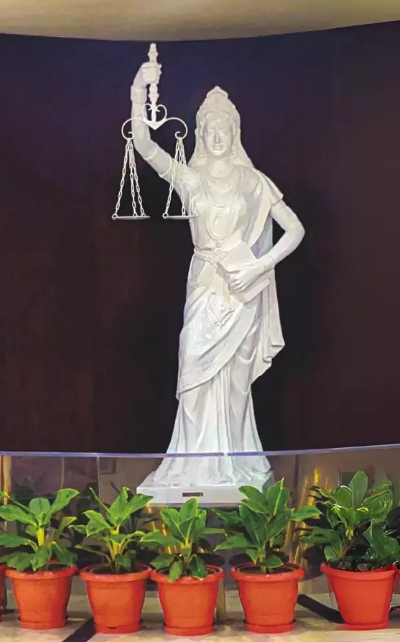
Nyay Devi, at the Judges' Library in Supreme Court of India

In October 2024, the Supreme Court of India announced and inaugurated the Nyay Devi, a new template for statues of Lady Justice for use in India. Henceforth, the blindfold will not be used and the sword is replaced by a book representing the constitution. She wears a sari and blouse, with a crown on her head, a bindi on her forehead, bangles on her wrists, and Indian jewellery adorning her ears and neck. Announcing the change, the Chief Justice of India DY Chandrachud declared that "the law is not blind, it sees everyone equally". The removal of sword also symbolizes India's shift to new criminal laws focusing on Nyay (justice) rather than punishments or retributions.

=== Toga ===
The Greco-Roman garment symbolizes the status of the philosophical attitude that embodies justice.

== In art ==
=== Sculpture ===
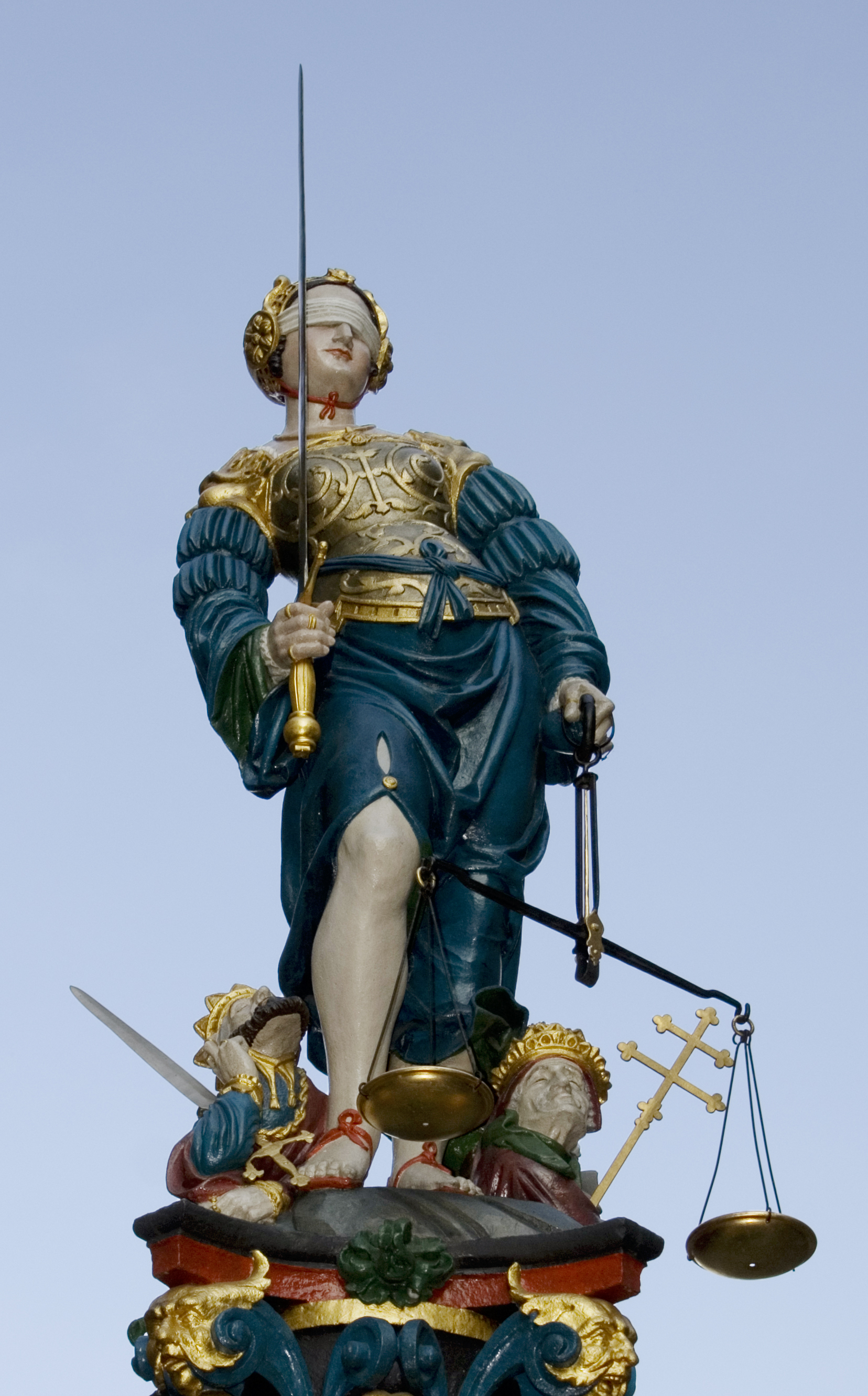
Lady Justice with sword, scales and blindfold on the Gerechtigkeitsbrunnen in Bern, Switzerland, 1543

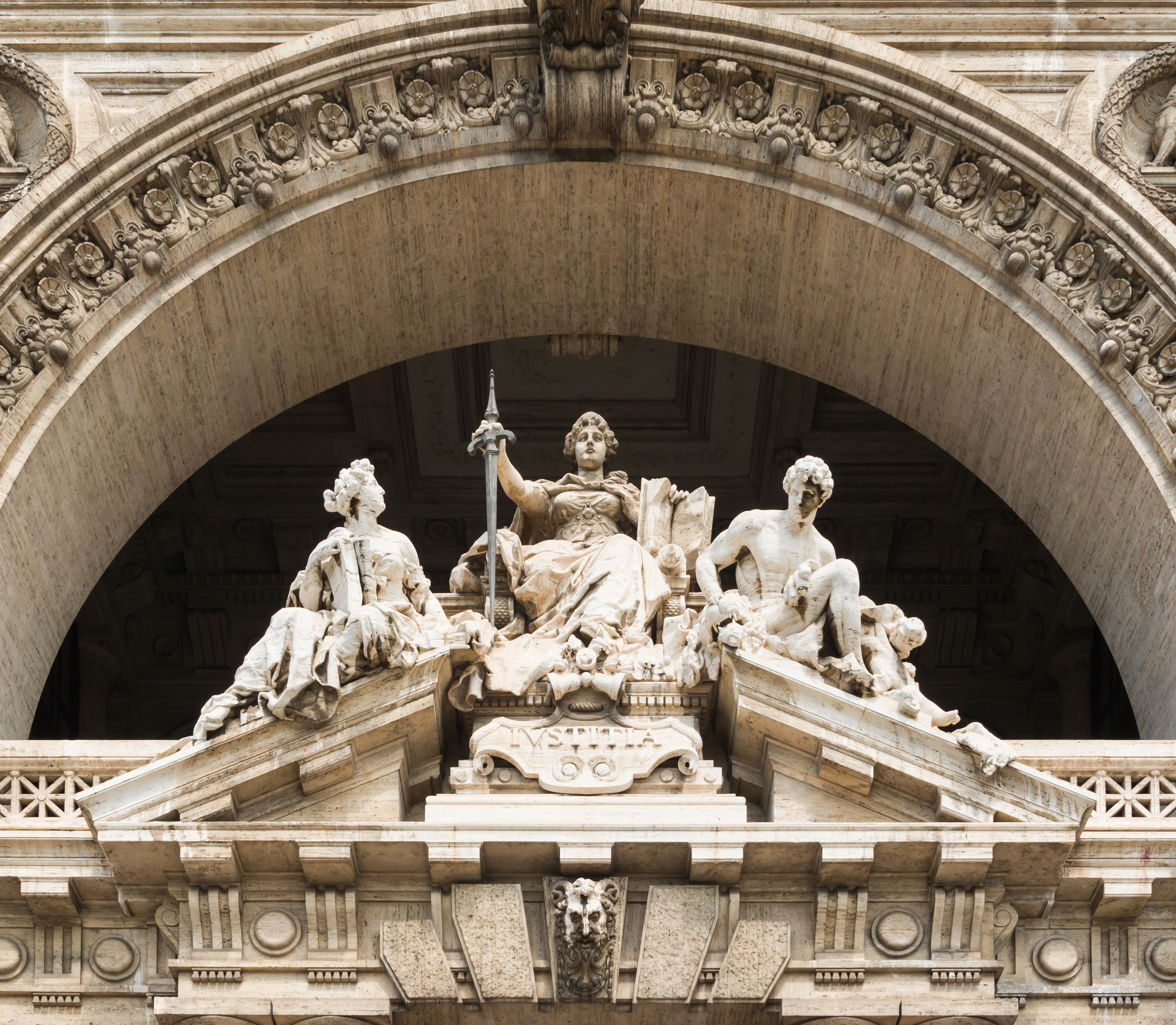
Lady Justice seated at the entrance of The Palace of Justice, Rome, Italy

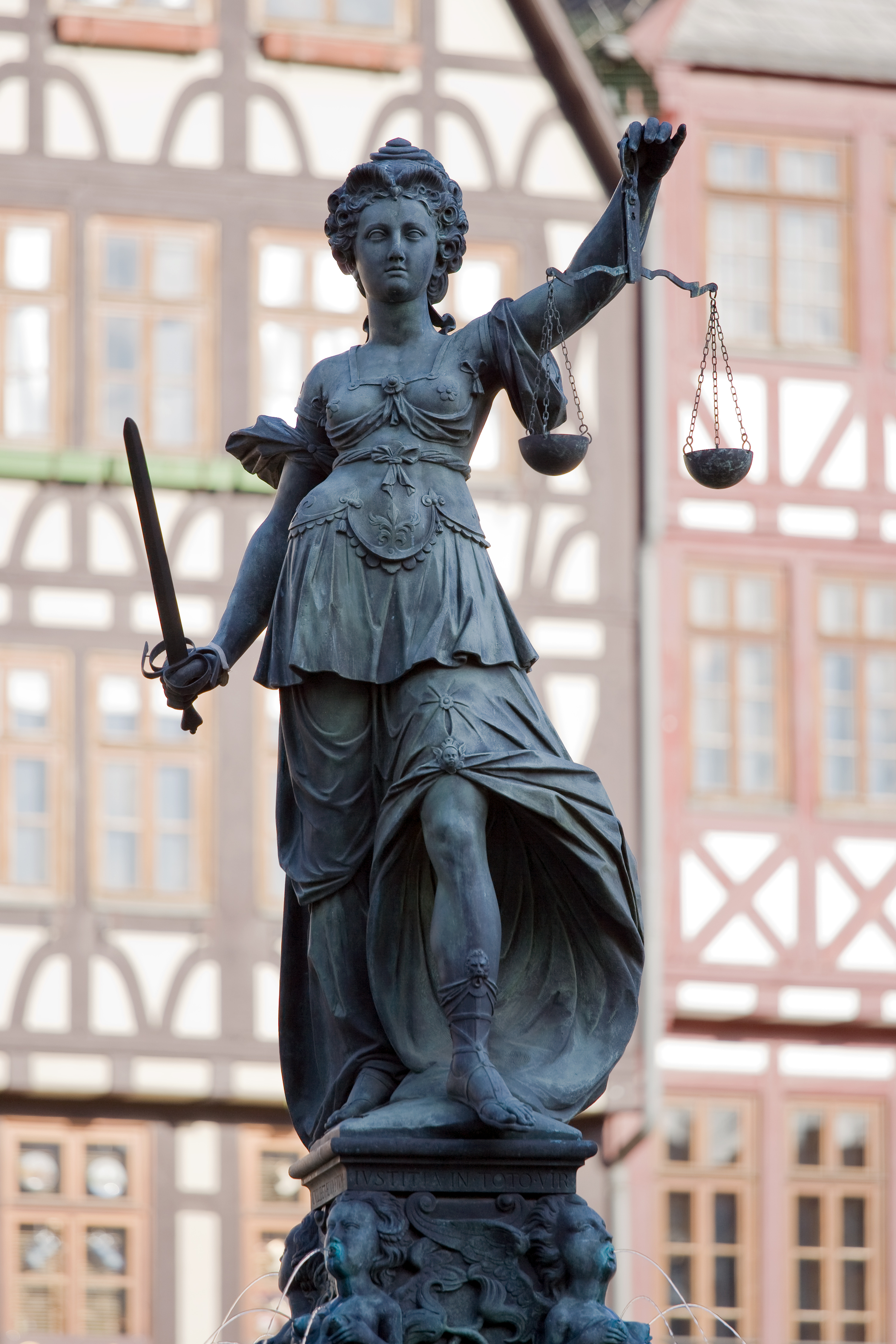
Sculpture of Lady Justice on the Gerechtigkeitsbrunnen in Frankfurt, Germany

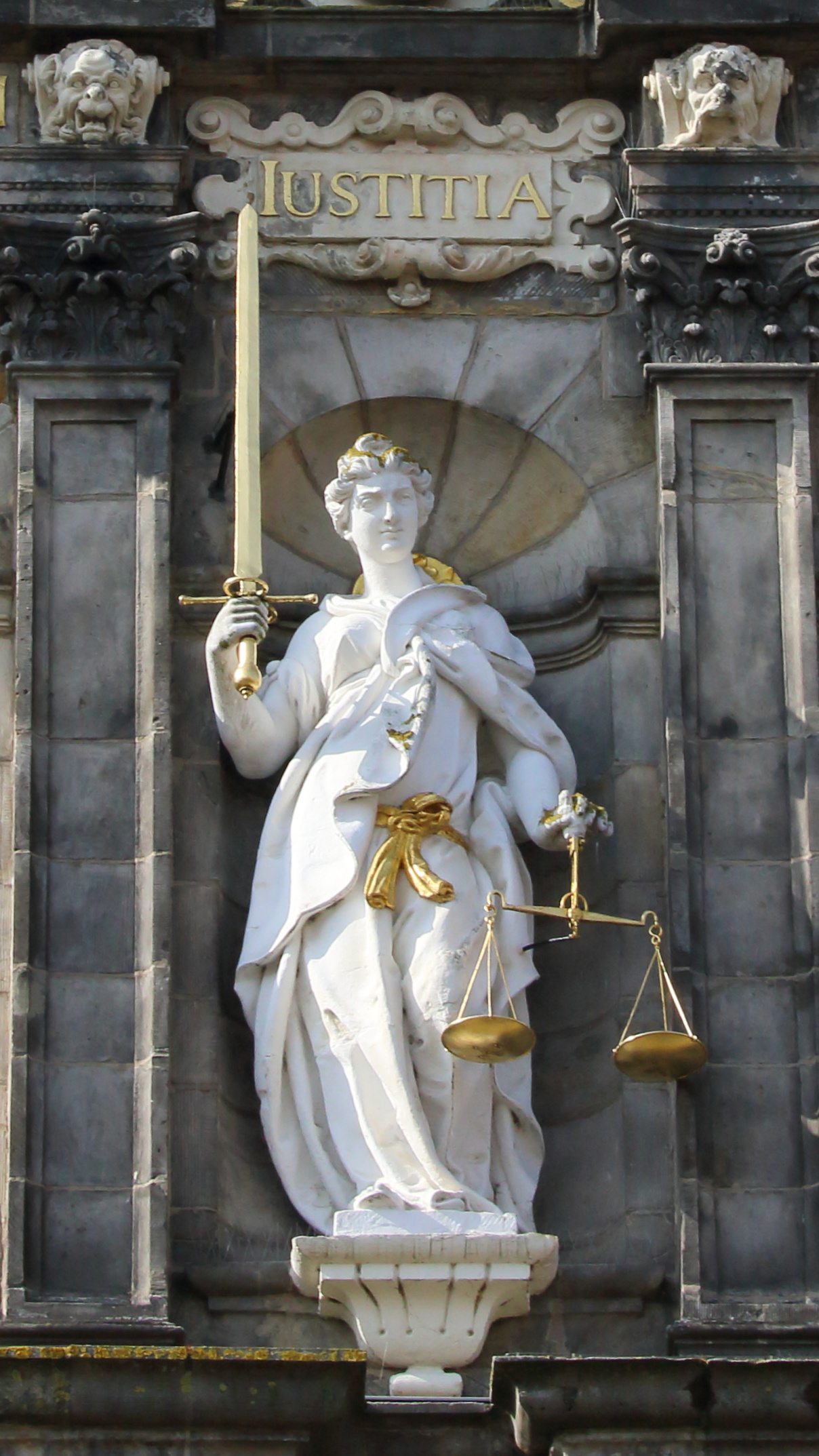
Justitia on the Delft City Hall, the Netherlands

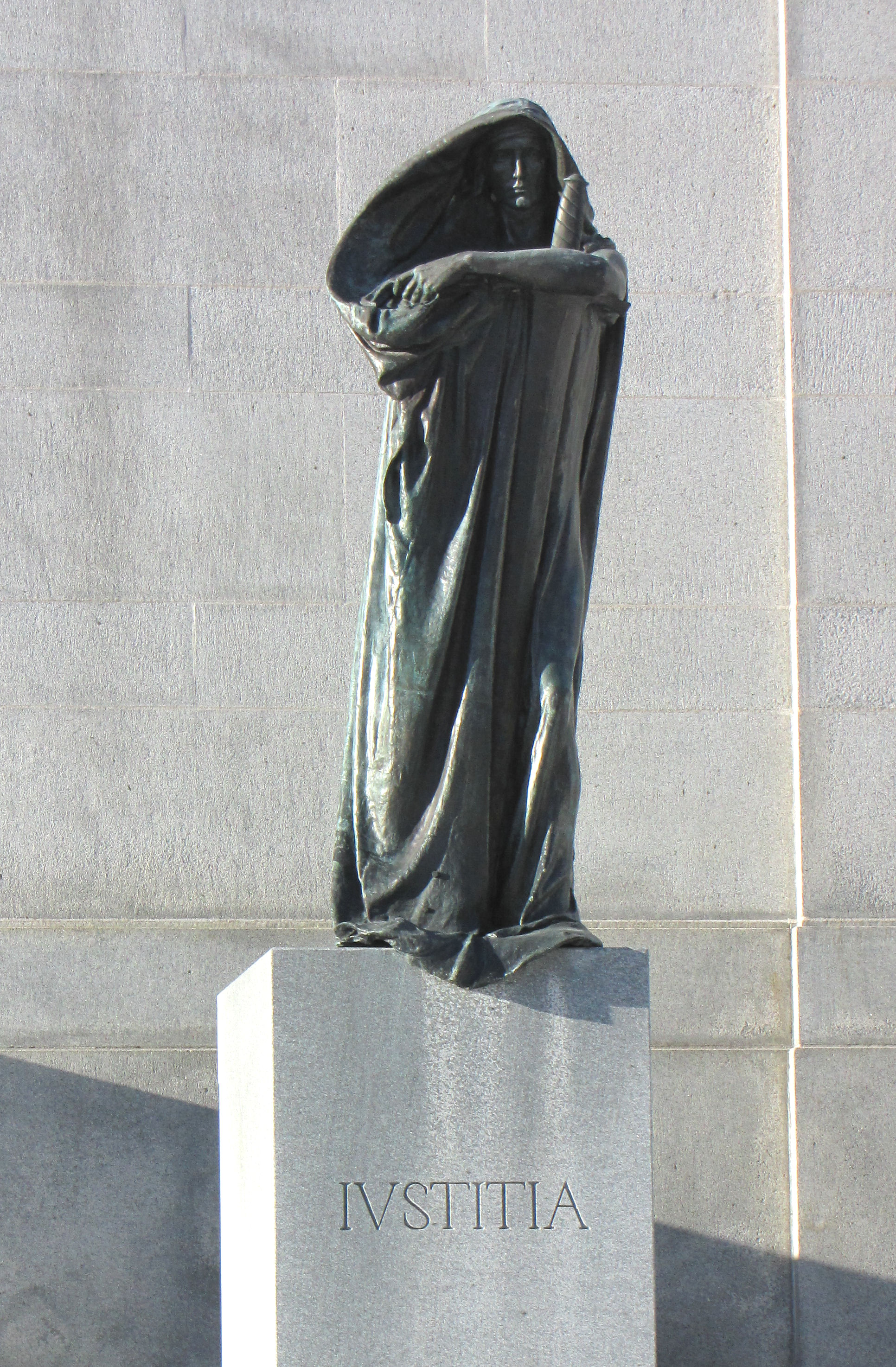
Justitia, outside the Supreme Court of Canada, Ottawa, Ontario, Canada

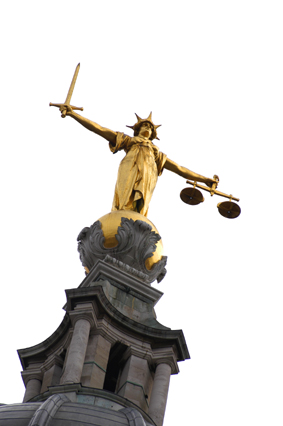
The Central Criminal Court or Old Bailey, London, UK

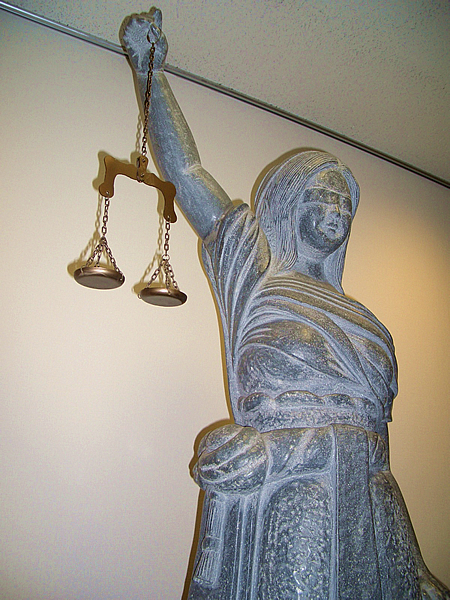
Themis, Itojyuku, Shibuya-ku, Japan

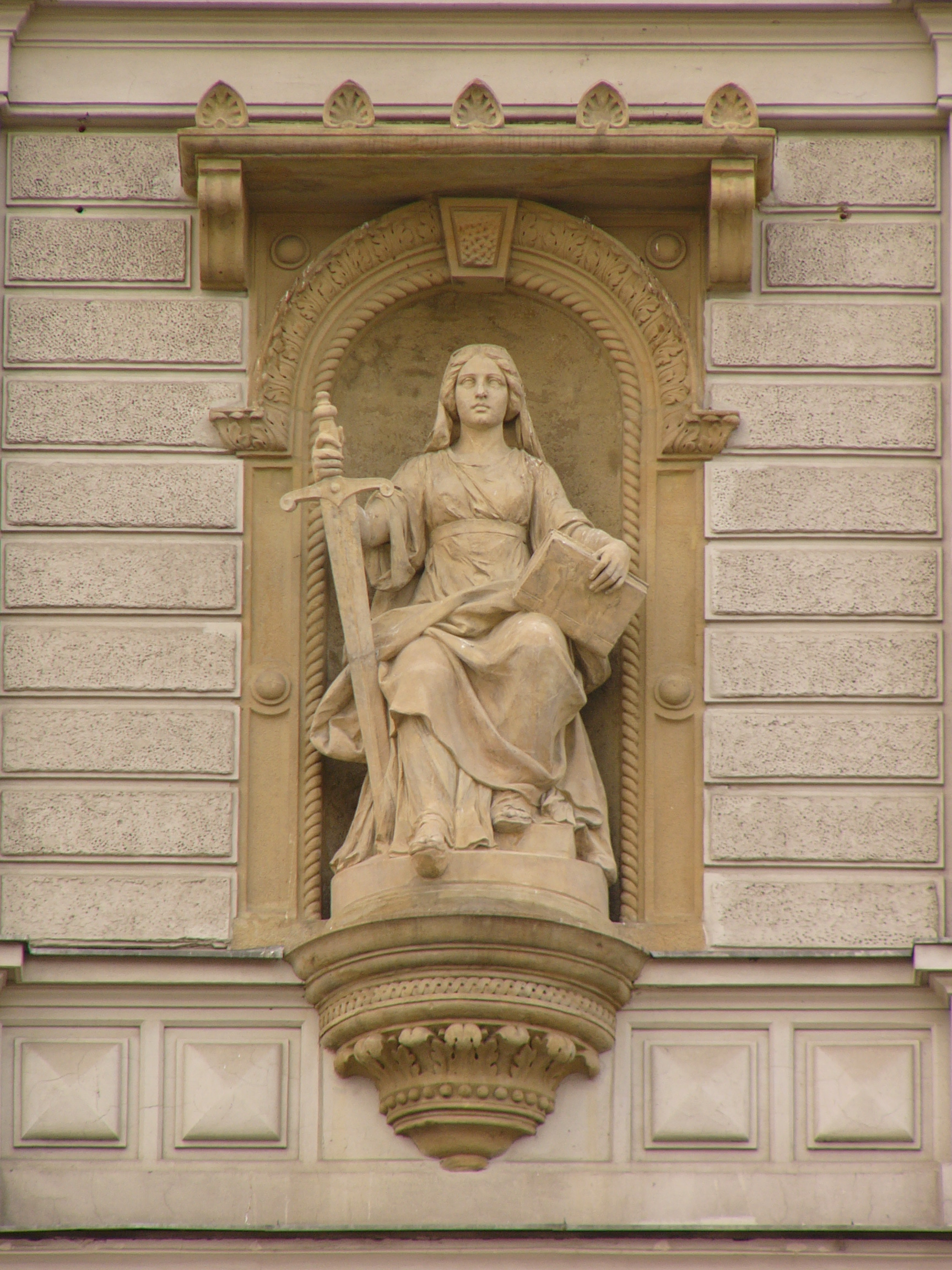
19th-century sculpture of the Power of Law at Olomouc, Czech Republic—lacks the blindfold and scales of Justice, replacing the latter with a book

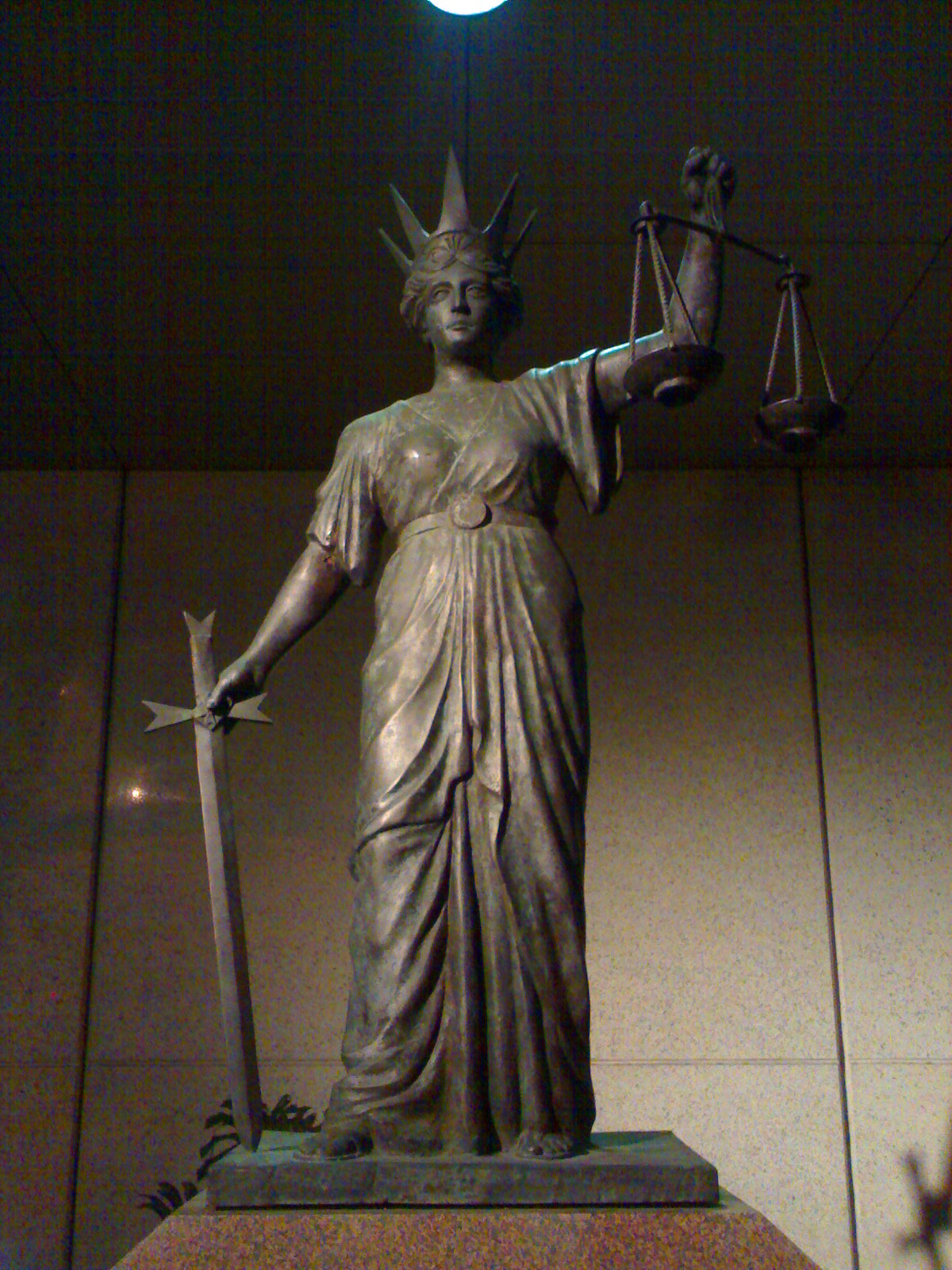
Themis, outside the Supreme Court of Queensland, Brisbane, Queensland, Australia

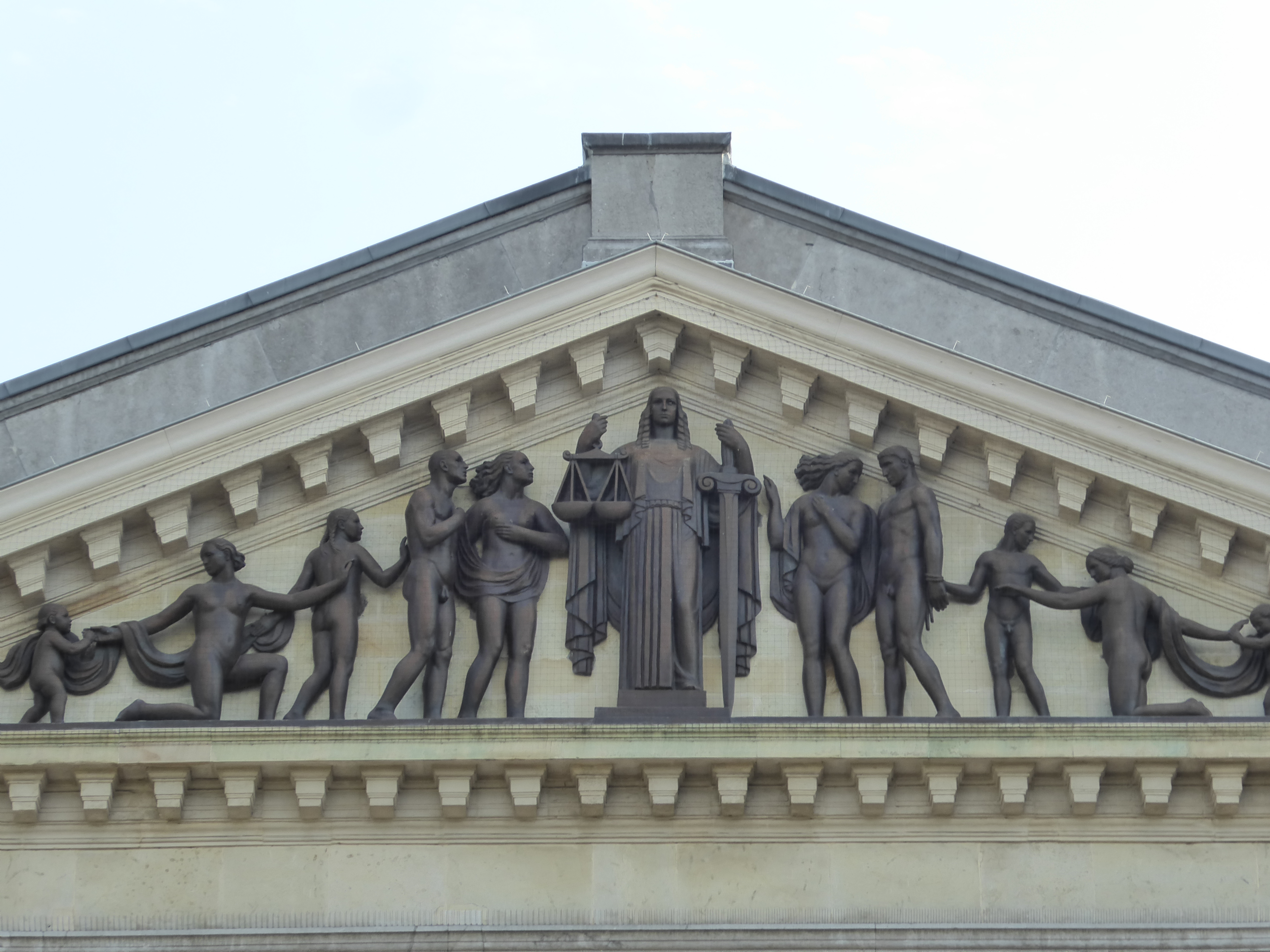
Themis, Old courthouse, Ghent, Belgium

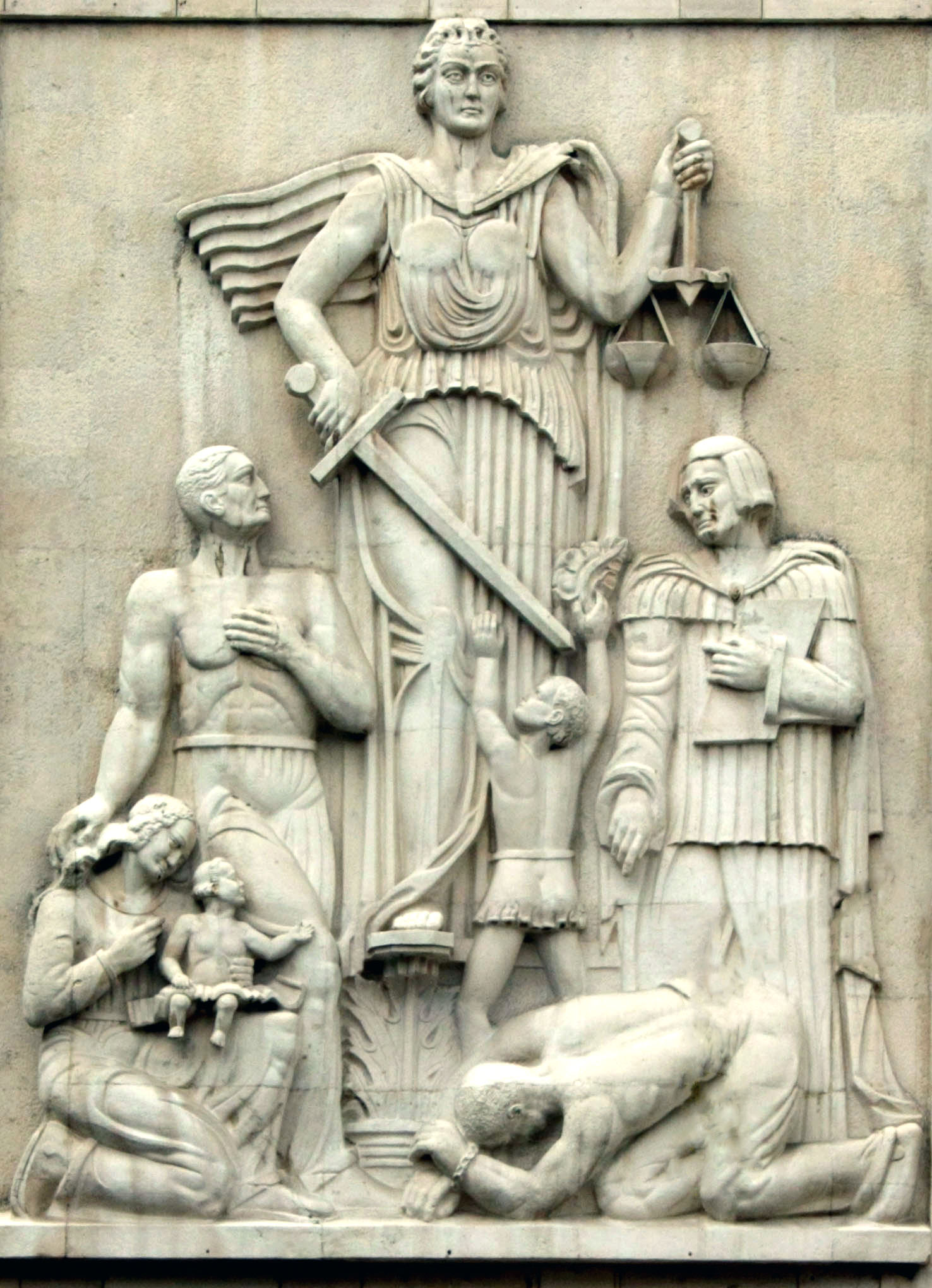
Justitia, Tehran courthouse, Tehran, Iran

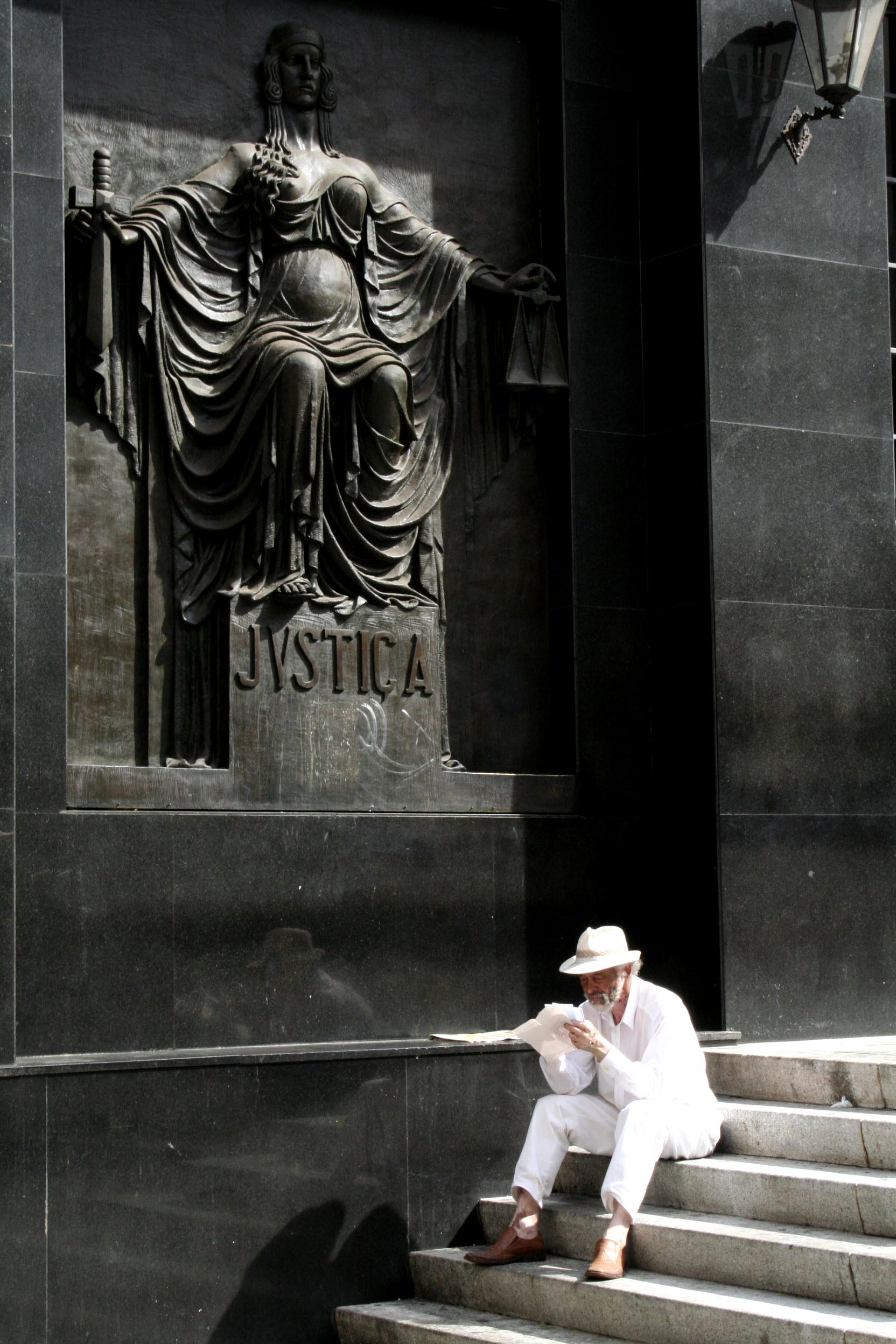
Justiça, high-relief in front of Justice Palace, Campinas, Brazil

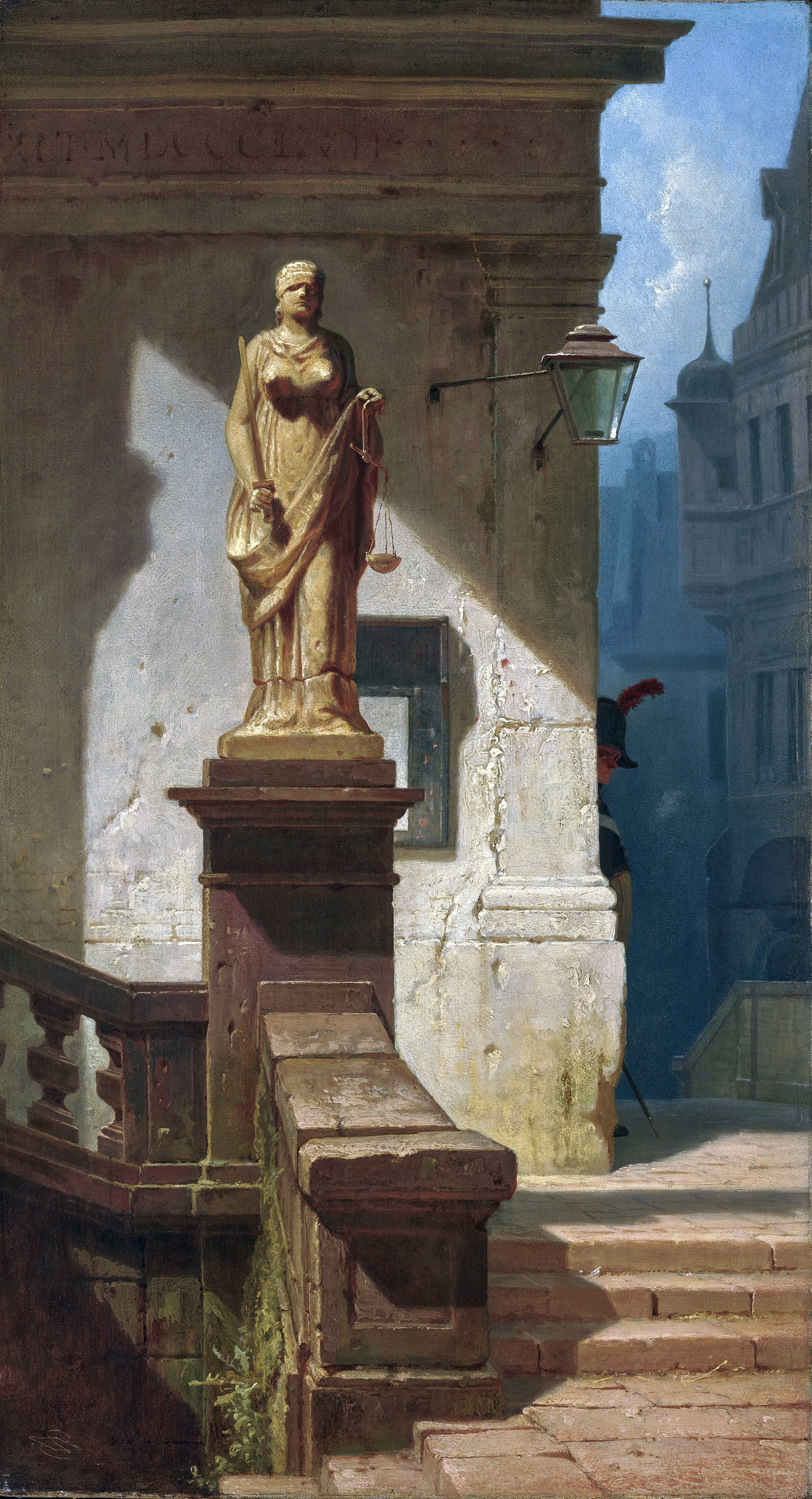
Justitia, Carl Spitzweg, 1857

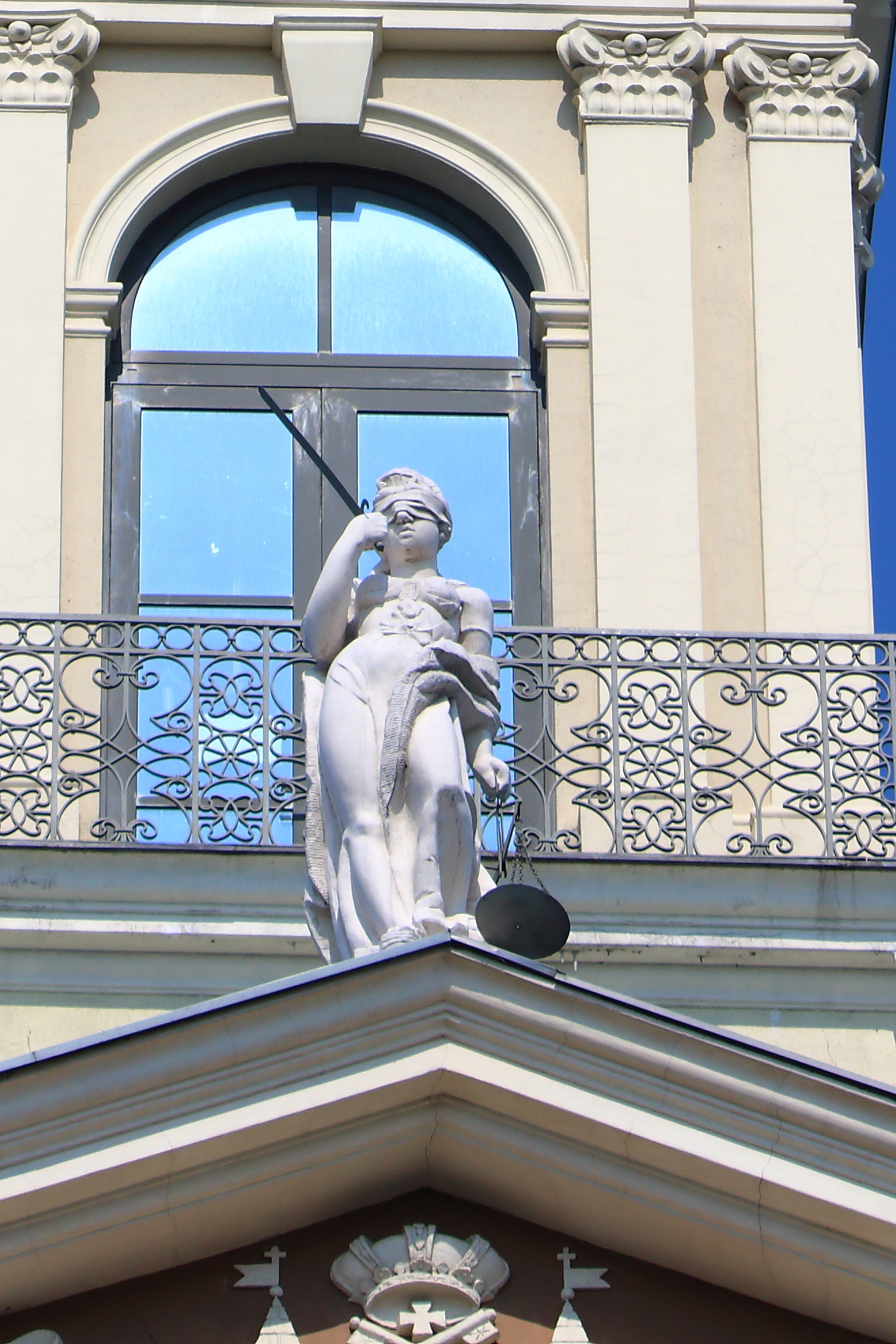
Lady Justice on the Riga Town Hall, Latvia

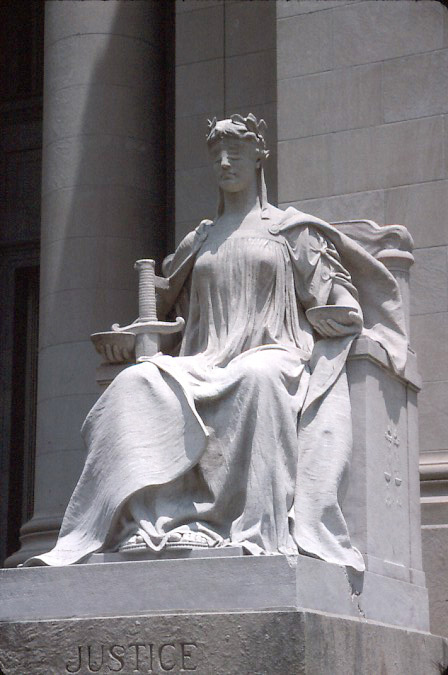
Lady Justice at the Shelby County Courthouse in Memphis, Tennessee

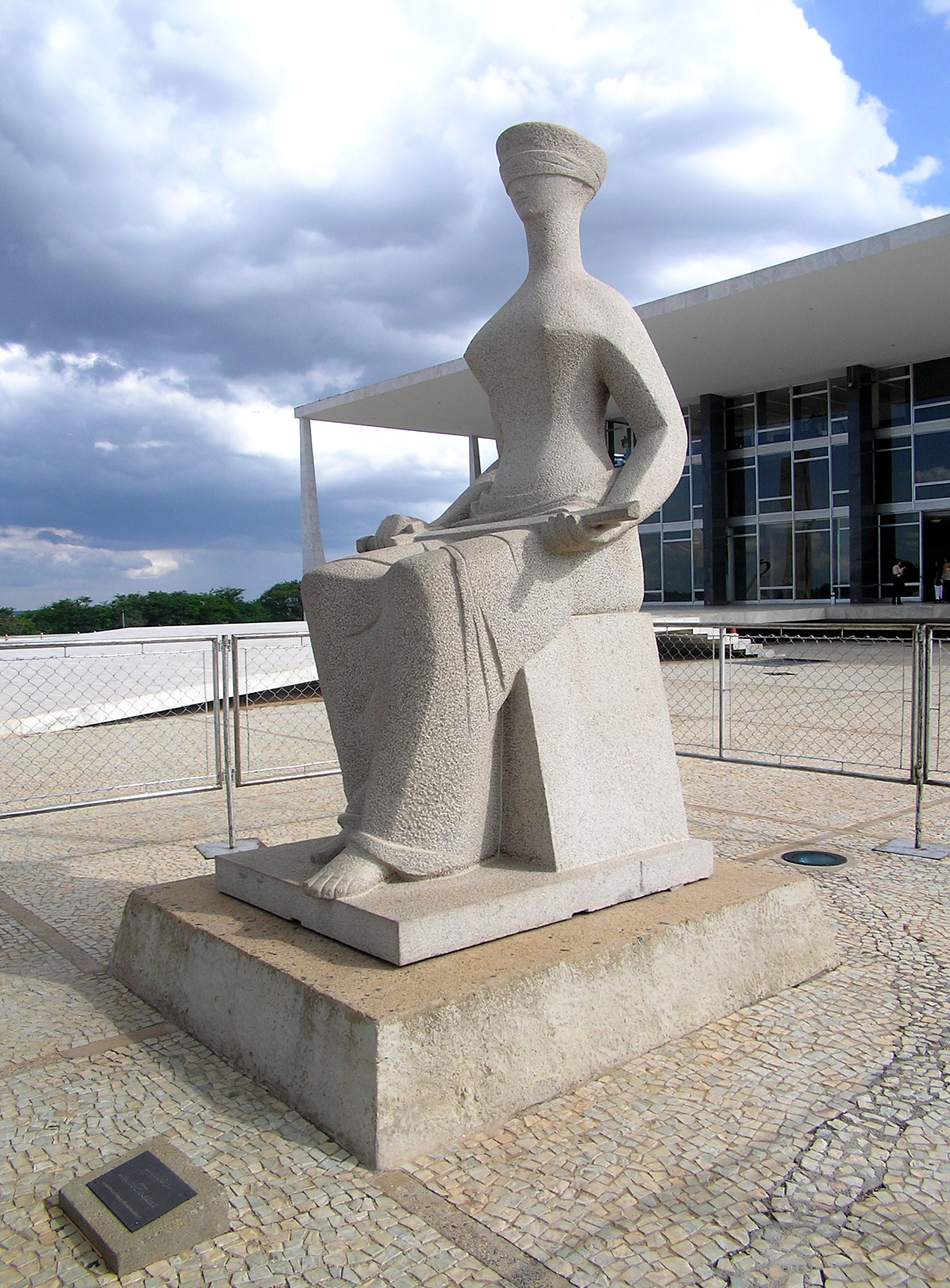
The Justice, in front of the Supreme Court of Brazil

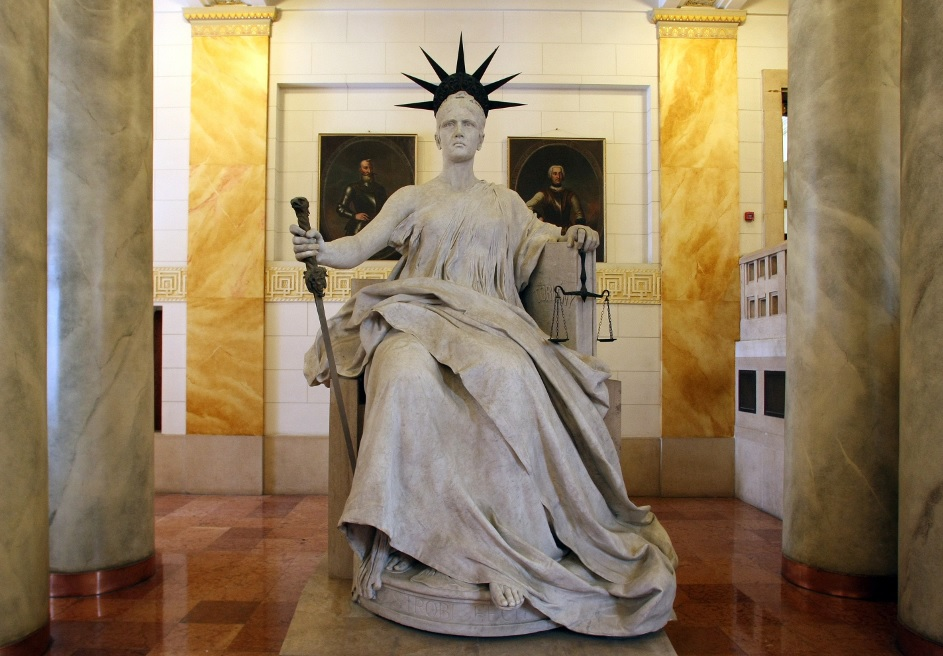
Justitia in the Superior Courts Building in Budapest, Hungary

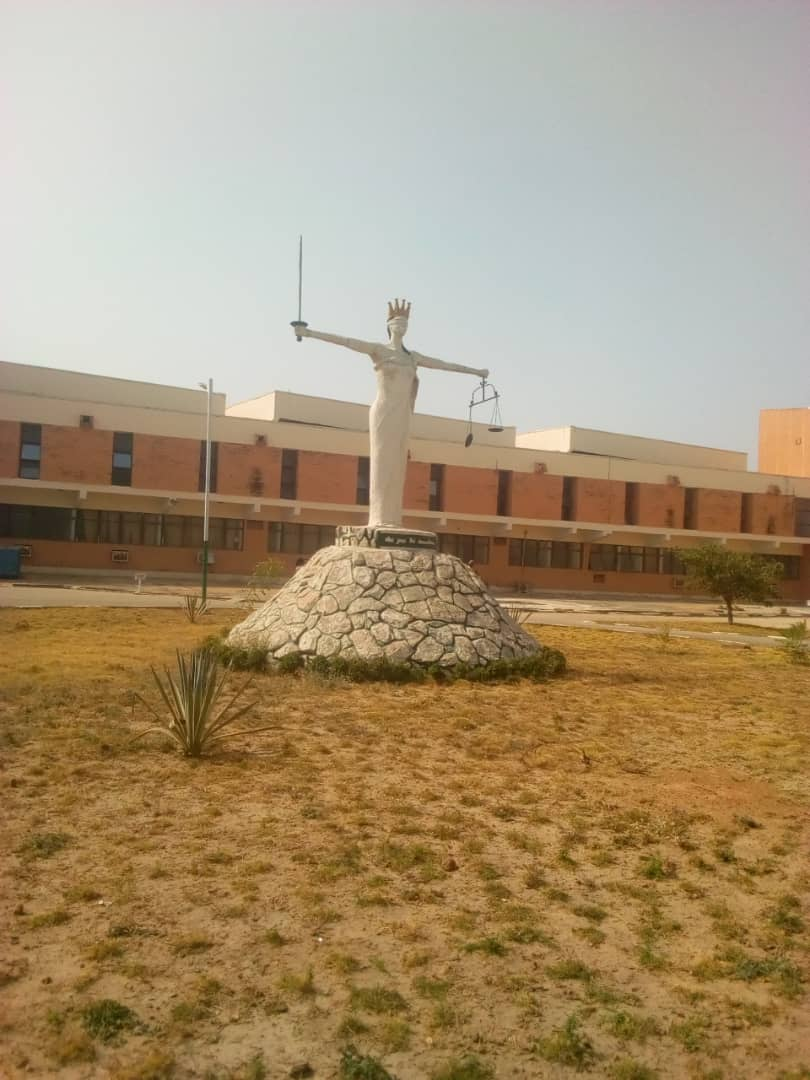
Lady Justice in Bauchi State High Court, Nigeria

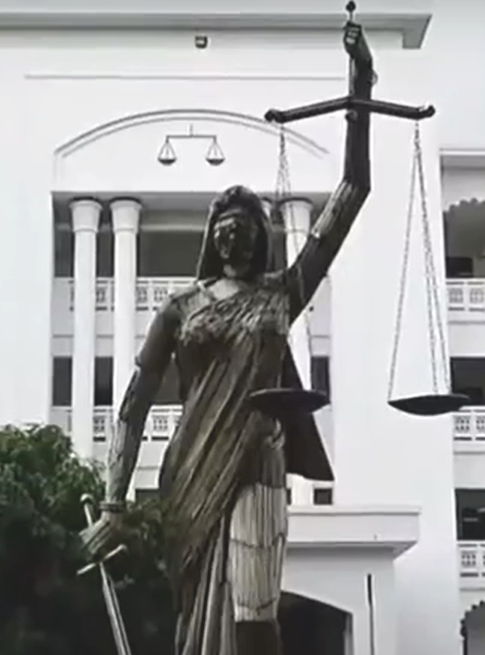
Statue of Lady Justice at the premises of the Supreme Court of Bangladesh

=== Painting ===
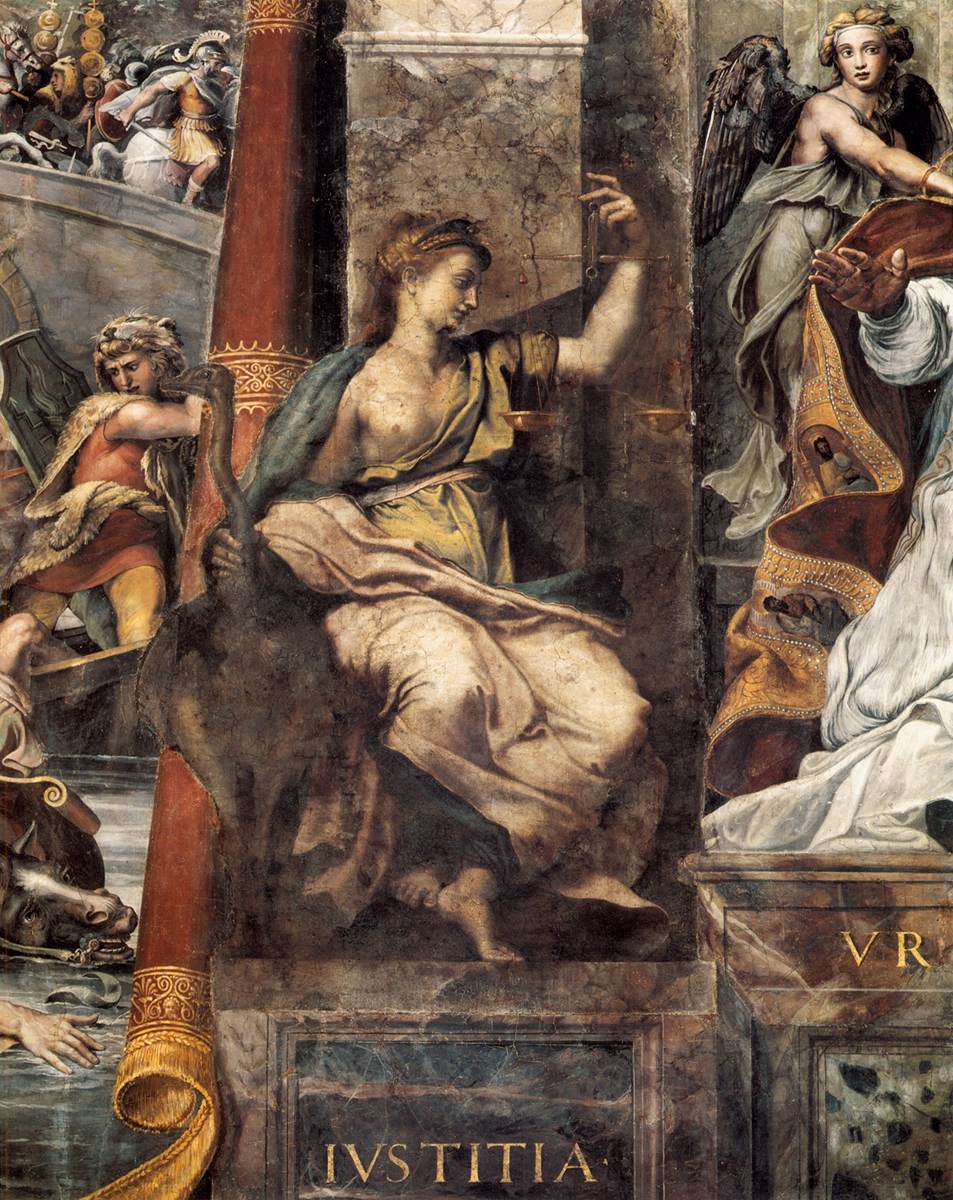
Fresco in the Sala di Costantino, Raphael Rooms, Raphael, c. 1520

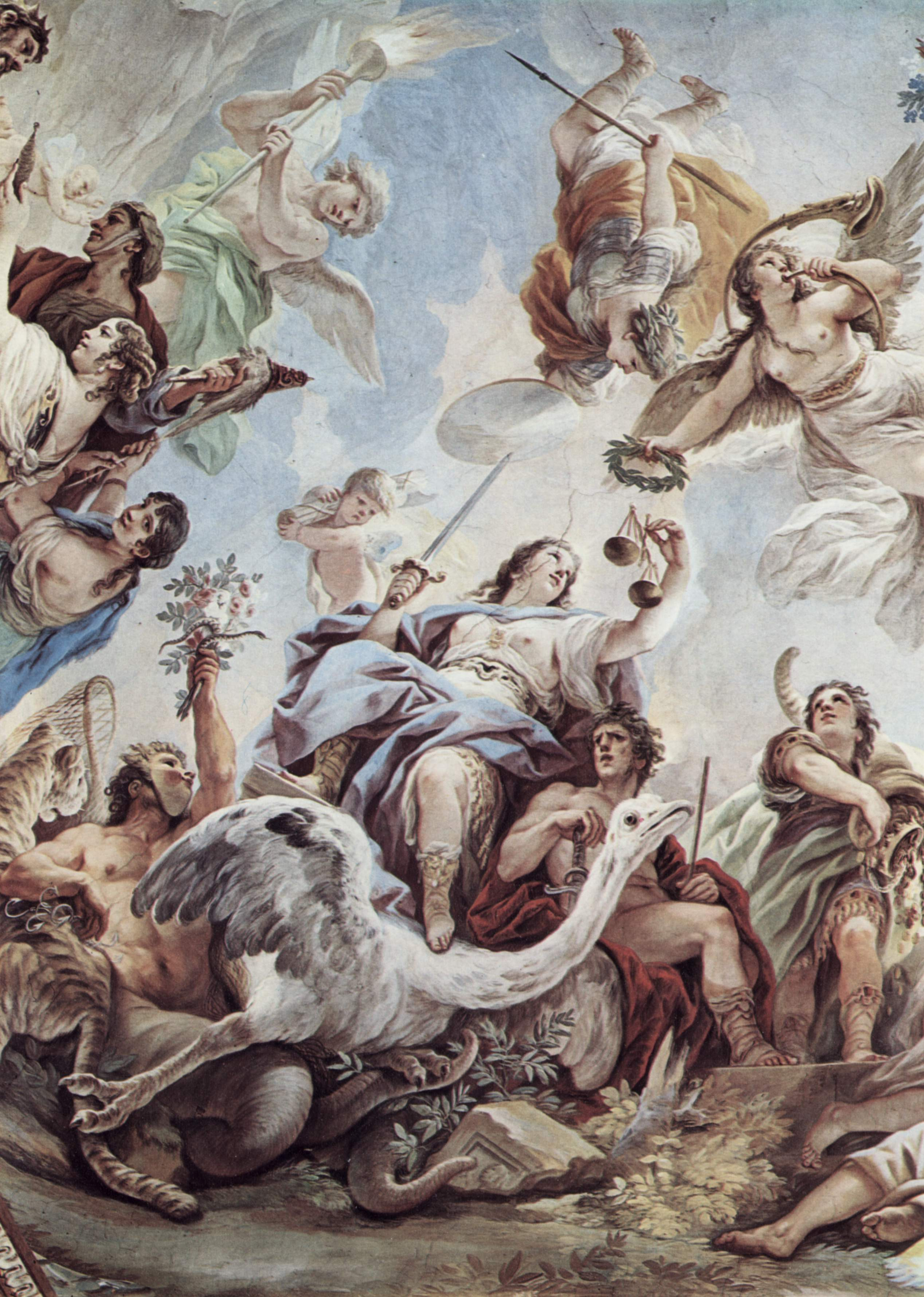
Luca Giordano, Palazzo Medici Riccardi in Florence, 1684–1686

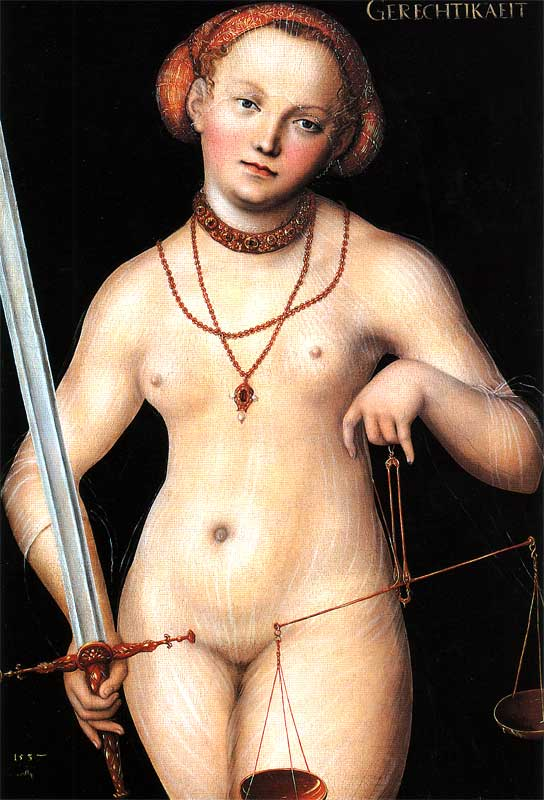
Gerechtigkeit, Lucas Cranach the Elder, 1537

== Heraldry ==
Lady Justice and her symbols are used in heraldry, especially in the arms and seals of legal government agencies.

Justitia in arms of Ilshofen in Baden-Württemberg

Scales and sword in the arms of a Swedish court of law

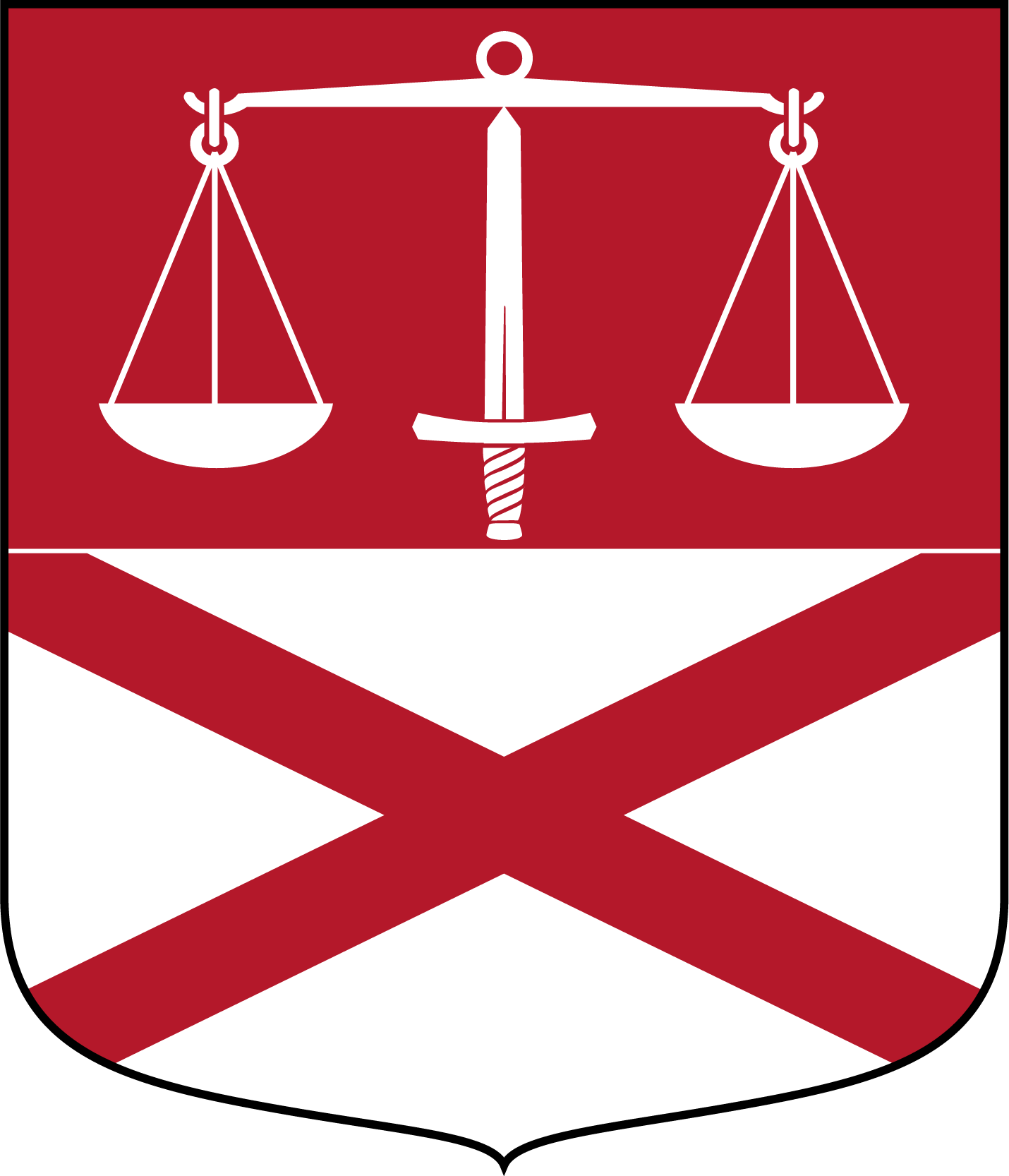
Scales balanced on a sword in the arms of Hörby

Prudentia and Justitia as supporters in the armorial achievement of Landskrona
Justice in numismatics

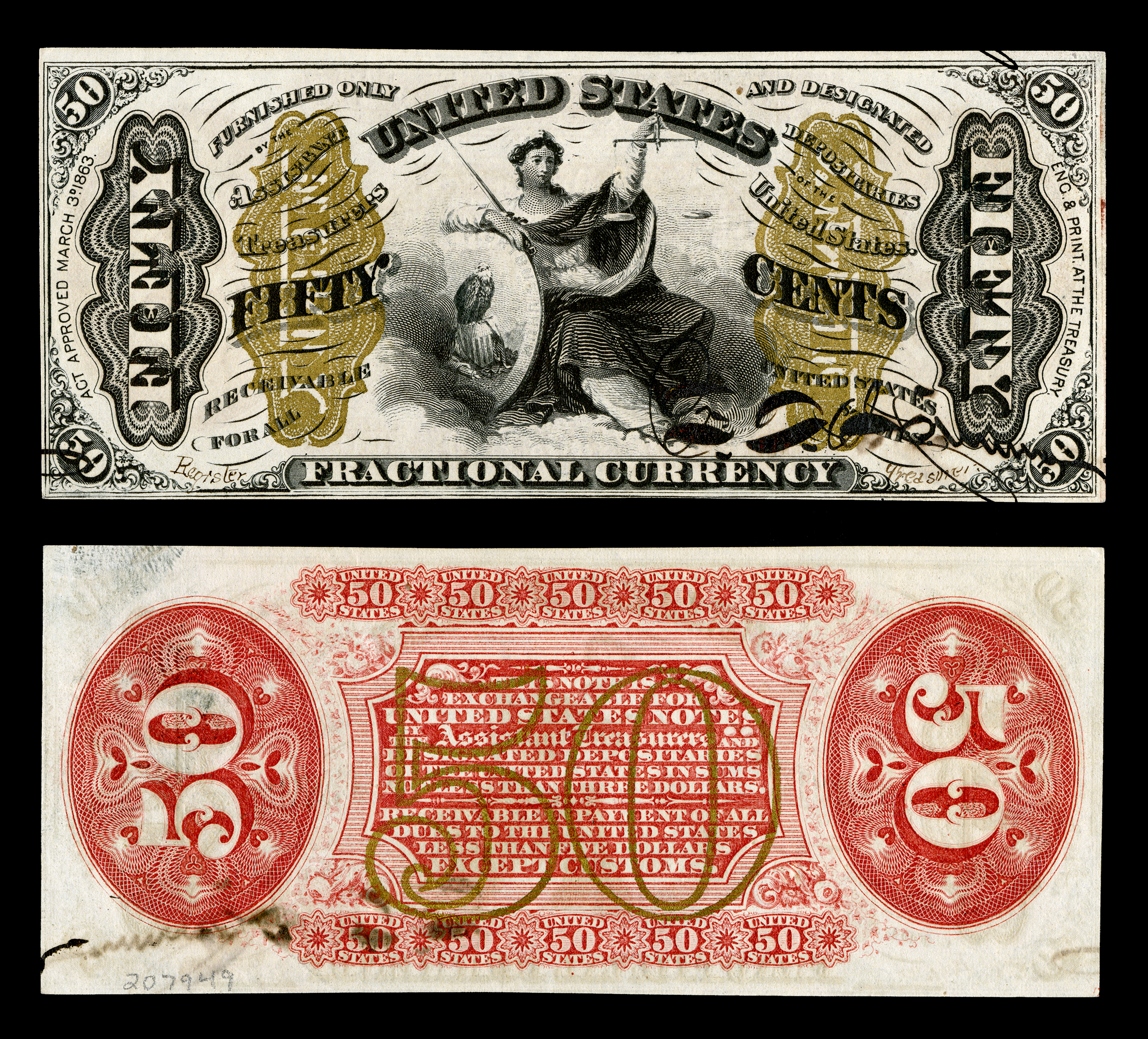
Justice holding scales, $0.50 U.S. fractional currency

== In computer systems ==
⚖o

Scales
- In Unicode: U+2696 ⚖ SCALES

Unicode version 4.1.0 implemented a scales symbol at code point U+2696, that may be used to represent the scales of justice.

== See also ==
=== Goddesses of Justice and related concepts ===
- (Goddesses of Justice): Astraea, Dike, Themis, Eunomia, Prudentia, Praxidice
- (Goddesses of Injustice): Adikia
- (Aspects of Justice):
  - (Justice) Themis/Dike/Eunomia/Justitia (Lady Justice), Raguel (the Angel of Justice)
  - (Retribution) Nemesis/Rhamnousia/Rhamnusia/Adrasteia/Adrestia/Invidia, Poena
  - (Redemption) Eleos/Soteria/Clementia, Zadkiel/Zachariel (the Angel of Mercy)
- Durga, Hindu goddess of justice
- Lady Luck
- Lady Liberty

=== Gods of Justice ===
- Yama
- Forseti (Norse God of Justice)
- Takhar (God of justice and vengeance in Serer religion)

=== Astronomy ===
- 5 Astraea, 24 Themis, 99 Dike and 269 Justitia, main belt asteroids all named for Astraea, Themis, Dike and Justitia, Classical goddesses of justice.

=== Notable programs ===
- "Operation Lady Justice" (Presidential Task Force on Missing and Murdered American Indians and Alaska Natives)

=== In fiction ===
- Judge Anderson, a female fictional law enforcer and psychic appearing in the British science fiction comics 2000 AD and the Judge Dredd Megazine.
- The Judge From Hell, a Korean legal drama featuring a female fictional judge possessed by demon judge Justitia

=== In popular culture ===
- Metallica, a popular American heavy metal band, used an illustrated depiction of a cracked, rope-bound Lady Justice for the cover of their studio album ...And Justice for All.
