= Invidia =

Latin personification of envy

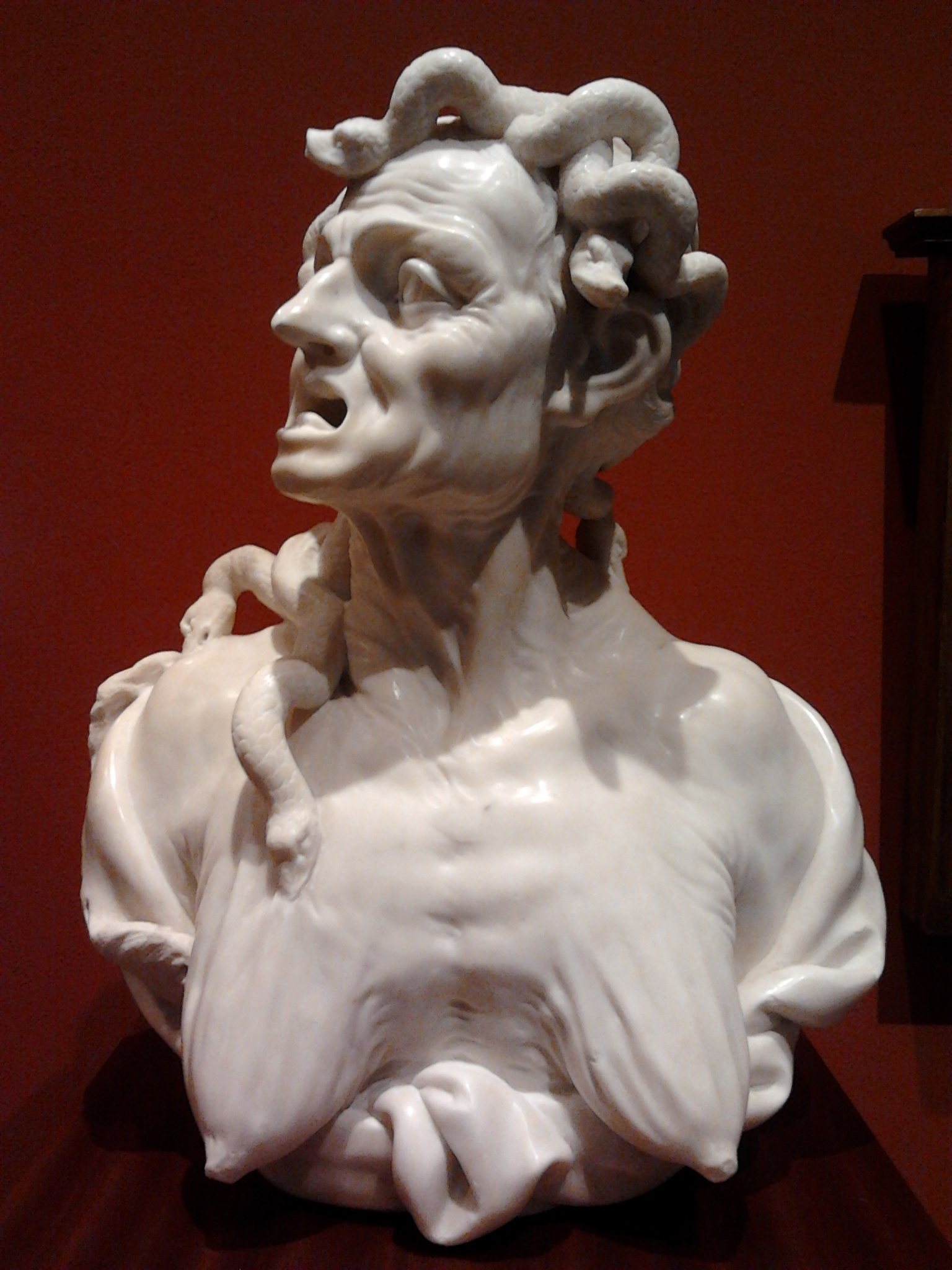
Envy (Invidia) (circa 1670) by Josse de Corte

In Latin, invidia is the sense of envy, a "looking upon" associated with the evil eye, from invidere, "to look against, to look in a hostile manner." Invidia ("Envy") is one of the Seven Deadly Sins in Christian belief.

== Invidia and magic ==
The material culture and literature of ancient Rome offer numerous examples of rituals and magic spells intended to avert invidia and the evil eye. When a Roman general celebrated a triumph, the Vestal Virgins suspended a fascinus, or phallic effigy, under the chariot to ward off invidia.

Envy is the vice most associated with witches and magic. The witch's protruding tongue alludes to Ovid's Invidia who has a poisoned tongue. The witch and Invidia share a significant feature – the Evil eye. The term invidia stems from the Latin invidere, "to look too closely". One type of the aggressive gaze is the "biting eye", often associated with envy, and reflects the ancient belief that envy originates from the eyes. Ovid feared that a witch who possessed eyes with double pupils would cast a burning fascination over his love affair.

Fascinare means to bewitch. Catullus in one of his love poems jokes nervously about ill wishers who might count the kisses he gives to his beloved and thus be able to "fascinate" the lovers with an evil, envious spell. A shepherd in one of Vergil's poems looks at his lambs, all skin and bones, and concludes, "some eye or other is bewitching them [fascinat]" – to which the commentator Servius adds "[the shepherd] obliquely indicates that he has a handsome flock, since it was worth afflicting with the evil eye [fascinari]". Any unusual felicity or success was felt to be subject to the unspecific but powerful force of envy [invidia]. That is why everyone from soldiers to infants to triumphing generals needed a fascinum, a remedy against the evil eye, an antidote, something that would make the evil wisher look away.

== Invidia as emotion ==
The experience of invidia, as Robert A. Kaster notes, is invariably an unpleasant one, whether feeling invidia or finding oneself its object. Invidia at the thought of another's good may be merely begrudging, Kaster observes, or begrudging and covetous at the same time: "I can feel dolor ["pain, sorrow, heartache"] at seeing your good, just because it is your good, period, or I can feel that way because the good is yours and not mine." Such invidia is morally indefensible: compare the Aesop fable "The Dog in the Manger". But by far the most common usage in Latin of invidia occurs in contexts where the sense of justice has been offended, and pain is experienced at the sight of undeserved wealth, prestige or authority, exercised without shame (pudor); this is the close parallel with Greek nemesis (νέμεσις).

== Latin literature ==
Invidia, defined as uneasy emotion denied by the shepherd Melipoeus in Virgil's Eclogue 1.

In Latin, invidia is the Greek personification of Nemesis and Phthonus. Invidia can be for literary purposes a goddess and Roman equivalent to Nemesis in Greek mythology as it received cultus, notably at her sanctuary around Rhamnous north of Marathon, Greece.

Ovid describes the personification of Invidia at length in the Metamorphoses (2.760-832):

Her face was sickly pale, her whole body lean and wasted, and she squinted horribly; her teeth were discoloured and decayed, her poisonous breast of a greenish hue, and her tongue dripped venom. … Gnawing at others, and being gnawed, she was herself her own torment.

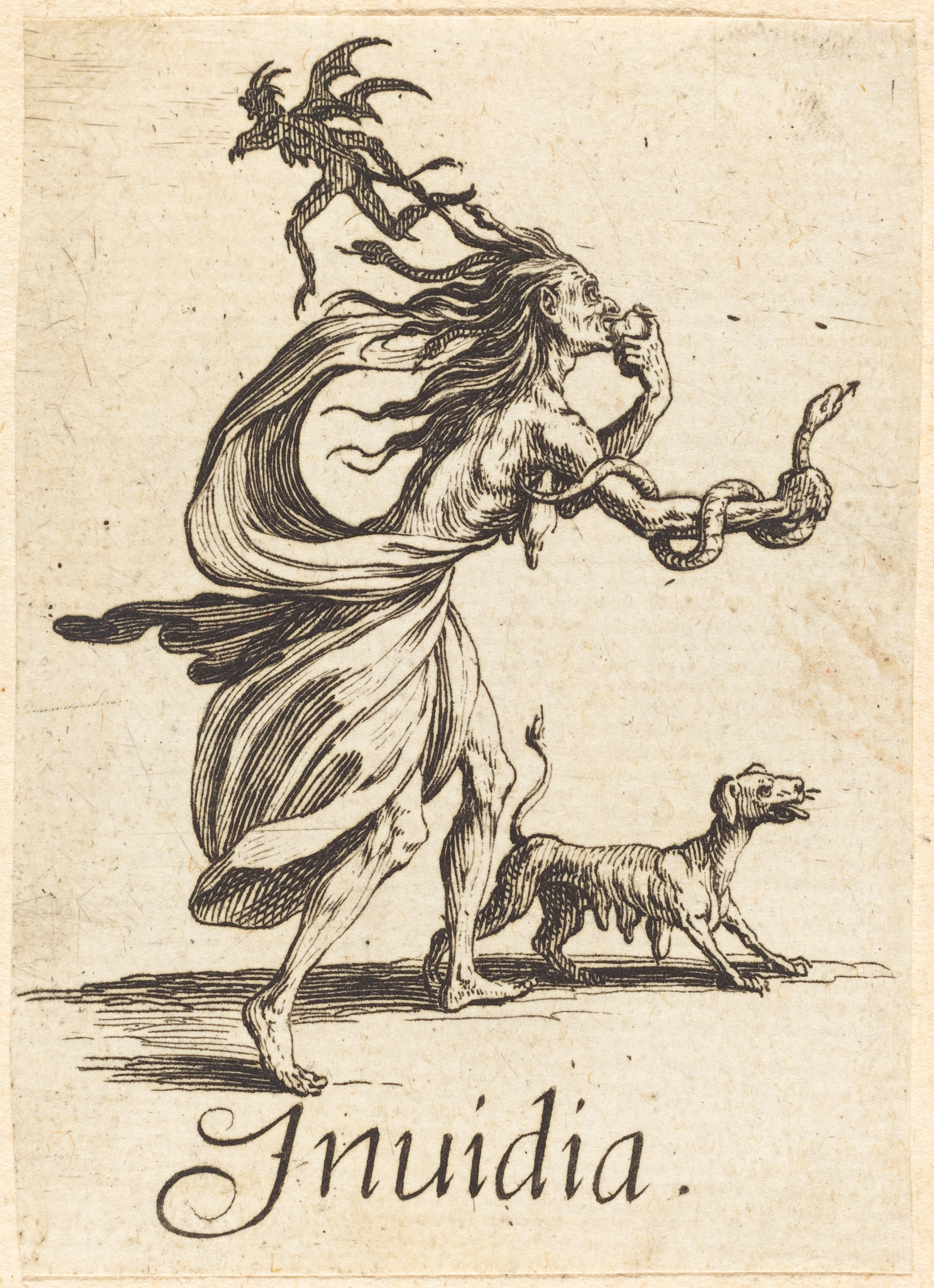
Invidia by Jacques Callot (1620) draws on a long iconic tradition.

== Allegorical invidia ==
Among Christians, Invidia is one of the Seven Deadly Sins.

In the allegorical mythography of the Middle Ages and Renaissance, the three heads of Cerberus sometimes represent three kinds of invidia.

In Late Gothic and Renaissance iconography, Invidia is personified invariably as a woman. Cesare Ripa's influential Iconologia (Rome, 1603) represented Invidia with a serpent coiled round her breast and biting her heart, "to signify her self-devouring bitterness; she also raises one hand to her mouth to show she cares only for herself". The representational tradition drew on Latin authors such as Ovid, Horace, and Pliny, as well as Andrea Alciato's emblem book and Jacopo Sannazaro. Alciato portrayed her devouring her own heart in her anguish.

Invidia is the fatal flaw of Iago in Shakespeare's Othello: "O you are well tuned now; but I'll set down the pegs that make this music." (Othello II.i).

== Modern usage of the term ==
The name of the Nvidia Corporation comes from Invidia in Roman mythology.

Invidia is also the name of a battle theme in Final Fantasy XV.

== See also ==
- (Goddesses of Justice): Astraea, Dike, Themis, Prudentia
- (Goddesses of Injustice): Adikia
- (Aspects of Justice): (see also: Triple deity/Triple Goddess (neopaganism))
  - (Justice) Themis/Dike/Justitia (Lady Justice), Raguel (the Angel of Justice)
  - (Retribution) Nemesis/Rhamnousia/Rhamnusia/Adrasteia/Invidia
  - (Redemption) Eleos/Soteria/Clementia, Zadkiel/Zerachiel (the Angel of Mercy)
