= Clementia =

Roman goddess of clemency

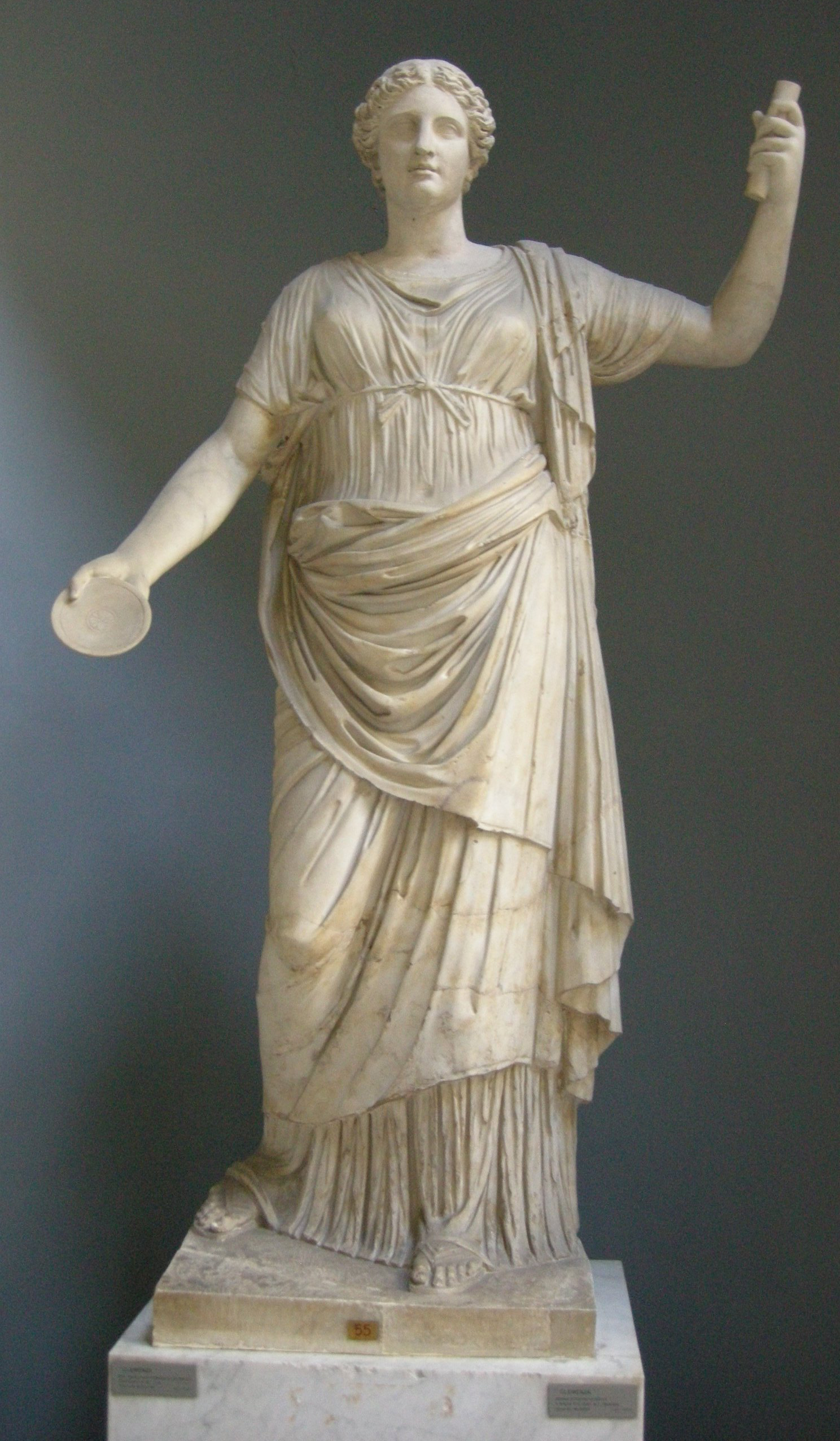
Ancient statue of Clementia in the Museo Chiaramonti

In Roman mythology and ancient religion, Clementia is the goddess of clemency, leniency, mercy, forgiveness, penance, redemption, absolution, acquittal, and salvation.

== Description ==
She was defined as a celebrated virtue of Julius Caesar, who was famed for his forbearance, especially following Caesar's civil war with Pompey from 49 BC. In 44 BC, a temple was consecrated to her by the Roman Senate, possibly at Caesar's instigation as Caesar was keen to demonstrate that he had this virtue.

In a letter to his friend Atticus, Cicero is discussing Caesar's clementia: "You will say they are frightened. I dare say they are, but I'll be bound they're more frightened of Pompey than of Caesar. They are delighted with his artful clemency and fear the other's wrath." Again in Pro rege Deiotaro (For King Deiotarus) Cicero discusses Caesar's virtue of clementia.

== Cult ==
There is not much information surrounding Clementia's cult; it would seem that she was merely an abstraction of a particular virtue, one that was revered in conjunction with revering Caesar and the Roman state. Clementia was seen as a good trait within a leader, it also the Latin word for "humanity" or "forbearance". This is opposed to Saevitia which was savagery and bloodshed. Yet, she was the Roman counterpart of Eleos, (not to be confused with Soteria), the Greek goddess of mercy and forgiveness who had a shrine in Athens.

In traditional imagery, she is depicted holding a branch (possibly an olive tree branch) and a scepter and may be leaning on a column.

== See also ==
- (Goddesses of Mercy and Compassion): Guanyin
- (Goddesses of Justice): Astraea, Dike, Themis, Prudentia
- (Goddesses of Injustice): Adikia
- (Aspects of Justice): (see also: Triple deity/Triple Goddess (neopaganism))
  - (Justice) Themis/Dike/Justitia (Lady Justice), Raguel (the Angel of Justice)
  - (Retribution) Nemesis/Rhamnousia/Rhamnusia/Adrasteia/Adrestia/Invidia
  - (Redemption) Eleos/Soteria/Clementia, Zadkiel/Zachariel (the Angel of Mercy)
