= Angel of Justice =

Angel of Justice may refer to:

- Raguel (angel), Angel of Justice, mainly of the Judaic traditions
- Lady Justice, an allegorical personification of the moral force in judicial systems

== See also ==
- Angel
- List of angels in theology
- Archangel
- Justice
- Astraea, goddess of Justice
- Dike (mythology), goddess of Justice
- Themis, goddess whose symbols are the Scales of Justice
- Prudentia, goddess of Justice
- Adikia, goddess of injustice
- Triple deity
- Triple Goddess (neopaganism)
