= Lady Luck =

Lady Luck, a personification of luck, may refer to:

== Fiction and mythology ==
- Fortuna, in Roman mythology, goddess of fortune
- Tyche, in Greek mythology, goddess of fortune
- Lady Luck (comics), a character created by Will Eisner

== Film ==
- Lady Luck (1936 film), a film directed by Charles Lamont
- Lady Luck (1942 film) or Lucky Ghost, a film directed by William Beaudine
- Lady Luck (1946 film), a film directed by Edwin L. Marin
- Lady Luck, a 1973 television film starring Bert Convy

== Music ==
- Lady Luck (rapper) (born 1983), American rapper
- Lady Luck (album), by Broadzilla, 2001

=== Songs ===
- "Lady Luck" (Jamie Woon song), 2011
- "Lady Luck"/"Dilly Dally", a single by After School, 2012
- "Lady Luck", by the 69 Eyes from Savage Garden
- "Lady Luck", by David Lee Roth from A Little Ain't Enough
- "Lady Luck", by Deep Purple from Come Taste the Band
- "Lady Luck", by Drag from The Way Out
- "Lady Luck", by Exo from Exodus
- "Lady Luck", by J.J. Cale from Travel-Log
- "Lady Luck", by Journey from Evolution
- "Lady Luck", by Kenny Loggins from Celebrate Me Home
- "Lady Luck", by Lloyd Price
- "Lady Luck", by the Proclaimers from The Best of The Proclaimers
- "Lady Luck", by Rod Stewart from A Spanner in the Works
- "Lady Luck", by Tesla from The Great Radio Controversy
- "Lady Luck", composed by Ray Perkins, from the 1929 film The Show of Shows

== Places and businesses ==
- Lady Luck Casino Caruthersville, Missouri, US
- Lady Luck Casino Vicksburg, now Casino Vicksburg, Mississippi, US
- Lady Luck Gaming, a defunct company in Las Vegas, Nevada, US
- Lady Luck Hotel & Casino, now Downtown Grand, Las Vegas, Nevada, US
- Lady Luck Casino Marquette, now Casino Queen Marquette, Iowa, US
- Lady Luck Casino Nemacolin, at Nemacolin Woodlands Resort, Farmington, Pennsylvania, US

== Other uses ==
- "Lady Luck", a special prize awarded at the Kinoschock film festival in Russia

== See also ==
- "Luck Be a Lady", a song from the musical Guys and Dolls, also covered by Frank Sinatra and many others
