= Zerachiel =

Judeo-Christian archangel

Zerachiel or Zachariel (Hebrew: זְכַרְאֵל Zəḵarʾēl, Tiberian: Zăḵarʾēl, God has remembered) also known as "Zakhariel" or "Saraqael", is one of the Archangels who leads souls to judgement. In Enoch I (the Book of Enoch) (Chapter 20) he is listed as one of the seven holy angels who watch; the angel who is set over the spirits who sin in the spirit. In the list of Pope Gregory I, one of the seven archangels is called Zachariel.

== See also ==
- List of angels in theology
- (Injustice): Lucifer/Satan
- (Aspects of Justice)
  - (Justice) Raguel
  - (Retribution) Angel of Death
  - (Redemption) Zadkiel
