= Eleos =

Greek deity of mercy and compassion

In ancient Athens, Eleos (Ancient Greek Ἔλεος m.) was the personification of compassion. Pausanias described her as "among all the gods the most useful to human life in all its vicissitudes."

== Mythology ==
Pausanias states that there was an altar in Athens dedicated to Eleos, at which children of Heracles sought refuge from Eurystheus' prosecution. Adrastus also came to this altar after the defeat of the Seven against Thebes, praying that those who died in the battle be buried. Eleos was only recognized in Athens, where she was honored by the cutting of hair and the removal of garments at the altar.

Statius in Thebaid (1st century) describes the altar to Clementia in Athens (treating Eleos as feminine based on the grammatical gender in Latin): "There was in the midst of the city [of Athens] an altar belonging to no god of power; gentle Clementia (Clemency) [Eleos] had there her seat, and the wretched made it sacred".
