= Soteria (mythology) =

Greek divinity, personification of salvation

- Goddess of Safety and Salvation
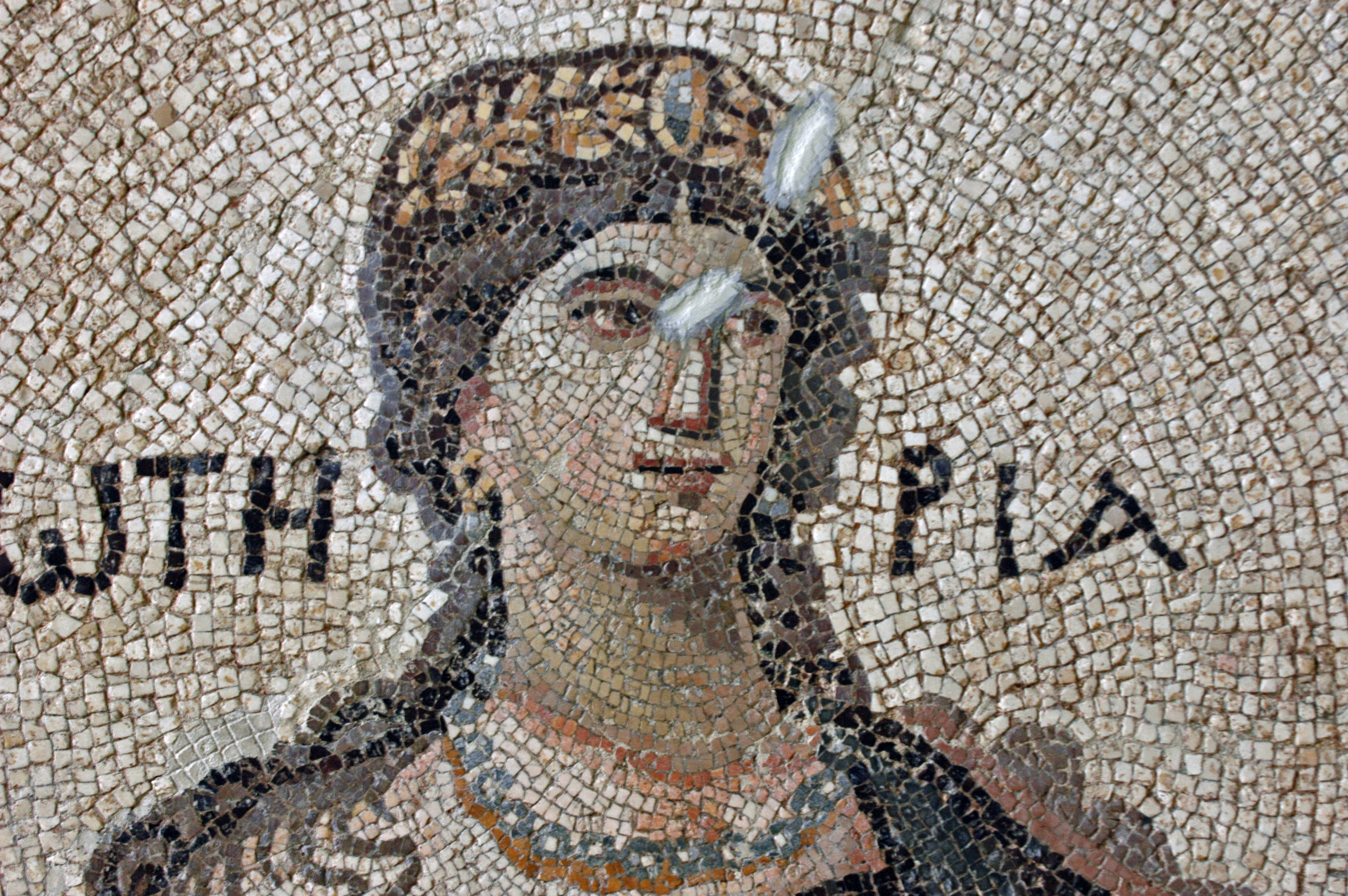
- A Greco-Roman mosaic depicting Soteria found in the frigidarium of the Apolausis Baths near Antakya in modern-day Turkey (c. 400 CE)
- Symbol: Laurel wreath
- Gender: Female
- Temple: Temple at Patrae

Equivalents
- Roman: Salus

In Greek mythology, Soteria (Greek: Σωτηρία) was a minor goddess or daimon who personified the concepts of safety, salvation, and preservation from harm. Soteria was also used as an epithet to represent functions of multiple goddesses, including Artemis, Persephone, and Hecate.

== Etymology ==
Soteria (σωτηρία) is the feminine form of soter (σωτήρ), meaning 'savior' or 'deliverer.' Soteria was used to describe similar concepts, and could mean 'security,' 'deliverance,' and 'well-being.' Soter was frequently used as an epithet of masculine protector gods, including Poseidon and Zeus.

== Functions and worship ==
The concept of soteria first appeared in the 5th century BCE, and was primarily used to describe success in war. It was specifically used in the context of the Greco-Persian Wars, in which the Greeks were delivered from harm and ultimately victorious over the Achaemenid Empire. Its definitions and applicability broadened over time, and could be used to refer to any form of well-being, including good health, military victory, marital prosperity, safe voyage or passage, or liberation from tyranny. The goddess Soteria personified the concept of soteria, and embodied its multitude of meanings and potential applications.

Soteria had a sanctuary built in her honor in the city of Patrae, believed to have been founded by the Thessalian king Eurypylus. He founded the temple after being cured from his madness, which he was struck with after opening a chest containing a sacred idol of Dionysus. There was a sacred statue of the goddess within the temple, which could only be seen by the priests. The priests would also take cakes from Soteria's temple and throw them into the sea in honor of Arethusa, a nymph and follower of Artemis who fled to Syracuse to escape her attacker Alpheus.

Soteria were also a type of festival held to celebrate the protector aspects of a deity— Zeus Soter, for example— often following a threat or danger to the city or region. The festivals could also be held in honor of mortal heroes, such as the annual Arateium in Sicyon, which celebrated Aratus. A Soteria could also be held for one person to celebrate their recovery from illness or escape from danger.
