= Raguel (angel) =

Angel of justice in some Christian traditions

Archangel
- Venerated in: Ethiopian Orthodox Tewahedo Church, Melkite Catholic Church

Raguel (Greek: Ῥαγουὴλ Rhagouḕl; Hebrew: רְעוּאֵל Rəʿūʾēl, Tiberian: Rŭʿūʾēl) also known as Akrasiel, Raguil, Raquel, Rakul and Reuel, is an angel mainly of various Christian traditions. He is considered an archangel of justice. His name means "God shall pasture". This meaning is also related to the Hebrew word "rōʿī" (רֹעִי), meaning shepherd.

Raguel is almost always referred to as the archangel of justice, fairness, harmony, vengeance, and redemption. In the Book of Enoch, chap. XXIII, Raguel is one of the seven angels whose role is to watch. His number is 6, and his function is to take vengeance on the world of the luminaries who have transgressed God's laws.

Raguel's duties have remained the same across Christian traditions. Much like a sheriff or constable, Raguel's purpose has always been to keep fallen angels and demons in check, delivering judgment upon any that over-step their boundaries. He has been known to destroy wicked spirits and cast fallen angels into Hell (called Gehenna in the Hebrew Old Testament and called Tartarus in the Greek New Testament).

Raguel is not mentioned in the canonical writings of the Bible. However, in 2 Enoch, which is generally considered non-canonical, the patriarch Enoch was carried as a mortal to and from Heaven by the angels Raguel and Sariel.

== See also ==
- Angel of Justice
- List of angels in theology
- Sariel
