= Themis of Rhamnous =

Statue of the goddess of natural law

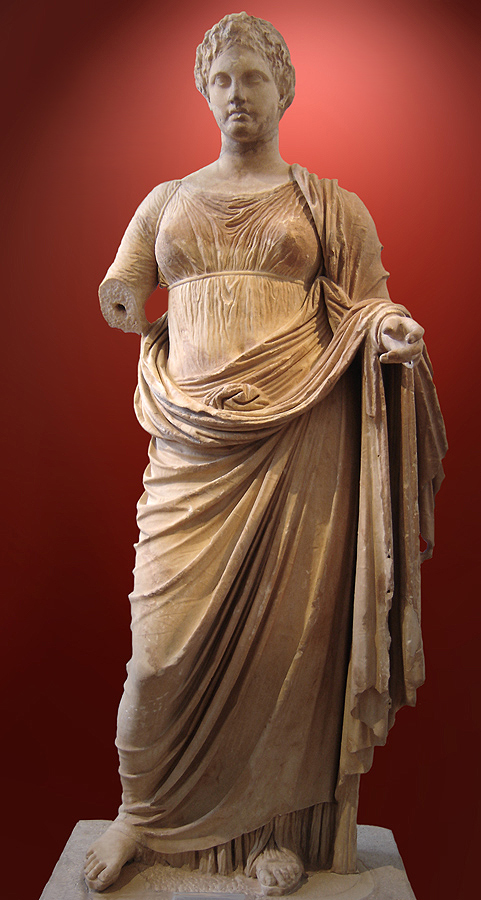
The Themis of Rhamnous as displayed in the National Archaeological Museum, Athens

The Themis of Rhamnous is a statue found in 1890 in Rhamnous, identified as the goddess Themis and dated to around 300 BCE on the basis of a dedicatory inscription on its base. It is displayed in the National Archaeological Museum of Athens with inventory number 231.

== Description ==
The statue, 2.22 metres (87 in) tall, is carved of Pentelic marble. Her standing figure is dressed in a sleeved chiton caught by a zone under the bodice, wrapped in a himation whose ends are draped over her outstretched left forearm. The head is carved separately, the hair upswept and carved sketchily. Her weight is borne on the left leg, with the right knee brought forward and the heel lifted. The right forearm is missing, and would have held an offering bowl; the left hand would have held a set of scales. One curiosity is the knot of fabric resting on the himation; this detail has no clear relationship to the rest of the drapery.

The figure stands on a low, square base with molding at both the top and the bottom. On its front surface is a dedicatory inscription by Megakles son of Megakles, identifying the sculptor as Chairestratos son of Charedemos.

== Discovery and interpretation ==
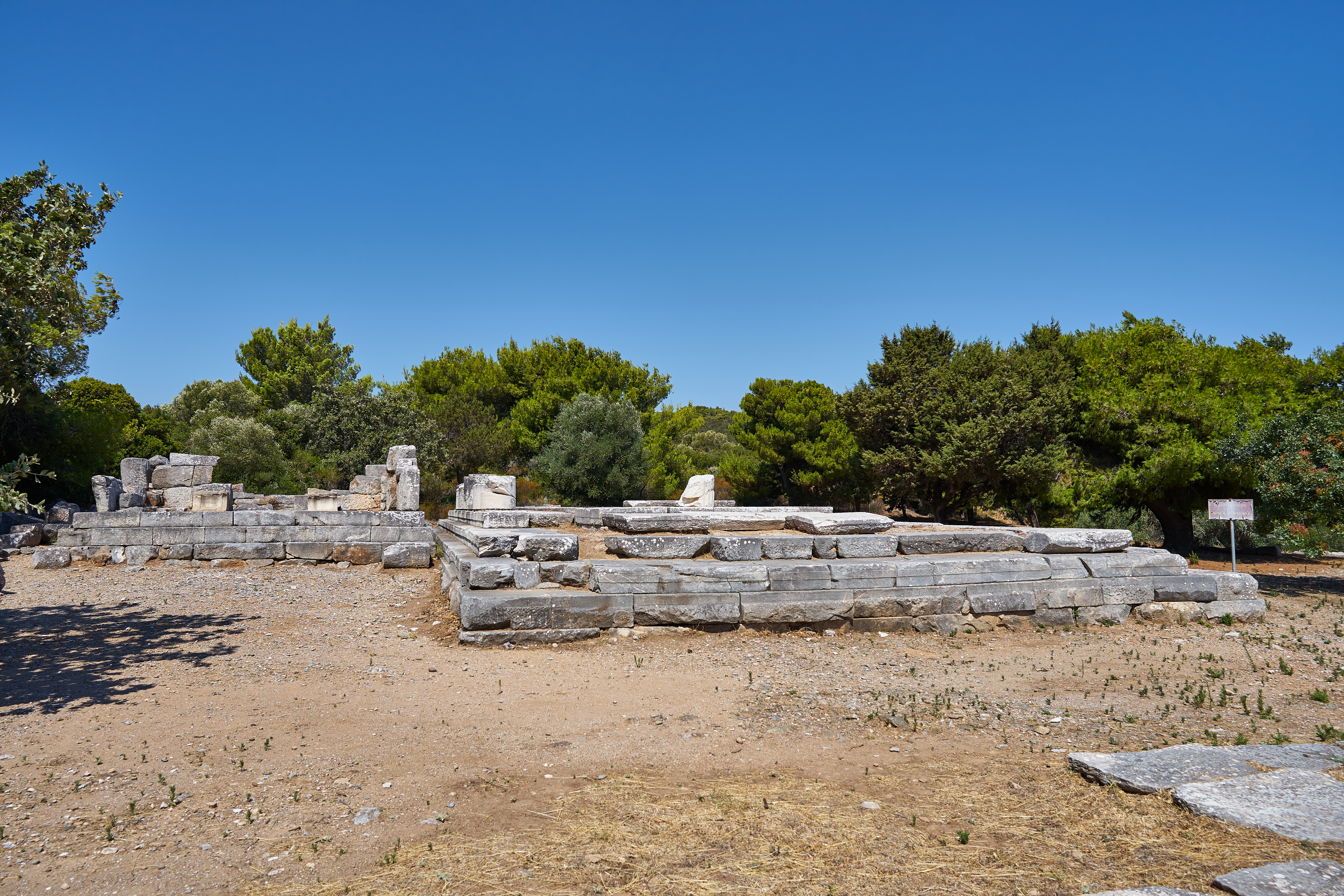
The smaller temple at Rhamnous (left), where the statue was found

The statue was discovered in 1890 in the course of excavations by the Archaeological Society of Athens, directed by Valerios Stais. It was found, along with other statuary and fragments, in the cella of the smaller of the two temples which lie adjacent to each other on the site. The larger temple is definitely associated with Nemesis, but there is uncertainty as to the smaller one; generally, it is assigned to Themis on the basis of this statue, as well as a pair of thrones found in the temple entrance, one of which bears an inscription dedicating it to the goddess.

The statue has consistently been dated to around 300 BCE on the basis of the dedication and on stylistic grounds. An inscription indicates that a Charedemos was a priest in Rhamnous in 315 or 314; another inscription from the Agora in Athens mentions a Chairestratos son of Charedemos active in 328/327, variously speculated to be the grandfather or possibly the sculptor of the Themis itself. A stylistic connection has been suggested to a torso (S 2370) found in Athens and tentatively identified as a personification of Demokratia, Tyche, or Themis.
