= Archenemy =

Main enemy of someone

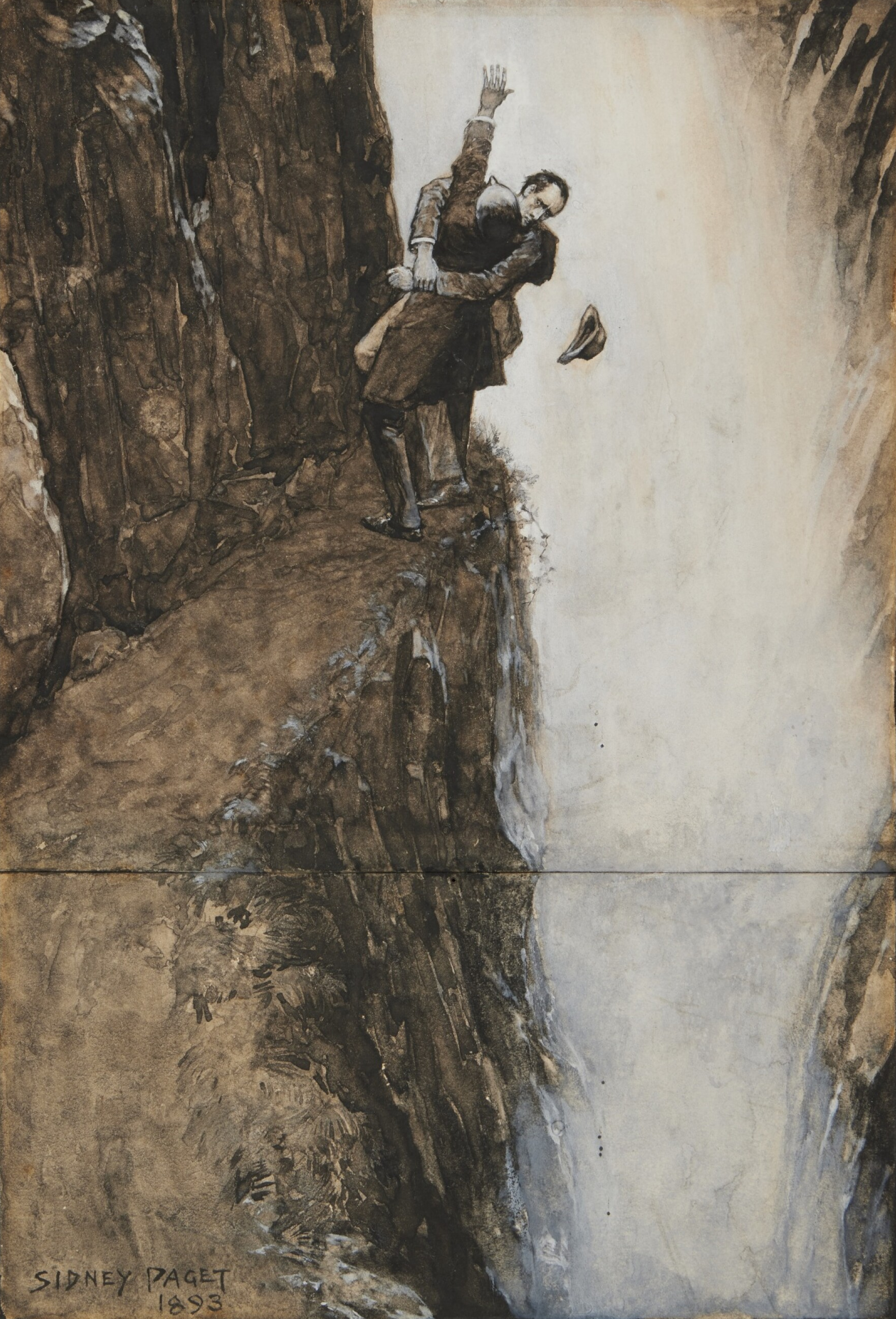
Sherlock Holmes wrestling against his archenemy Professor James Moriarty in Sidney Paget's illustration of The Death of Sherlock Holmes in "The Adventure of the Final Problem" (1893)

In literature, an archenemy (sometimes spelled as arch-enemy) or archnemesis is the main enemy of the protagonist—or sometimes, one of the other main characters—appearing as the most prominent and most-known enemy of the hero.

== Etymology ==
The word archenemy originated around the mid-16th century, from the words arch- (from Greek ἄρχω archo meaning 'to lead') and enemy.

An archenemy may also be referred to as an archrival, archfoe, archvillain, or archnemesis, but an archenemy may also be distinguished from an archnemesis, with the latter being an enemy whom the hero cannot defeat (or who defeats the hero), even while not being a longstanding or consistent enemy to the hero.

The archenemy should not be confused with the proper meaning of Nemesis — the Greek goddess of justice, retribution, and vengeance — who delivered divine punishment on those who committed great offences against the gods and the world.

== See also ==
- Antagonist
- Supervillain
- Villain
- Nemesis
