= Agoracritus =

5th-century BC Greek sculptor

Agoracritus (Ancient Greek: Ἀγοράκριτος Agorákritos; /ˌæɡəˈrækrɪtəs/; fl. late 5th century BC) was a famous sculptor in ancient Greece.

== Life ==
Agoracritus was born on the island of Paros, and was active from about Olympiad 85 to 88, that is, from about 436 to 424 BC. He was a pupil of the sculptor Phidias.

Only four of Agoracritus' works are mentioned: a statue of Zeus and one of Athena Itonia in the temple of that goddess at Athens; a statue, probably of Cybele, in the temple of the Great Goddess at Athens; and the Rhamnusian Nemesis. Respecting this last work there has been a great deal of discussion. The account which Pliny gives of it is that Agoracritus contended with Alcamenes (another distinguished disciple of Phidias) in making a statue of Venus; and that the Athenians, through an undue partiality towards their countryman, awarded the victory to Alcamenes. Agoracritus, indignant at his defeat, made some slight alterations so as to change his Venus into a Nemesis (the goddess of retribution or revenge), and sold it to the people of Rhamnus on the condition that it should never be set up in Athens.

Pausanias, without saying a word about Agoracritus, says that the Rhamnusian Nemesis was the work of Phidias, and was made out of the block of Parian marble, which the Persians under Datis and Artaphernes brought with them for the purpose of setting up a trophy. This account however has been overwhelmingly rejected as involving a confusion of the ideas connected by the Greeks with the goddess Nemesis. The statue moreover was not of Parian, but of Pentelic marble. Strabo, John Tzetzes, the Suda and Photius give other variations in speaking of this statue. It seems generally agreed that Pliny's account of the matter is correct in most of the particulars; and there have been various dissertations on the way in which a statue of Venus could have been changed into one of Nemesis.

As late as the early 20th century, parts of the statue's head were in the British Museum; some fragments of the reliefs which adorned the pedestal were in the museum at Athens. By the beginning of the 21st century, enough fragments had been recovered (including the base) that a partial reconstruction of Agoracritus' Nemesis was performed in Rhamnus. In it, Nemesis is depicted holding an apple branch and a phiale, wearing a crown decorated with deer. The base depicts Leda showing Helen to Tyndareus.

Agoracritus is also a character (the sausage seller) in Greek playwright Aristophanes' play The Knights.
