= Rhamnous =

Ancient Greek city

- Ῥαμνοῦς (Ancient Greek)
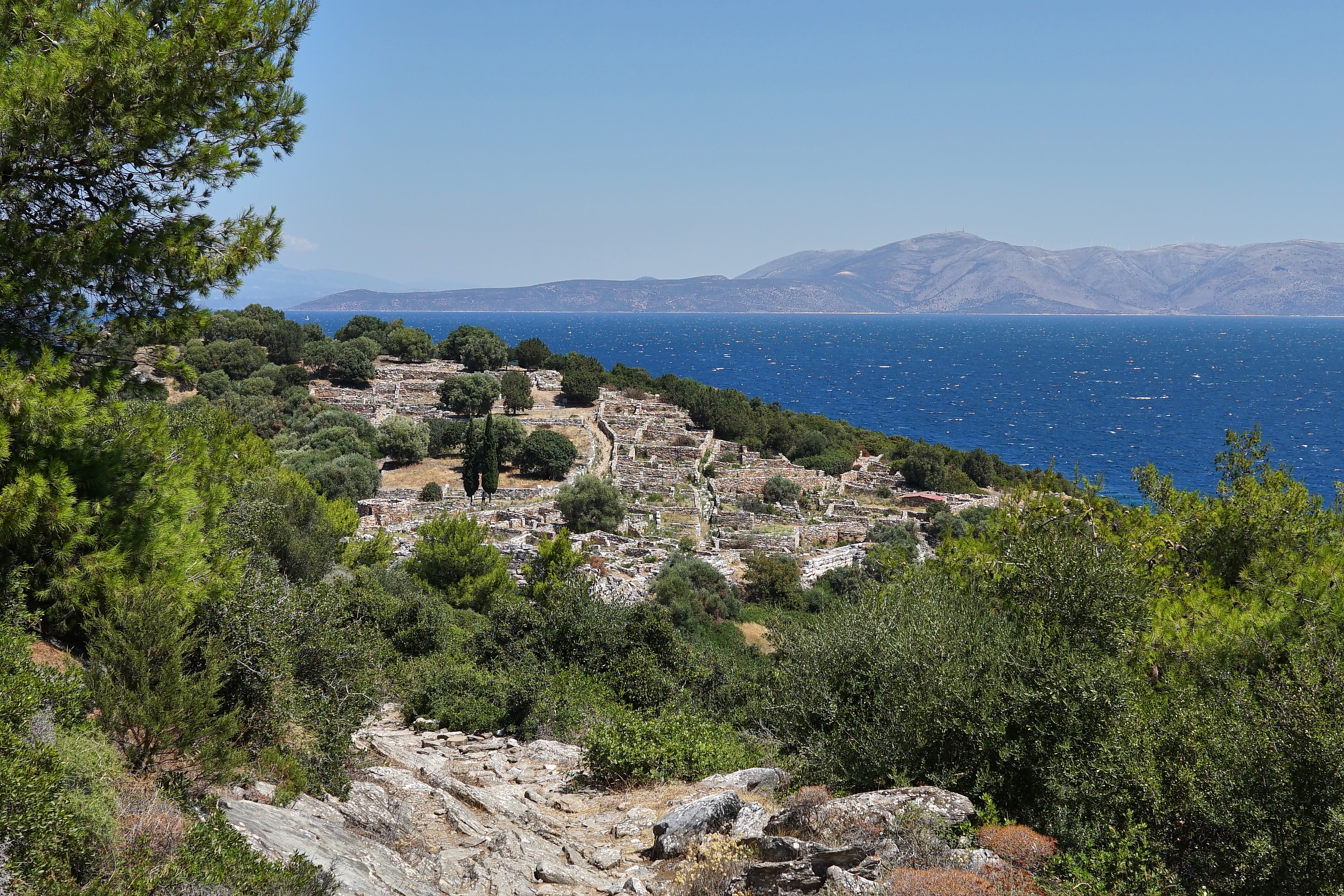
- View of the site of Rhamnous

- Location within Greece
- 38°13′24″N 24°1′38″E
- Periods: Hellenistic
- Satellite of: Athens
- Location: Agia Marina, Attica, Greece
- Region: Attica

Site notes
- Management: 2nd Ephorate of Prehistoric and Classical Antiquities
- Public access: Yes
- Website: Ramnous

Rhamnous (Ancient Greek: Ῥαμνοῦς, romanized: Rhamnoûs; Modern Greek: Ραμνούς, romanized: Ramnoús), also Ramnous or Rhamnus, was an ancient Greek city in Attica situated on the coast, overlooking the Euboean Strait. Its ruins lie northwest of the modern town of Agia Marina in the municipality of Marathon.

The site was best known in antiquity for its sanctuary of Nemesis, the implacable avenging goddess, her most important in ancient Greece.

Rhamnous is the best-preserved Attic deme site. It was strategically significant on the sea routes and was fortified with an Athenian garrison of ephebes (young men). A fortified acropolis dominates the two small harbours located on either side of it which have silted up extensively since antiquity, and into which grain was imported for Athens during the Peloponnesian War.

It derived its name from Buckthorn, a thick prickly shrub, which still grows upon the site.

== Location ==
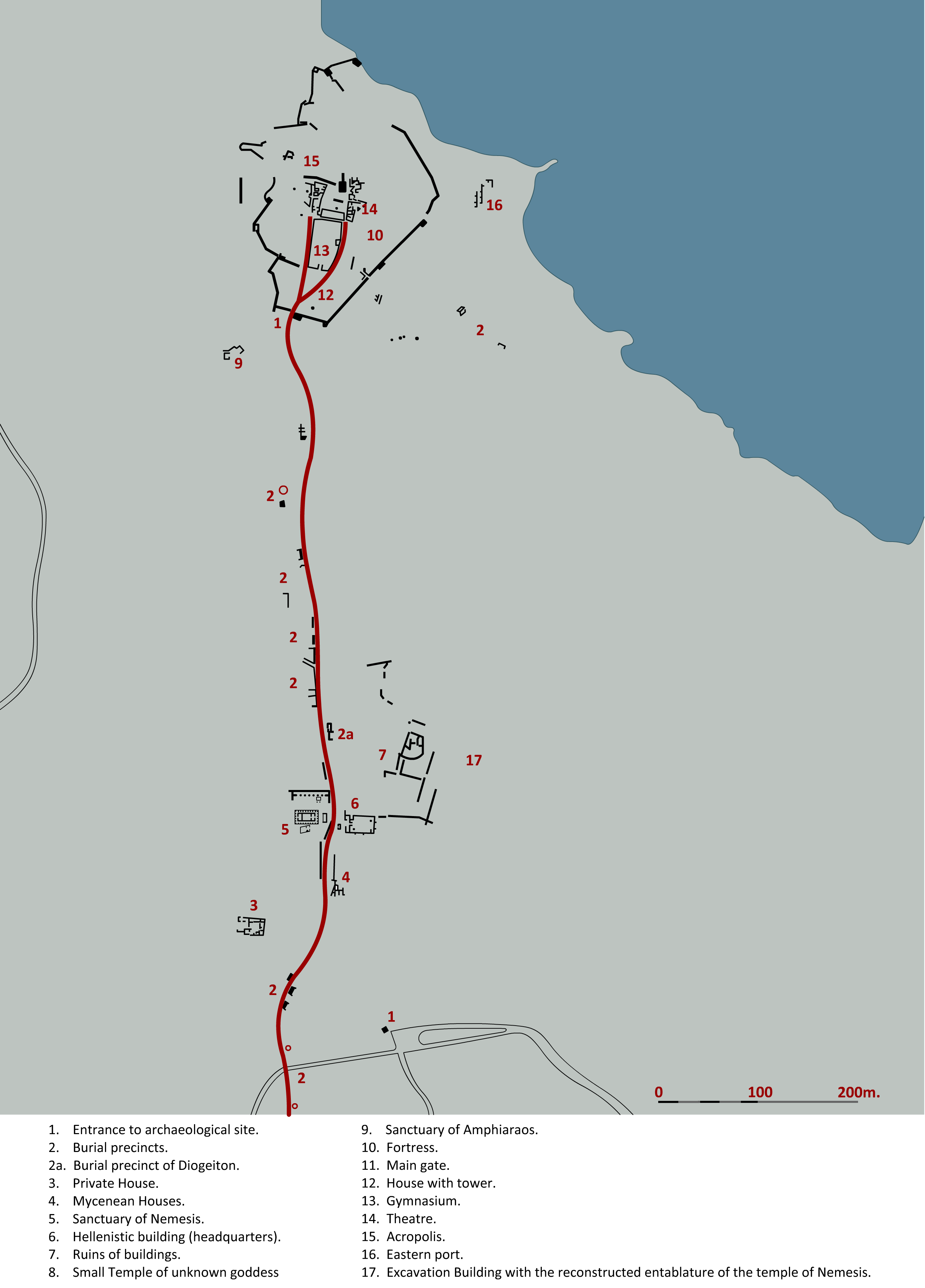
Map of Rhamnous

Rhamnus was situated on the east coast of Attica. The town occupied a small plain 3 miles (5 km) wide, atop a rocky peninsula surrounded by the sea for two-thirds of its circumference. A narrow ridge connected the peninsula with the mountains which closely approached it on the land side and shut it out from the rest of Attica. Nearby was the road between Marathon and Oropus.

== History ==
Rhamnus or Rhamnous (Ancient Greek: Ῥαμνοῦς) or Rhamnuntus or Rhamnountos (Ῥαμνοῦντος) was a deme of ancient Attica, belonging to the tribe Aeantis.

It is described in the Periplus of Pseudo-Scylax as a fortified place; and it appears from a decree in Demosthenes to have been regarded as one of the chief fortresses in Attica. An Athenian garrison was permanently stationed at Rhamnus, in the small enclosure at the top of the hill, to watch over navigation.

It was chiefly celebrated in antiquity on account of its nearby sanctuary for the worship of Nemesis, who was hence called by the Latin poets Rhamnsusia virgo and dea Rhamnusia.

Of the two temples in the sanctuary, the small temple is the earlier and dates from the late 6th century BC and was probably destroyed in the First Persian invasion of Greece of 480–479 BC. A new temple to both the goddesses Themis and Nemesis was built over the remains. Others argue that the temple was destroyed towards the close of the Peloponnesian War by the Persian allies of Sparta.

Construction of the larger temple to Nemesis began around 460–450 BC and continued until 430–420. It was probably erected in honour of the goddess who had taken vengeance on the barbarians for outraging her worship. The Peloponnesian War must have interrupted the completion from 431 BC and carving of the column flutes was not done and the stylobate blocks were left unfinished, retaining the protective excess marble on their easily damaged corners and upper surfaces. Later the temple was severely damaged at its eastern end and the upper courses repaired with new blocks, thought to be caused by the armies of Philip V of Macedon during his raids in 200 BC.

Rhamnus was the birthplace of the orator Antiphon.

=== Roman Period ===
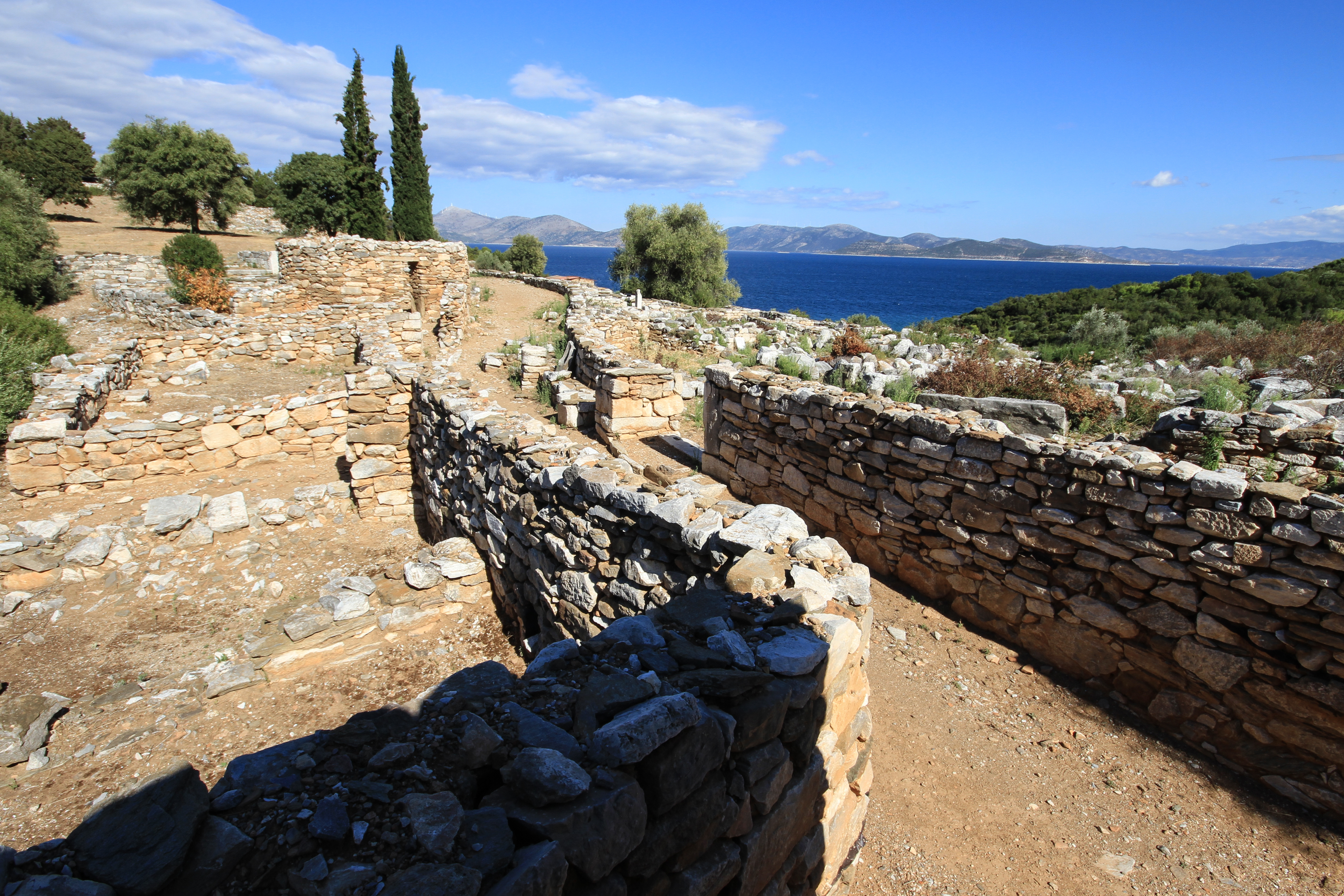
Main street

The city was still in existence in the time of Pliny the Elder.

In c. 46 AD, dedications were made at the sanctuary to the deified Livia, the wife of Augustus, and to the emperor Claudius. In the 2nd century AD, Herodes Atticus made dedications of busts of the emperors Marcus Aurelius and Lucius Verus as well as a statue of his pupil Polydeucion.

The temples survived until the 4th century AD. The cult of Nemesis at Rhamnous came to a formal end with the decree of the Eastern Roman emperor Arcadius in 382 AD that ordered the destruction of any surviving polytheist temples in the countryside, but the remains of the sanctuary and the fortress were never entirely buried and have remained visible ever since.

== The City ==
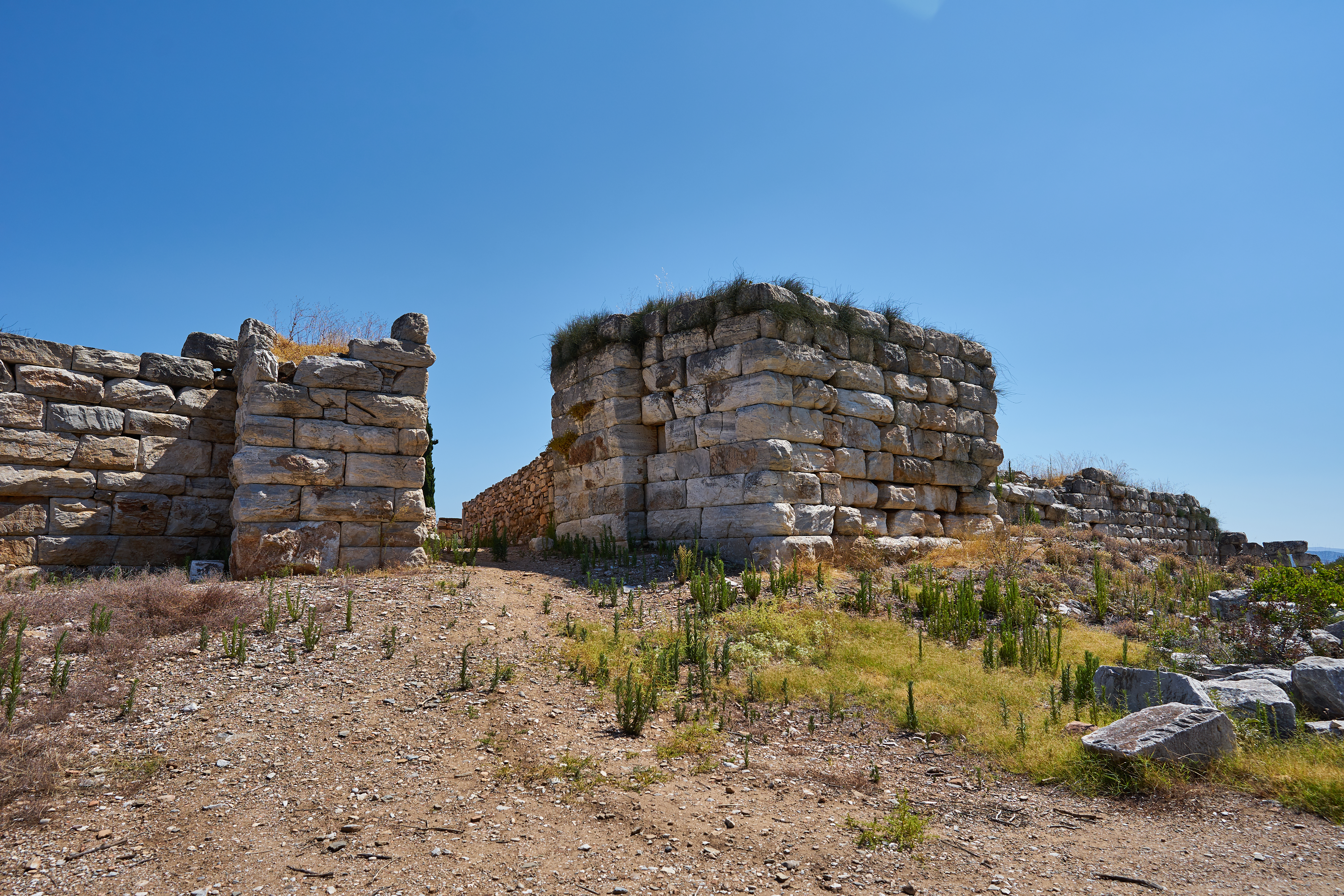
Southern gate

The fortified acropolis of Rhamnous occupies a c. 28m high hill of area approximately 230 by 270m. The city walls were constructed of the local marble from Agia Marina. The well-preserved principal gate is situated upon the narrow ridge and adjoins the southern wall, about 20 feet (6.1 m) in height. The extension of the fortification further down the hill embraced the little theatre, the gymnasium, a small sanctuary of Dionysos, a number of other public buildings and dwellings.

There were also significant numbers of buildings outside the walls.

Many grave monuments have been recovered from burials along the road between Rhamnous and Marathon.

=== The sanctuary of Nemesis ===
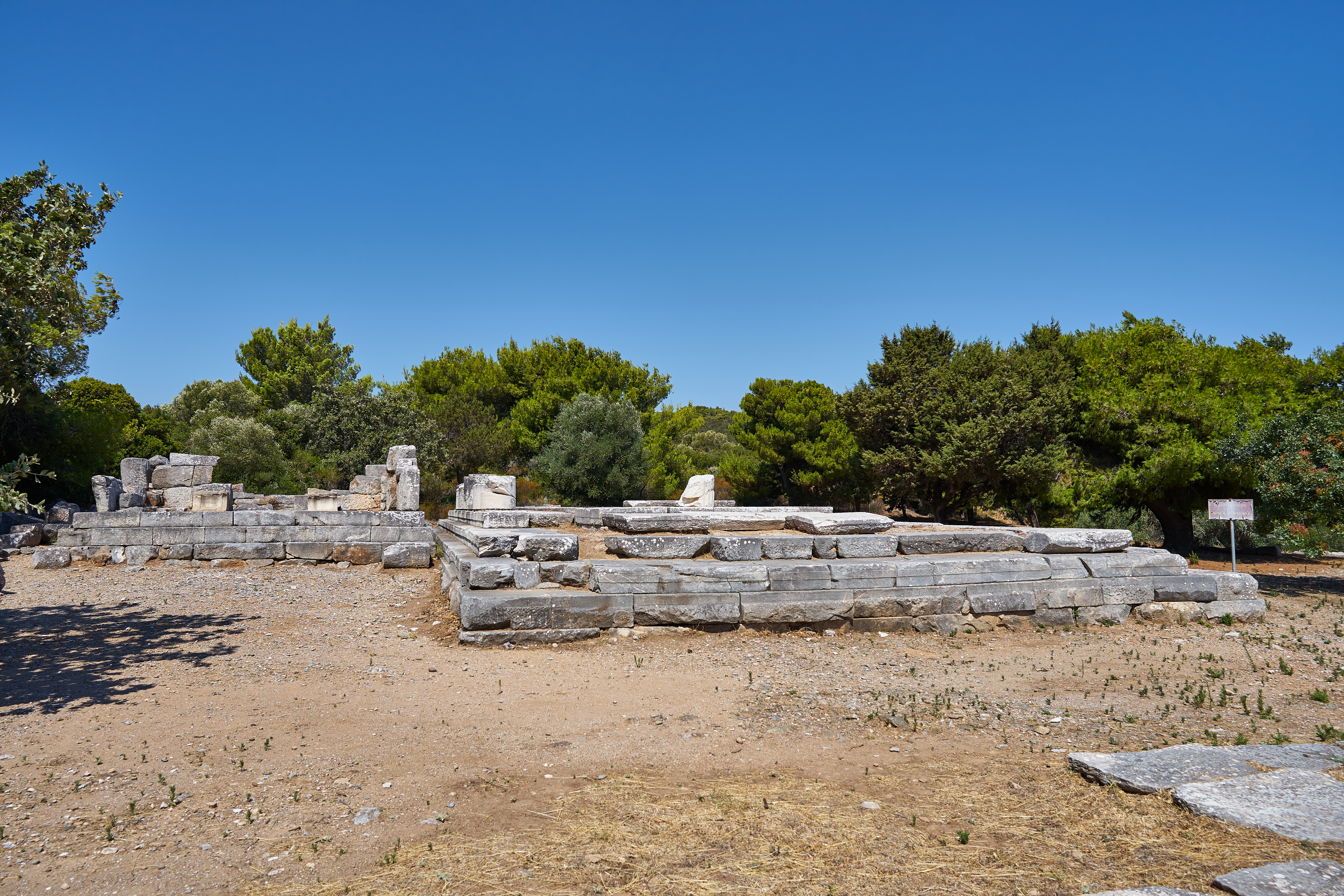
Sanctuary of Nemesis; view of the two temples

600m south of the town, on the road leading to the principal gate was a large artificial platform, supported by a wall of pure white marble, formed the temenos (τέμενος) or sacred enclosure on which the remains of two temples, which are almost contiguous, and nearly parallel to each other, can be seen.

==== Small Temple ====
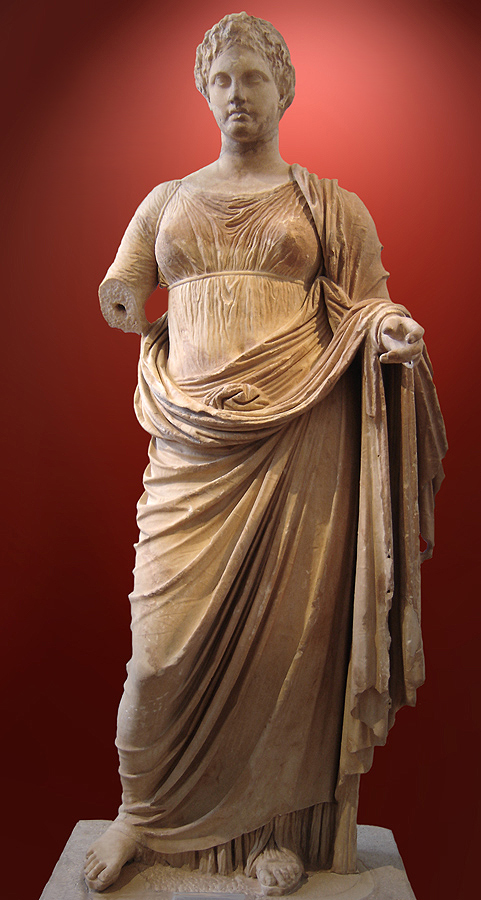
Themis of Rhamnous, National Archaeological Museum, Athens

The small temple was made of poros stone and consisted only of a cella, with a portico containing two Doric columns in antis. It measured 6.15 by 9.9m with a 6 × 12 Doric order and was dedicated to both the goddesses Themis and Nemesis as indicated by dedicatory inscriptions on two marble seats on the porch of the 4th century BC. The former goddess was the personification of Right Order and the latter the avenger of Order's transgressors.

There are several cuttings on the steps of this temple for the insertion of stelai. The walls of the cella and the terrace of the sanctuary platform are built in the Lesbian polygonal style of masonry. This temple probably served later as a treasury of the large temple for its cult statues.

Among the ruins of the temple was found a part, missing the head and shoulders, of a statue of human size (now in the British Museum) in the archaic style of the Aeginetan school. From this statue, as well as from the architecture of the smaller temple, it appears to have been the more ancient of the two. Hence it has been inferred that the smaller temple was anterior to the Greco-Persian War, and was destroyed by the Persians just before the Battle of Marathon.

A statue of Themis and several other dedications, unearthed in the cella, are at the National Archaeological Museum, Athens.

==== Large Temple ====
The temple was a peripteral hexastyle, 71 feet (22 m) long and 33 feet (10 m) broad, with 12 columns on the side, and with a pronaus, cella, and posticum in the usual manner.

It contained a famous colossal statue of Nemesis, 10 cubits in height, with several figures in relief on its base. According to Pausanias, this statue was made by Pheidias, from a block of Parian marble which the Persians had brought with them for the construction of a trophy. Other writers say that the statue was the work of Agoracritus of Paros, a disciple of Pheidias. It was however a common opinion that Pheidias was the real author of the statue, but that he gave up the honour of the work to his favourite disciple.

Among the ruins were fragments of a colossal statue, corresponding in size with that of the Rhamnusian Nemesis; but these fragments were made of Attic marble, and not of Parian stone as stated by Pausanias. It is, however, not improbable, as William Martin Leake, who visited the site in the early 19th century, has remarked, that the story of the block of stone brought by the Persians was a fable, or an invention of the priests of Nemesis by which Pausanias was deceived.

The blocks used to repair the Temple of Nemesis are distinct from the original blocks and the tooling is quite different which suggests that the repairs were made in the Roman period, when interest in the old Classical temples was renewed. The central block of the architrave on the east end of the temple bears an inscription of rededication to the goddess Livia by the Demos, which may be associated with the repairs. This reconstruction must have been costly since it involved replacing the east end, which required making duplicate blocks for the frieze, geison, perhaps the tympanon, the raking geison, the acroteria, and perhaps part of the sima, rooftiles, and ceiling coffers.

Unlike other temples in Attica which had fallen into disrepair, the Temple of Nemesis was not stripped of useful parts or removed whole to Athens. Instead, it was restored with pride as an important local monument.

==== Statue of Nemesis ====
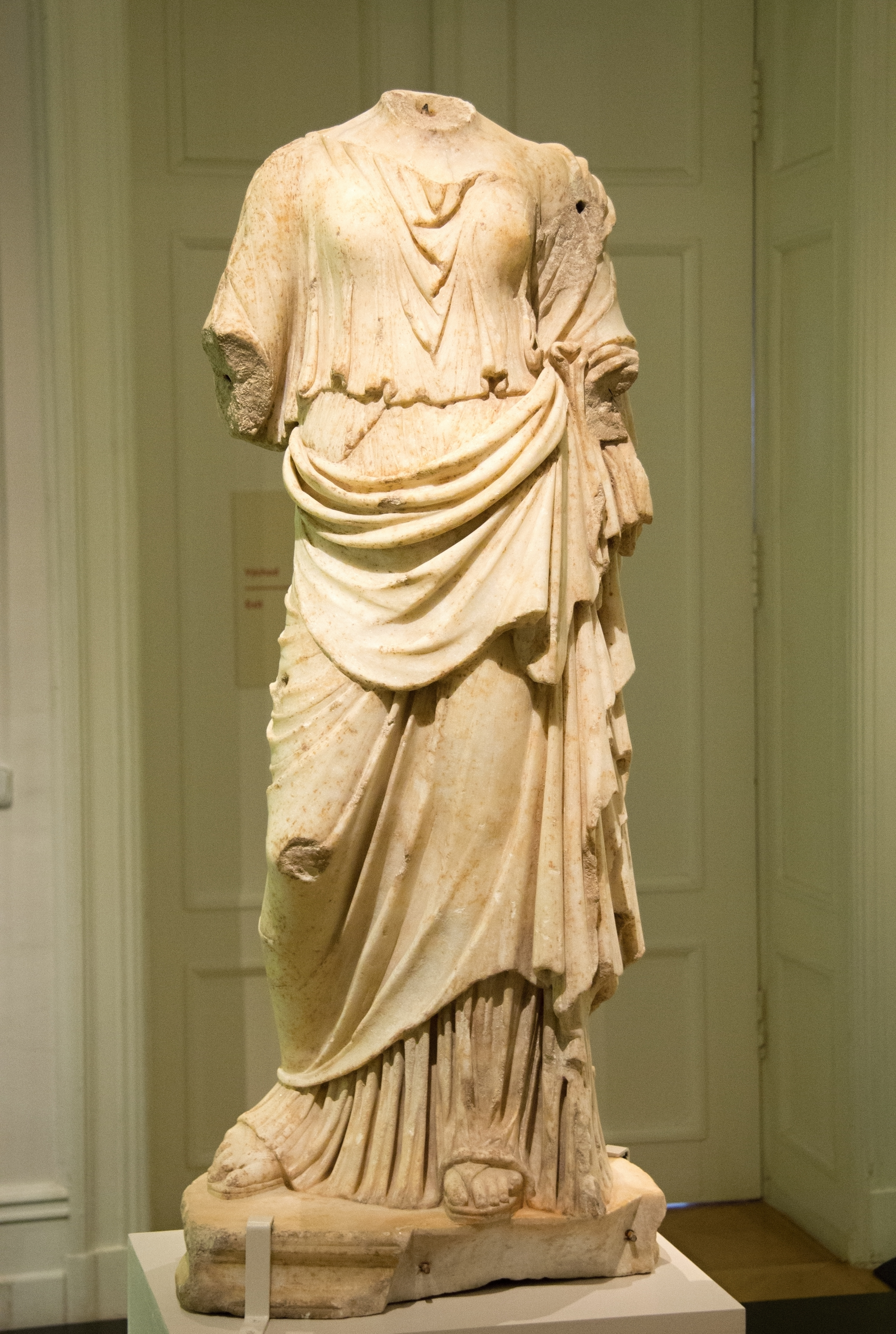
Nemesis statue, Roman copy, Kinský Palace (Prague).

The cella of the large temple housed the cult figure of Nemesis, sculpted by Agorakritos, a pupil of Phidias, from the block of Parian marble alleged to have been brought by the overconfident Persians for their triumphal stele. This famous statue of the goddess stood within the cella of the temple and was around 4m high. The Roman historian and connoisseur Varro rated it the finest example of Greek sculpture.

The badly damaged remains of an over life-size marble head from a cult statue of Nemesis, with perforations for attaching a gold crown, was discovered by the British architect John Gandy in the early nineteenth century and is now part of the British Museum's collection. This has a stylistic similarity to the pediment sculptures of the Parthenon of 440–432 BC.

Many parts of the original statue have been recovered and reconstructed from the hundreds of fragments found scattered about after the destruction of the cult image by early Christians, and this allowed the identification of a total of eleven Roman copies on a smaller scale. The base of the statue, approximately 90 cm high and 240 cm wide, has also been reconstructed; on three sides of the base, the nearly-in-the-round scene shows the presentation of Helen to her mother Leda by Nemesis.

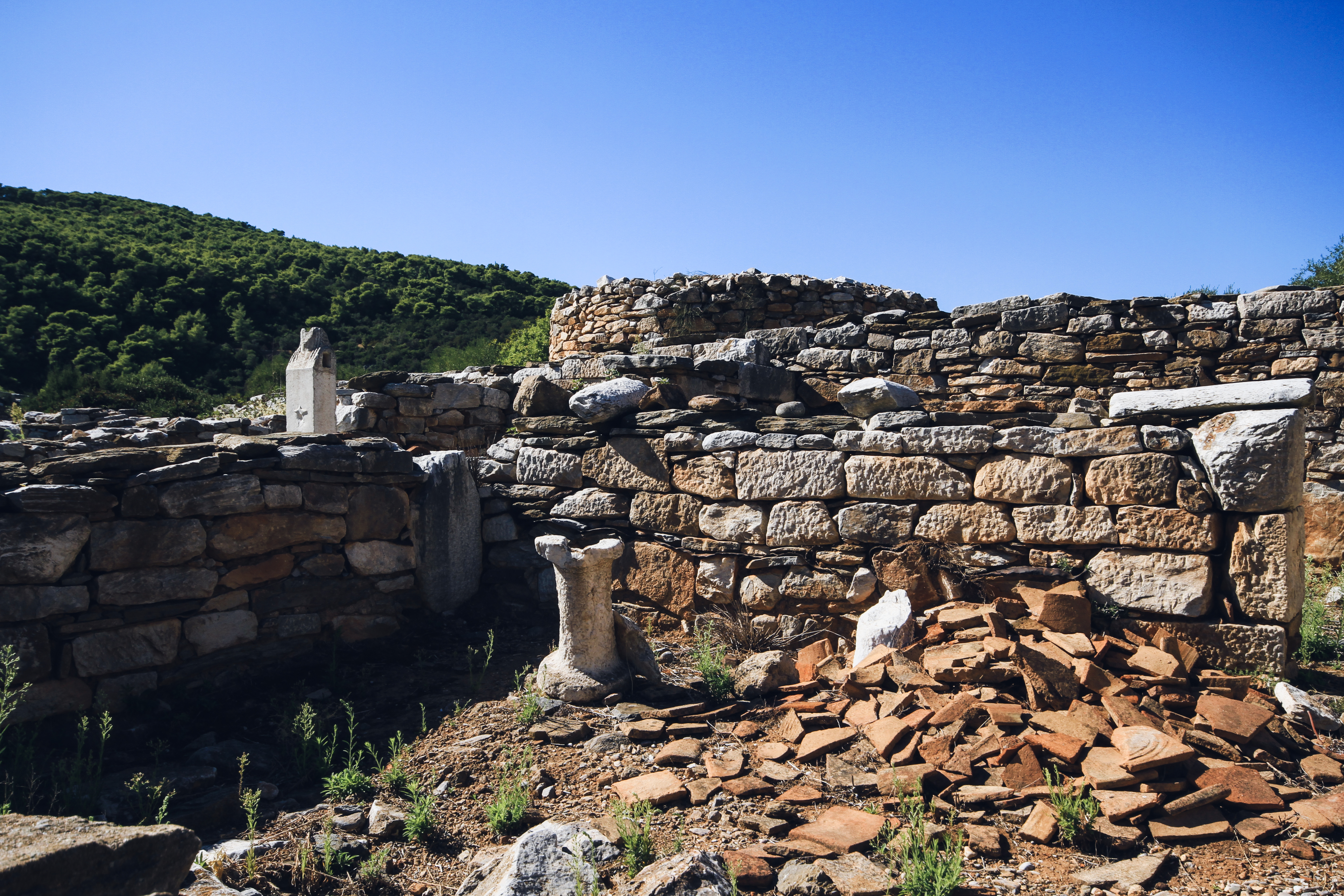
Buildings

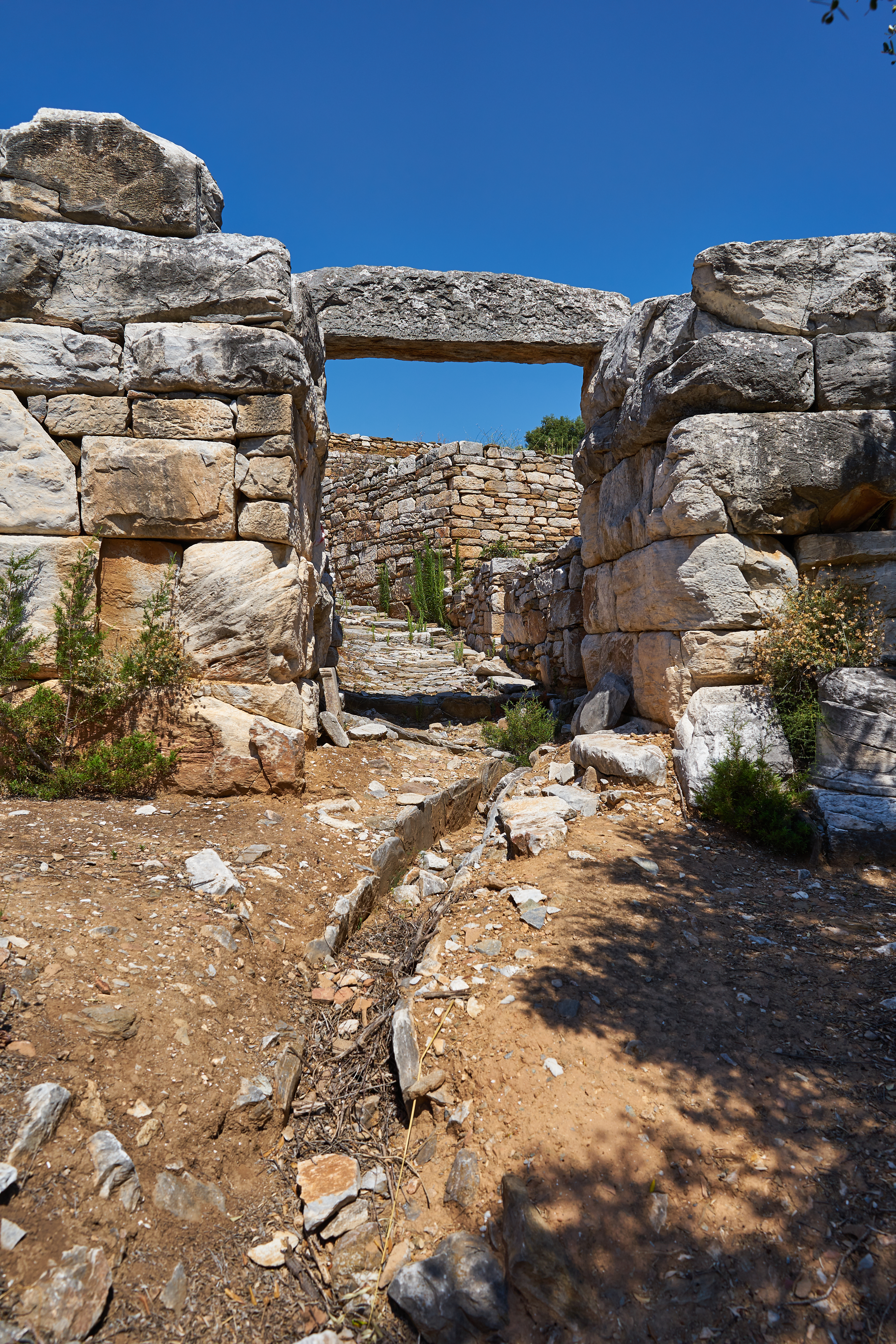
Gate

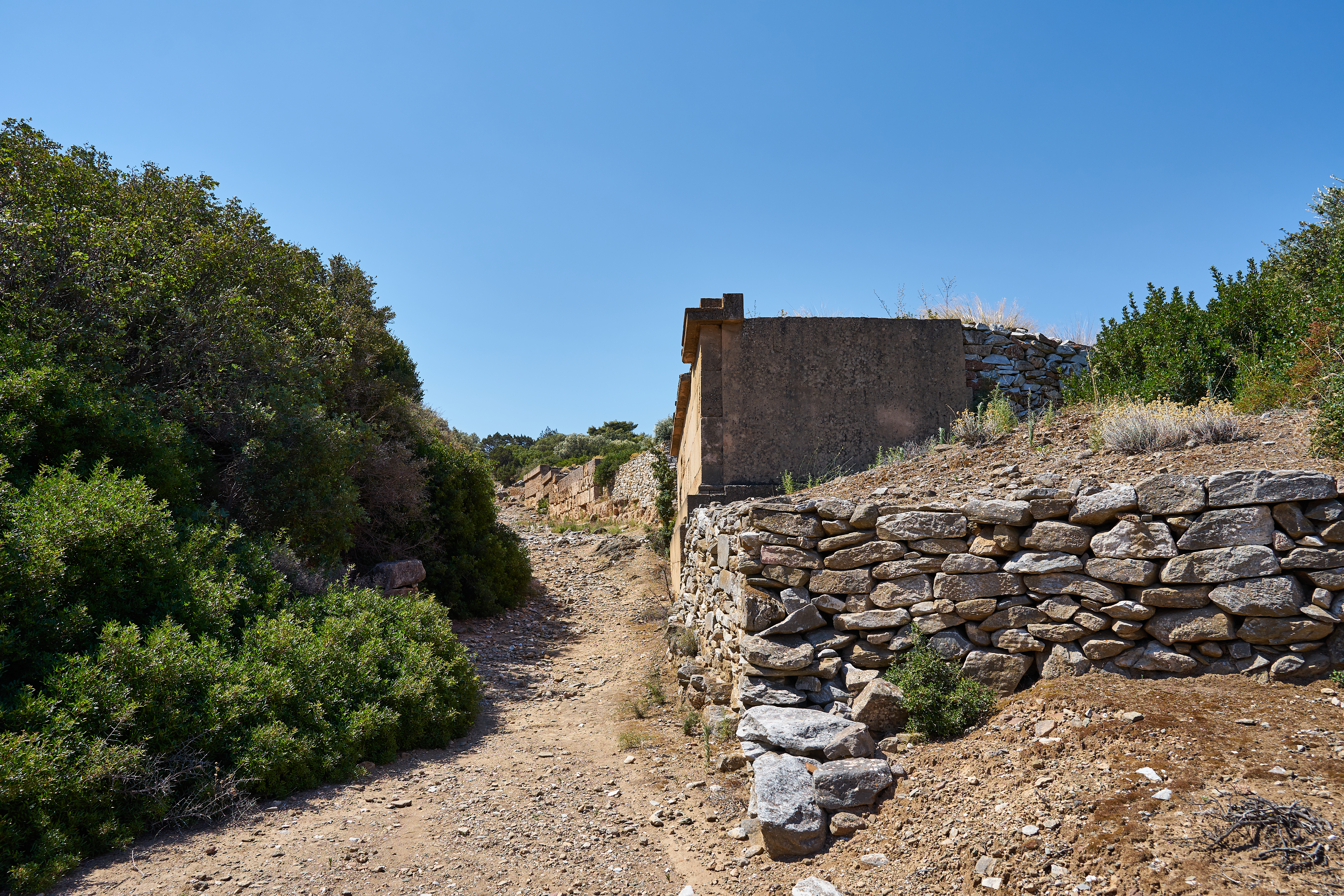
Grave monuments

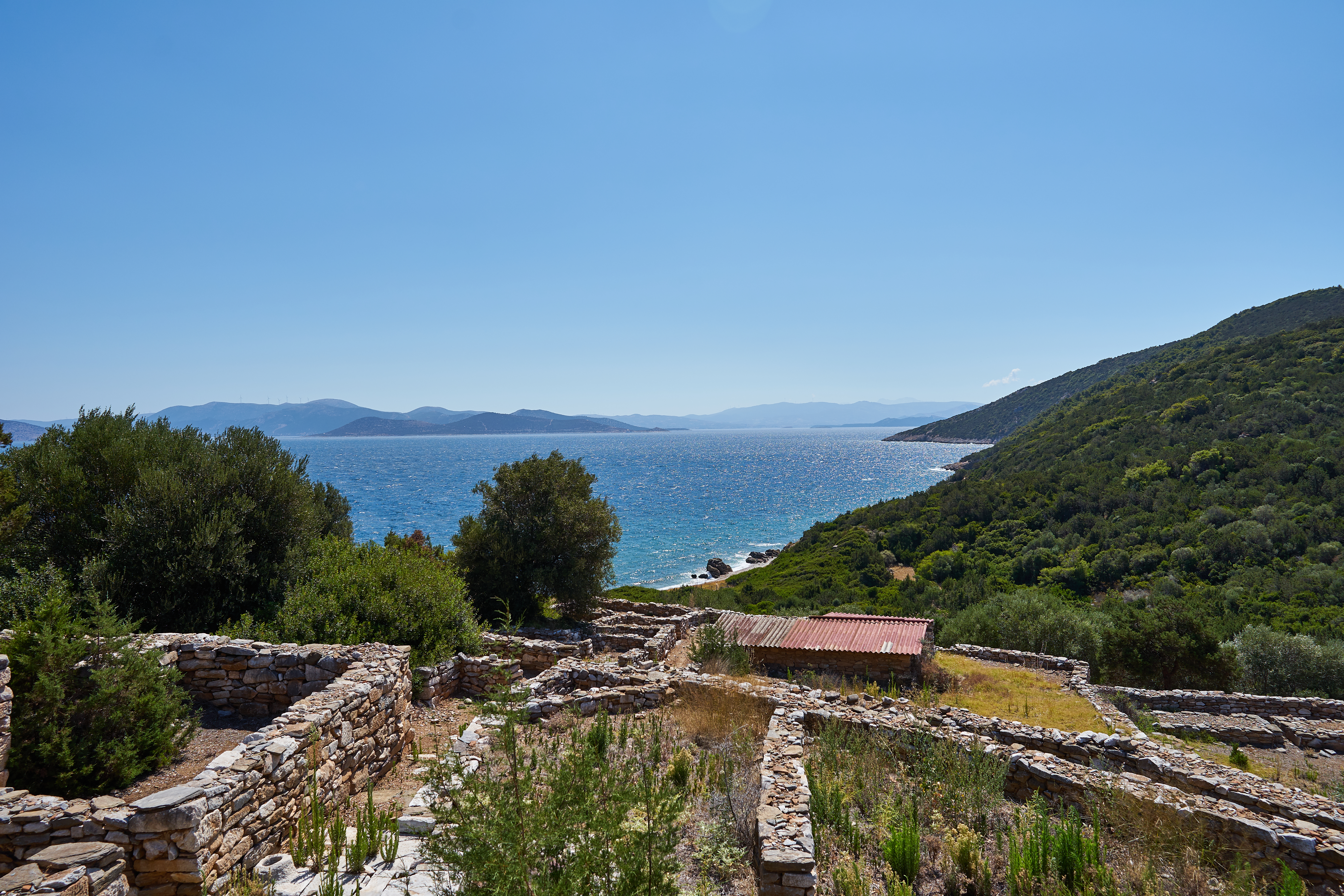
View of the Euboic Gulf

== See also ==
- List of ancient Greek cities
- Rhamnus (plant)
