= Nemesis =

Goddess of retribution in Greek mythology

- Goddess of retribution
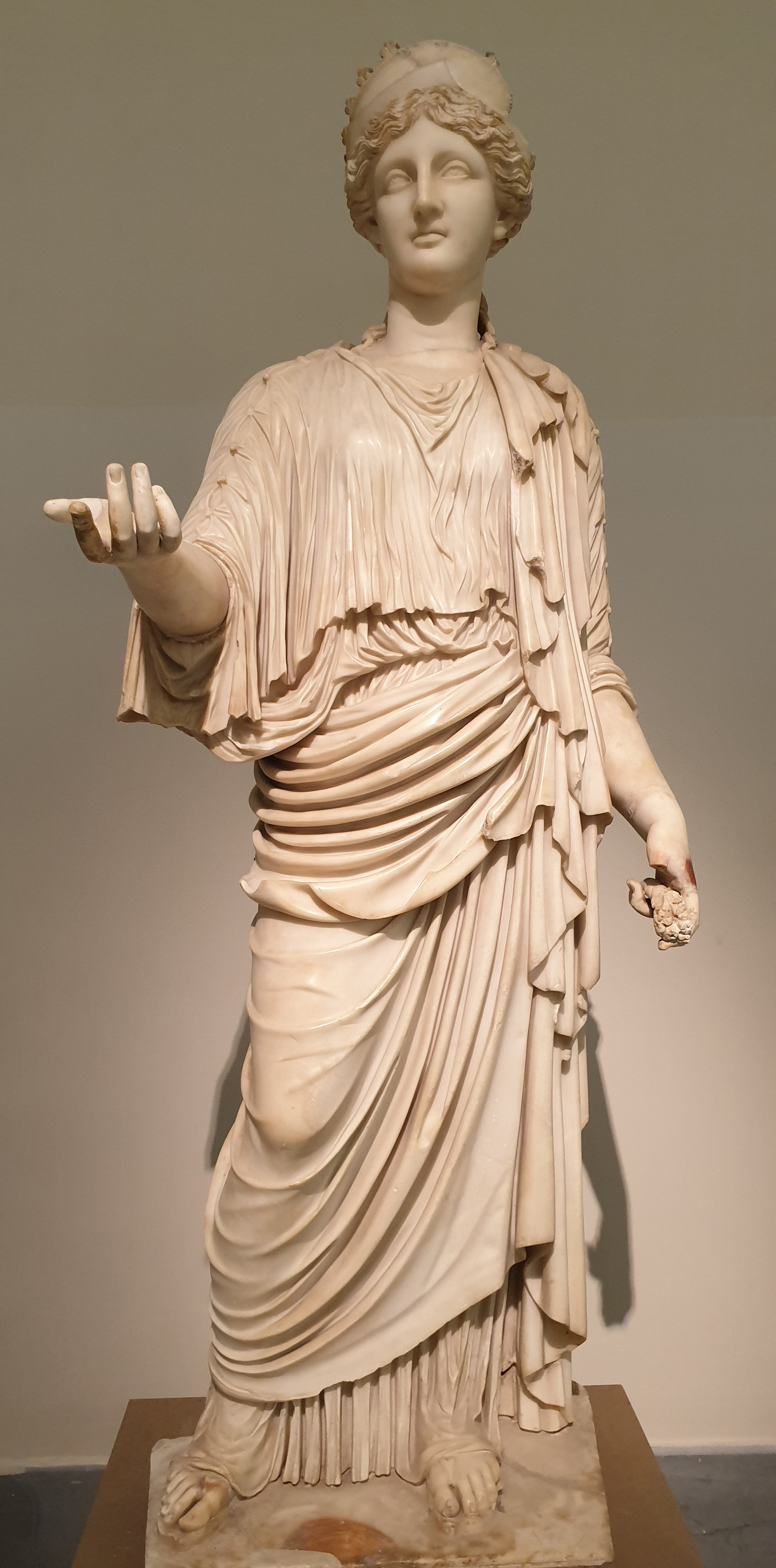
- Farnese Nemesis, National Archaeological Museum of Naples
- Other names: Rhamnousia, Rhamnusia
- Animals: goose
- Symbol: Sword, lash, dagger, measuring rod, scales, bridle
- Festivals: Nemeseia
- Parents: Nyx and Erebus
- Offspring: Helen of Troy

In ancient Greek religion and mythology, Nemesis (/ˈnɛməsɪs/; Ancient Greek: Νέμεσις, romanized: Némesis, lit. 'Distribution'), also called Rhamnousia (or Rhamnusia; Ancient Greek: Ῥαμνουσία, romanized: Rhamnousía, lit. 'the goddess of Rhamnous'), was the goddess who personified retribution for the sin of hubris: arrogance before the gods.

== Etymology ==
The name Nemesis is derived from the Greek word νέμειν, némein, meaning "to give what is due", from Proto-Indo-European *nem- "distribute".

== Family ==
According to Hesiod's Theogony, Nemesis was one of the children of Nyx alone and also had a wide range of siblings, including Moros (Doom), black Ker (violent death), Eris (Strife), Hypnos (Sleep), Apate (Deceit), Thanatos (Death), the Oneiroi (Dreams), Momos (Blame), the Moirai (Fates), and Oizys (Misery). Pausanias described her as the daughter of Oceanus. In De astronomia she was a child of Erebus and Nyx. Some made her the daughter of Zeus by an unnamed mother. In several traditions, Nemesis was seen as the mother of Helen of Troy by Zeus, adopted and raised by Leda and Tyndareus. According to the Byzantine scholar Tzetzes, Bacchylides had Nemesis as the mother of the Telchines by Tartarus. By Zeus, Nemesis mothered the divine twins Castor and Pollux.

== Mythology ==
=== Fortune and retribution ===
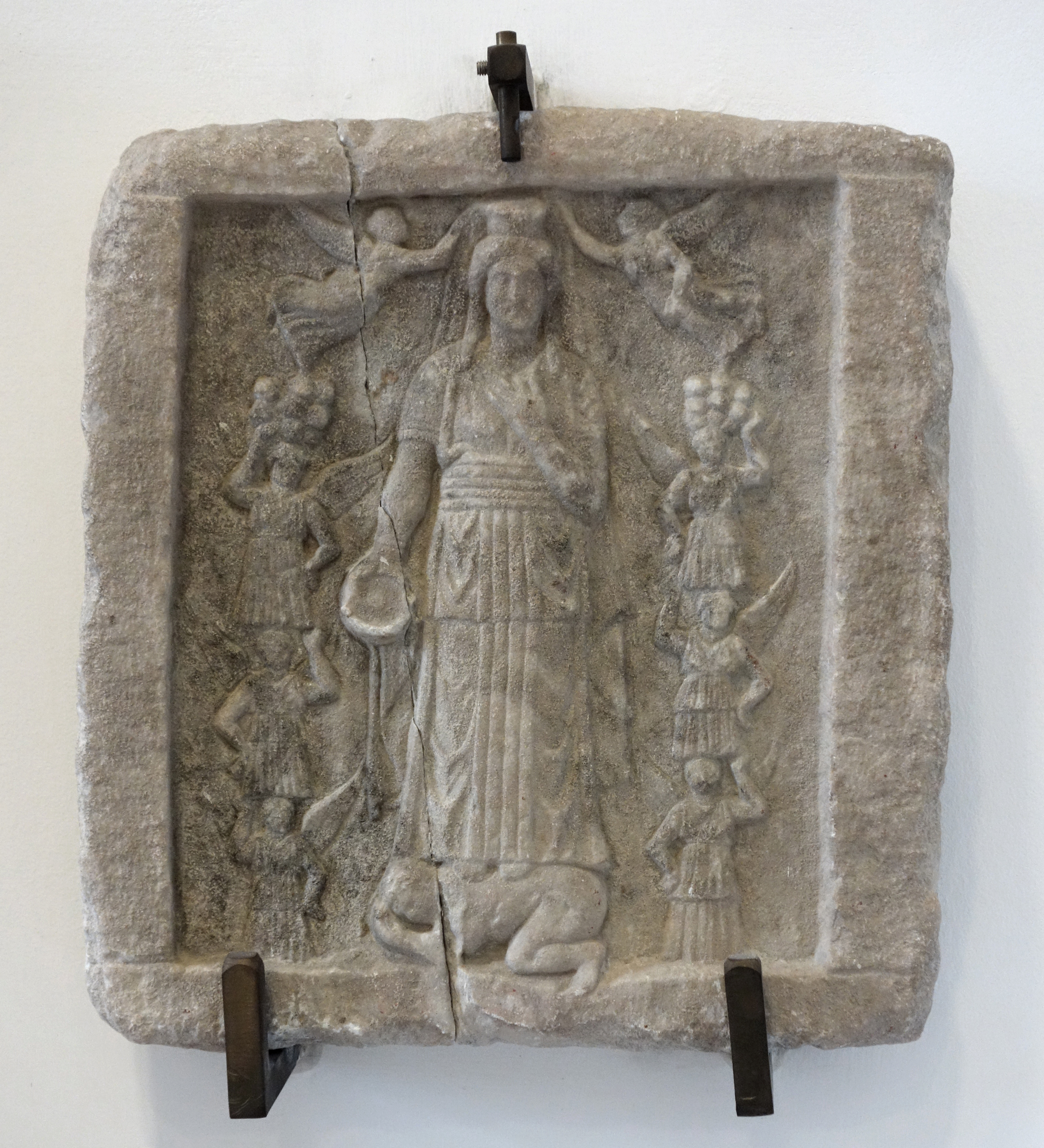
Relief of Nemesis trampling an enemy and flanked by small figures of Nike, 3rd century CE (Brindisi, Museo archeologico Francesco Ribezzo)

The word nemesis originally meant the distributor of fortune, neither good nor bad, simply in due proportion to each according to what was deserved. Later, Nemesis, in Herodotus and Pindar it came to suggest the resentment caused by any disturbance of this right proportion, the sense of justice that could not allow it to pass unpunished.

O. Gruppe (1906) and others connect the name with "to feel just resentment". From the fourth century onward, Nemesis, as the just balancer of Fortune's chance, could be associated with Tyche.

Divine retribution is a major theme in the Greek world view, providing the unifying theme of the tragedies of Sophocles and many other literary works. Hesiod states: "Also deadly Nyx bore Nemesis an affliction to mortals subject to death" (Theogony, 223, though perhaps an interpolated line). Nemesis appears in a still more concrete form in a fragment of the epic Cypria.

She is implacable justice: that of Zeus in the Olympian scheme of things, although it is clear she existed prior to him, as her images look similar to several other goddesses, such as Cybele, Rhea, Demeter, and Artemis.

In the Greek tragedies Nemesis appears chiefly as the avenger of crime and the punisher of hubris, and as such is akin to Atë and the Erinyes. She was sometimes called Adrasteia, probably meaning "one from whom there is no escape"; her epithet Erinys ("implacable") is specially applied to Demeter and the Phrygian mother goddess, Cybele.

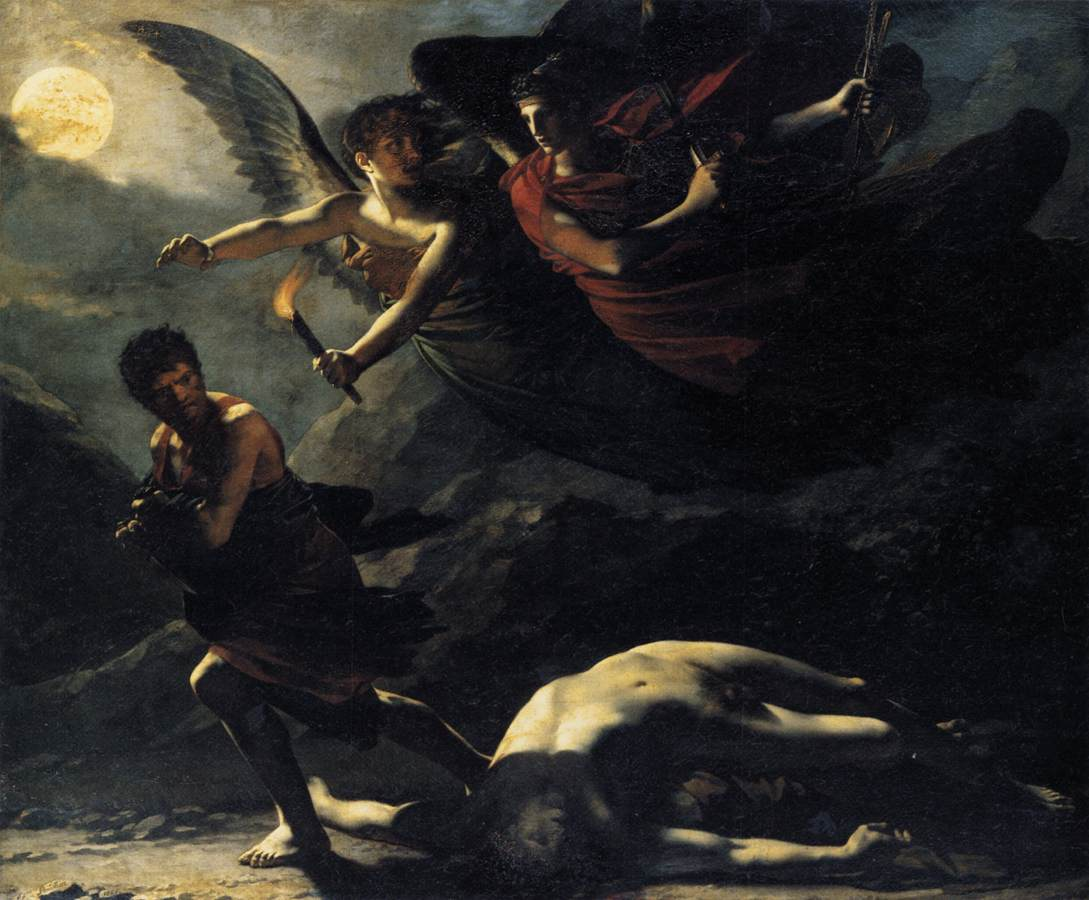
Justice (Dike, on the left) and Divine Vengeance (Nemesis, right) pursuing a murderer, in a painting by Pierre-Paul Prud'hon, 1808

=== Nemesis and Zeus ===
In some less common traditions, it is Nemesis, rather than the mortal Spartan queen Leda, who is the mother of Helen of Troy. This narrative is first found in the lost epic Cypria, the prelude of the Iliad. According to its author, Stasinus of Cyprus, Helen was born from the rape of Nemesis by Zeus. Zeus fell in love with Nemesis, here possibly presented as his own daughter, (Note: In his translation of the passage, Hugh G. Evelyn-White wrote that Nemesis tried to escape from "her father Zeus", taking the ancient text to imply more than a casual usage of "father Zeus", which would provide an explanation for the shame and anger Nemesis feels. At the same time it has been argued that the impending rape is enough for Nemesis to react in such a manner, and it is rather far-fetched to suggest that incest (and the taboo against it) is the leading theme of the narrative.) and pursued her, only for her to flee in shame. She took several forms to escape Zeus, but he eventually captured her and raped her.

Apollodorus speaks of a single transformation, into a goose, while Zeus turned into a swan to hunt her down and raped her, producing an egg that was given to the queen of Sparta; Helen hatched from the egg, and was raised by Leda. In another variation, Zeus desired Nemesis, but could not persuade her to have sex with him. So he tasked Aphrodite to transform into an eagle and mock-chase him, while he transformed into a swan. Nemesis, pitying the poor swan, offered it refuge in her arms, and fell into a deep sleep. While asleep, Zeus raped her and in time she bore an egg which was transported to Leda by Hermes. Leda then raised Helen as her own. According to Eratosthenes in his Catasterismi, this version was presented by Cratinus.

=== Narcissus ===
In Ovid's Metamorphoses, Nemesis enacted divine retribution on Narcissus for his vanity. After he rejected the advances of the nymph Echo, Nemesis lured him to a pool where he caught sight of his own reflection and fell in love with it, eventually dying. His body was transformed by the nymphs into a narcissus flower.

=== Aura ===
In Nonnus' epic Dionysiaca, Aura, one of Artemis' virgin attendants, questioned her mistress' virginity due to the feminine and curvaceous shape of her body; Aura claimed that no goddess or woman with that sort of figure would be a virgin, and asserted her own superiority over the goddess thanks to her own lean and boyish silhouette. Artemis, enraged, went to Nemesis and asked for revenge. Nemesis promised to the goddess that Aura would have her punishment, and that the punishment would be to lose the virginity she took such pride in. Nemesis then contacted Eros, the god of love, and he struck Dionysus with one of his arrows. Dionysus fell madly in love with Aura, and when she rebuffed his advances, he got her drunk, tied her up and raped her as she lay unconscious, bringing Nemesis' plan to a success.

== Interpretation ==
=== Role in Greek religion ===
Stafford describes Nemesis as a regulator of justice and moral balance rather than simply a punisher of hubris. She analyzes Nemesis’s cult at Rhamnous and her earliest appearances in Hesiod, emphasizing her function in maintaining rightful measure and restoring equilibrium when moral boundaries are violated. Stafford also discusses Hellenistic and Roman iconography that depicts Nemesis as a guardian of order and divine justice.

=== Retributive justice and moral balance ===
Kosachova characterizes Nemesis as the Greek personification of retributive justice who restores balance when moral or cosmic order is disturbed. This includes punishing arrogance, cruelty, or excessive good fortune, reflecting a broader cultural role that extends beyond simple vengeance.

== Iconography ==
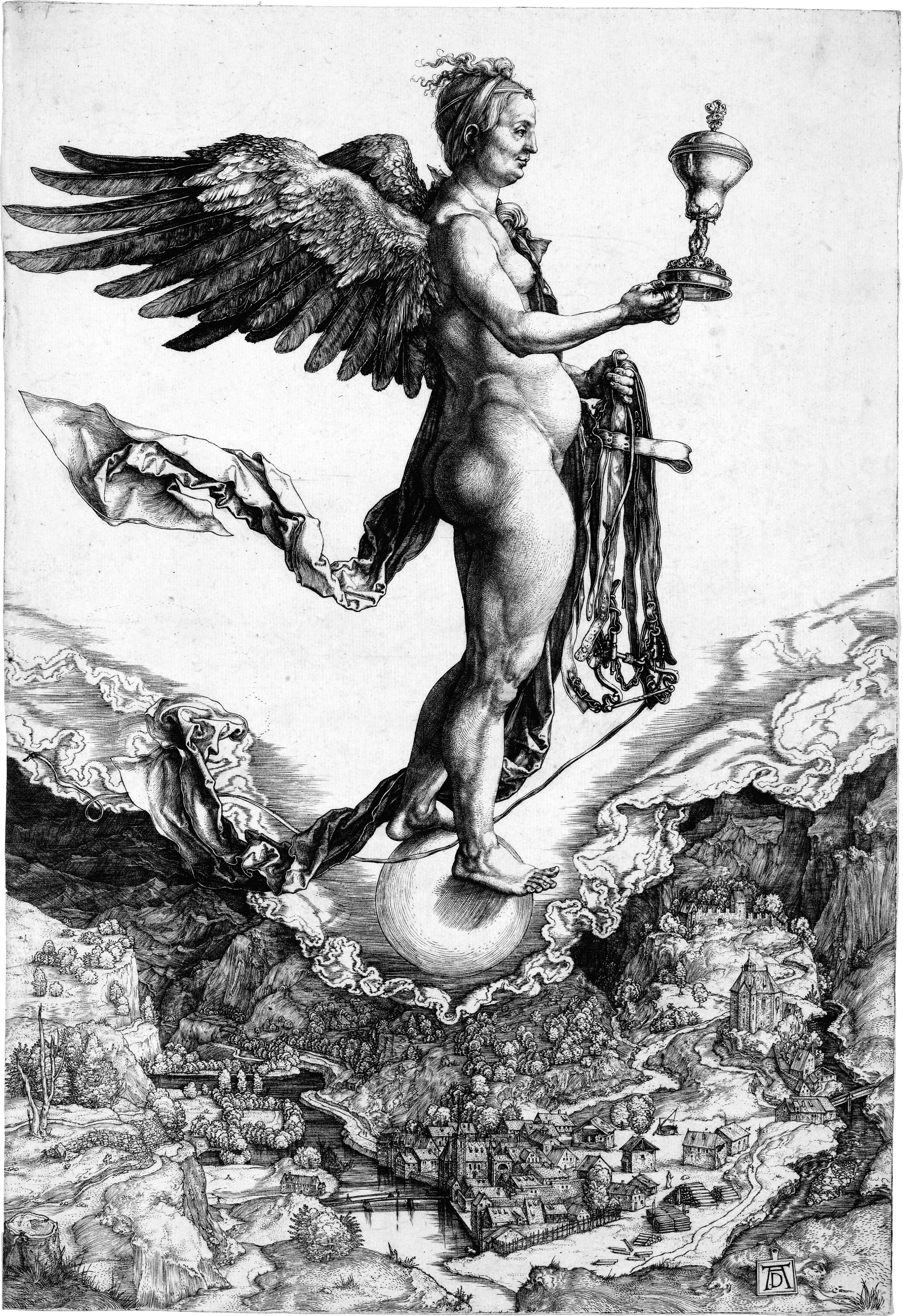
Engraving of Nemesis by Albrecht Dürer, c. 1502

She is portrayed as a winged goddess wielding a whip or a dagger. In early times the representations of Nemesis resembled Aphrodite, who sometimes bears the epithet Nemesis.

As the goddess of proportion and the avenger of crime, she is often depicted wielding a measuring rod (tally stick), a bridle, scales, a sword, and a scourge, and she rides in a chariot drawn by griffins.

The poet Mesomedes wrote a hymn to Nemesis in the early second century AD, where he addressed her:

Nemesis, winged balancer of life, dark-faced goddess, daughter of Justice

and mentioned her "adamantine bridles" that restrain "the frivolous insolences of mortals".

== Local cult ==
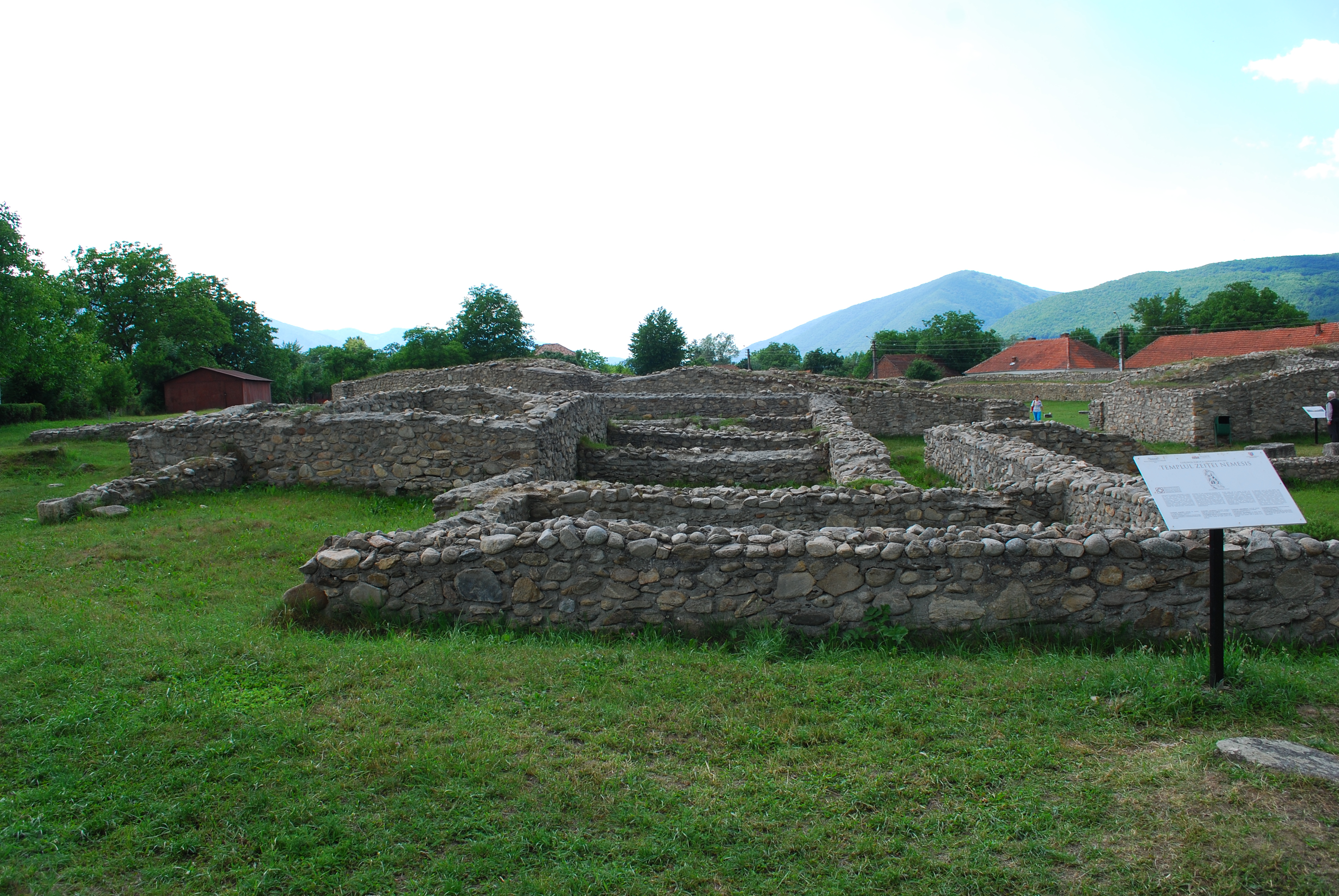
Temple of Nemesis in Ulpia Traiana Sarmizegetusa

=== Rhamnous ===
As the "Goddess of Rhamnous", Nemesis was honored and placated in an archaic sanctuary in the district of Rhamnous, in northeastern Attica. There she was a daughter of Oceanus, the primeval river-ocean that encircles the world. Pausanias noted her iconic statue there. It included a crown of stags and little Nikes and was made by Pheidias after the Battle of Marathon (490 BC), crafted from a block of Parian marble brought by the overconfident Persians, who had intended to make a memorial stele after their expected victory.

=== Smyrna ===
At Smyrna, there were two manifestations of Nemesis, more akin to Aphrodite than to Artemis. The reason for this duality is hard to explain. It is suggested that they represent two aspects of the goddess, the kindly and the implacable, or the goddesses of the old city and the new city refounded by Alexander. The martyrology Acts of Pionius, set in the "Decian persecution" of AD 250–51, mentions a lapsed Smyrnan Christian who was attending to the sacrifices at the altar of the temple of these Nemeses.

=== Rome ===
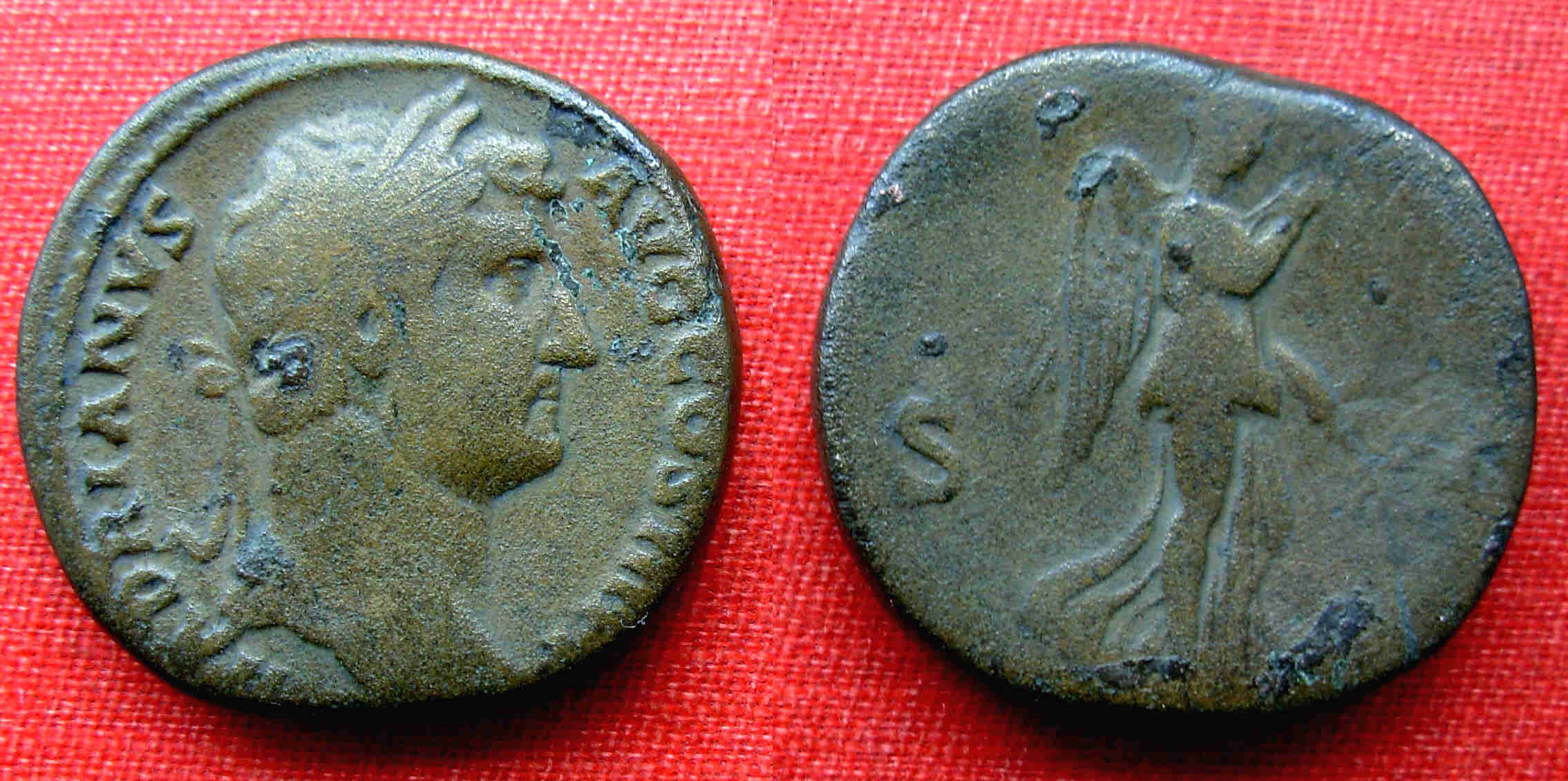
Nemesis on a brass sestertius of Hadrian, struck at Rome AD 136

Nemesis was one of several tutelary deities of the drill-ground (as Nemesis campestris). Modern scholarship offers little support for the once-prevalent notion that arena personnel such as gladiators, venatores and bestiarii were personally or professionally dedicated to her cult. Rather, she seems to have represented a kind of "Imperial Fortuna" who dispensed Imperial retribution on the one hand, and Imperially subsidized gifts on the other; both were functions of the popular gladiatorial Ludi held in Roman arenas. She is shown on a few examples of Imperial coinage as Nemesis-Pax, mainly under Claudius and Hadrian. In the third century AD, there is evidence of the belief in an all-powerful Nemesis-Fortuna. She was worshipped by a society called Hadrian's freedmen.

Ammianus Marcellinus includes her in a digression on Justice following his description of the death of Gallus Caesar.

== See also ==
- Kali
- Sekhmet
- Ultio

== Bibliography ==
- Campbell, David A. (1992). Greek Lyric, Volume IV: Bacchylides, Corinna via Harvard University Press. Loeb Classical Library No. 461. Cambridge, Massachusetts: Harvard University Press. ISBN 978-0-674-99508-6.
- Gantz, Timothy (1996). Early Greek Myth: A Guide to Literary and Artistic Sources. Johns Hopkins University Press. Two volumes: ISBN 978-0-8018-5360-9 (Vol. 1), ISBN 978-0-8018-5362-3 (Vol. 2).
- Hesiod. The Homeric Hymns, and Homerica (via the Internet Archive), with an English Translation by Hugh G. Evelyn-White. Cambridge, MA: Harvard University Press; London: William Heinemann Ltd. 1914. Online version at the Perseus Digital Library.
- Lamari, Anna A.; Montanari, Franco; Novokhatko, Anna (2020). Fragmentation in Ancient Greek Drama. De Gruyter. ISBN 978-3-11-0621020.
- Matranga, Pietro (1850). Anecdota Graeca, Volume II via Google Books. Rome: Typis C. A. Bertinelli.
- Pausanias (1918). Pausanias Description of Greece with an English Translation by W.H.S. Jones, Litt.D., and H.A. Ormerod, M.A., in 4 Volumes via the Perseus Digital Library. Cambridge, Massachusetts: Harvard University Press; London: William Heinemann.
